= John Nairne (1691–1770) =

Scottish Jacobite soldier (1691–1770)

John Nairne (c. 1691 – 11 July 1770), styled Earl of Nairne and 3rd Lord Nairne from 1726, was a Scottish Jacobite soldier.

== Biography ==
Nairne was the eldest son of William Murray, 2nd Lord Nairne and Margaret Nairne, 2nd Lady Nairne, and a grandson of John Murray, 1st Marquess of Atholl. His parents were both ardent Jacobites and Nairne joined them in supporting the Jacobite rising of 1715. He became a lieutenant colonel in Lord Charles Murray's regiment. He was taken prisoner alongside his father following the Battle of Preston, but was granted his freedom by the Indemnity Act 1717 having been forfeited of his inheritance. Nairne's right to inherit "any real or personal estate that might descend to him", but not his father's title, was established by an Act of Parliament in 1738. Nairn was nonetheless recognised as de jure Lord Nairne in Jacobite circles after his father's death in 1726.

Nairne was quick to join the Jacobite rising of 1745, taking command of the Atholl Brigade of infantry in the Jacobite Army. In late August 1745, he left Blair Castle with Donald Cameron of Lochiel and four hundred men to take possession of Dunkeld ready for Charles Edward Stuart's arrival there on 3 September. He was then sent forward to take possession of Perth for the Jacobites on 4 September. At the Battle of Prestonpans, Nairne held command of the second line, consisting of Athollmen, the Robertsons, the Macdonalds of Glencoe, and the Maclachlans. He was among those chosen to form Charles Edward Stuart's privy council and accompanied the Jacobite march into England in November 1745. Nairne was present at the Battle of Falkirk Muir in January 1746 and the Battle of Culloden in April 1746. He joined the Jacobite regroup under Lord George Murray at Ruthven Barracks following defeat at Culloden, but soon after he escaped to Sweden and then France. He was named as a subject of the Attainder of Earl of Kellie and Others Act 1745 as "John Nairn taking upon himself the Title or Style of Lord Nairn". He died in exile in France on 11 July 1770.

Nairne married Lady Catherine Murray, daughter of Charles Murray, 1st Earl of Dunmore, in c. 1712, by whom he had eight sons and four daughters. Five of the children died young.

Peerage of Scotland
| Preceded by William Murray | — TITULAR — Earl of Nairne; Jacobite peerage 1726–1770 | Succeeded by John Nairne |
