= Charles Murray, 1st Earl of Dunmore =

British peer

The Right Honourable The Earl of Dunmore PC
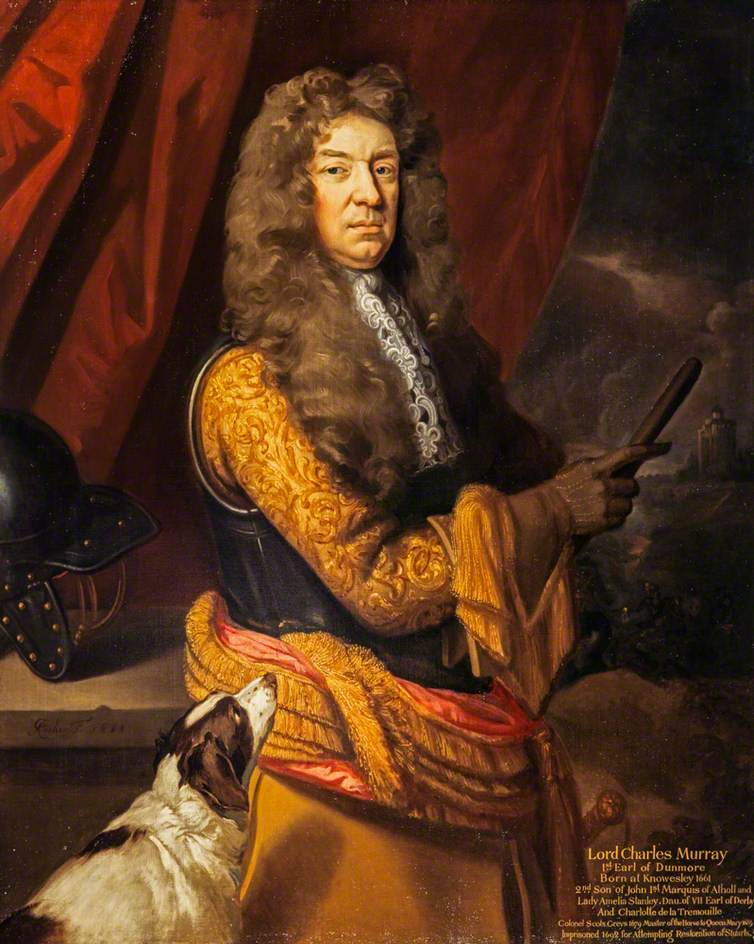
- Portrait of Lord Charles Murray, by Godfrey Kneller, 1683
- Born: 24 February 1661
- Died: 19 April 1710 (aged 49)
- Spouse: Catherine Watts (m. 1682; died 1710)
- Children: 8, including John, Robert, and Thomas
- Parent(s): John Murray, 1st Marquess of Atholl; Lady Amelia Stanley

Charles Murray, 1st Earl of Dunmore PC (24 February 1661 – 19 April 1710) was a British peer, previously Lord Charles Murray.

== Early life ==
Lord Charles Murray was born on 24 February 1661. He was the second son of Lady Amelia Anne Sophia Stanley and John Murray, 1st Marquess of Atholl, a leading Scottish royalist and defender of the Stuarts during the English Civil War of the 1640s, until after the rise to power of William and Mary. His elder brother John Murray, who inherited their father's marquessate in May 1703, was created 1st Duke of Atholl in June 1703. Among his younger brothers were Lord James Murray and William Murray, 2nd Lord Nairne.

His paternal grandparents were John Murray, 1st Earl of Atholl and Jean Campbell (a daughter of Sir Duncan Campbell, 1st Baronet). His maternal grandparents were James Stanley, 7th Earl of Derby and Charlotte de La Trémoille (a daughter of Claude de La Trémoille, duc de Thouars and Countess Charlotte Brabantina of Nassau).

== Career ==
By 1685, he was a Colonel in the Scots Greys before rising to become a general in the British Army.

He was created Earl of Dunmore and Lord Murray of Blair, Moulin and Tillimet, and Viscount of Fincastle, all on 16 August 1686 in the Peerage of Scotland. Lord Dunmore was imprisoned as a suspected Jacobite in 1689, again, in 1692, and lastly in 1696. Nevertheless, he served as Master of Horse to Princesses Mary and Anne. He was appointed Privy Counsellor in 1703.

== Personal life ==
On 8 December 1682, Murray married Catherine Watts, daughter and heiress of Richard Watts of Great Munden, Hertfordshire. Together they had five sons and three daughters:

- James Murray, Viscount Fincastle (1683–1704), a Captain in the Macartney's Regiment of Scots Foot who died unmarried.
- Henrietta Maria Murray (c. 1684–1702), who married Patrick Kinnaird, 3rd Lord Kinnaird, son of Patrick Kinnaird, 2nd Lord Kinnaird and Hon. Anne Fraser (a daughter of 8th Lord Lovat), in 1702.
- John Murray, 2nd Earl of Dunmore (1685–1752), a General and Representative peer for Scotland who died unmarried.
- Lady Anne Murray (1687–1710), who married John Cochrane, 4th Earl of Dundonald and Lady Susanna Hamilton (daughter of William Hamilton, Duke of Hamilton and Anne Hamilton, suo jure Duchess of Hamilton), in 1706.
- Hon. Robert Murray (1689–1738), a Brig.-Gen. who married Mary Halkett, daughter of Sir Charles Halkett, 1st Baronet, and Janet Murray (a granddaughter of Sir William Murray and great-granddaughter of the 1st Earl of Stirling).
- William Murray, 3rd Earl of Dunmore (1696–1756), who married Hon. Catherine Murray, daughter of William Murray, 2nd Lord Nairne, in 1728.
- Hon. Thomas Murray (1698–1764), a Lt.-Gen. in the 40th Foot who married Elizabeth Arminger.
- Lady Catherine Murray (1702–1782), who married John Murray, Master of Nairne, son of William Murray, 2nd Lord Nairne, in c. 1712.

Lord Dunmore died on 19 April 1710 and was succeeded by his son, John, as his eldest son, James, who was styled Viscount Fincastle, had died unmarried and without issue in 1704.

=== Descendants ===
Through his daughter Lady Anne, he was a grandfather of William Cochrane, 5th Earl of Dundonald, Lady Anne Cochrane (who married James Hamilton, 5th Duke of Hamilton), Lady Susan Cochrane (wife of Charles Lyon, 6th Earl of Strathmore and Kinghorne, and, after his death, George Forbes, Master of the Horse, to Prince Charles Edward Stuart), and Lady Catherine Cochrane (wife of Alexander Stewart, 6th Earl of Galloway).

Through his daughter Lady Catherine's marriage to John Nairne, he was a grandfather of one grandson who survived infancy, John Murray (father of William Murray Nairne, 5th Lord Nairne).

Peerage of Scotland
New creation	Earl of Dunmore; 1686–1710	Succeeded by John Murray
