= William Murray, Marquess of Tullibardine =

Scottish nobleman and Jacobite

Marquess of Tullibardine
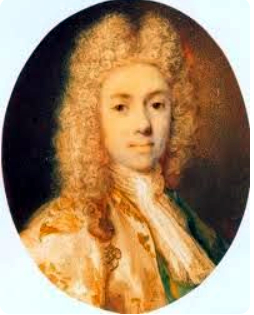
- William Murray, Marquess of Tullibardine, styled Jacobite Duke of Atholl and Rannoch

Personal details
- Born: 14 April 1689 Perth, Scotland
- Died: 9 July 1746 (aged 57) Tower of London
- Resting place: Church of St Peter ad Vincula
- Parent: John Murray, 1st Duke of Atholl (father)
- Education: University of St Andrews
- Occupation: Landowner and soldier

Military service
- Years of service: 1707–1712 (Royal Navy); 1715–1719 & 1745–1746 (Jacobite)
- Rank: Lieutenant (Royal Navy); Lieutenant General (Jacobite)
- Battles/wars: War of the Spanish Succession; Jacobite rising of 1715; Sheriffmuir; Jacobite rising of 1719; Glen Shiel; Jacobite rising of 1745; Culloden

William Murray, Marquess of Tullibardine (14 April 1689 – 9 July 1746) was a Scottish nobleman and Jacobite who took part in the rebellions of 1715, 1719, and 1745.

Attainted for his role in 1715, his younger brother James succeeded as Duke of Atholl in 1724, although Tullibardine was made Duke of Rannoch in the Jacobite peerage. After the 1719 rebellion, he spent the next 25 years in France, where he lived in extreme poverty and seemed to have suffered from physical and mental illness.

Nevertheless, he was one of the Seven Men of Moidart who accompanied Prince Charles to Scotland in July 1745, while another brother Lord George Murray served as a senior leader of the Jacobite army. Captured after Culloden in April 1746, he died in the Tower of London on 9 July.

== Personal details ==
William Murray was born on 14 April 1689, at Huntingtower near Perth, Scotland, second son of John Murray, 1st Duke of Atholl (1660–1724) and his first wife, Katherine Hamilton (1662–1707). One of more than 20 children, when his elder brother John was killed at Malplaquet in August 1709, he became Marquess of Tullibardine and heir to the dukedom. After he was attainted for his part in the Jacobite rising of 1715, his younger brother succeeded as James succeeded as Duke of Atholl in 1724.

In 1712, his father unsuccessfully attempted to arrange his marriage to Elizabeth, daughter of Tory leader Robert Harley. He never married or had children.

== The 1715 and 1719 Rebellions ==
After a period at the University of St Andrews, he joined the Royal Navy in 1707, apparently against Atholl's wishes. He served under Admiral George Byng during the War of the Spanish Succession but following appeals from his father he returned in 1712 and went to live in London. He soon fell into debt, a recurring problem throughout his life, and by 1714 was receiving regular payments from the Stuart court in Saint-Germain.

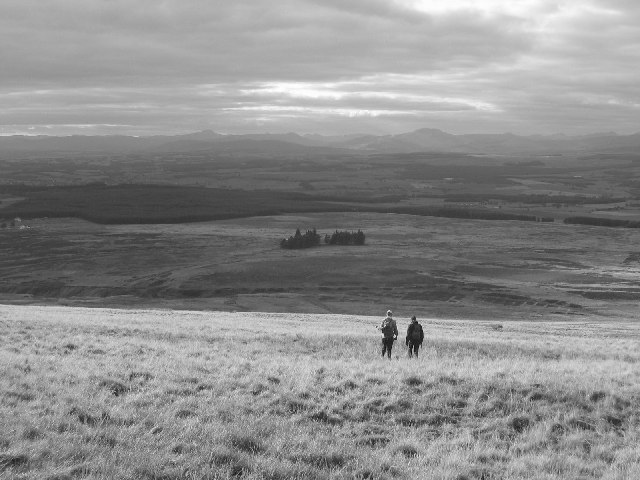
The battlefield of Sheriffmuir; the Jacobite left under Tullibardine was positioned on the flat ground below

When Queen Anne died in August 1714, she was succeeded by the Protestant Hanoverian George I, rather than her Catholic half-brother James Francis Edward. The Whigs took control of government and the Tory leaders lost their offices, including the Earl of Mar; in June 1715, he launched a rebellion at Braemar in Scotland, without prior approval from James. Although Atholl had opposed the 1707 Acts of Union, by 1715 he was a pro-Hanoverian Unionist and officially forbade his sons to participate in the Rebellion, threatening to disinherit them if they did so.

Despite this, Tullibardine and his brothers Charles (1691–1720) and George (1694–1760) joined the Jacobite army. Atholl blamed their defection on Lady Nairne (1669–1747), a committed Jacobite married to his cousin Lord William Murray (1664–1726), whose husband and sons took part in the 1715 and 1745 Risings. However, his other sons fought for the government in 1715 and like many others, Atholl had a history of balancing both sides, having spent the 1689 Rising in England. During the rising, Blair Castle was occupied by a 'Jacobite' garrison under Patrick Stewart, a trusted family retainer and besieged by his eldest son John, who was careful not to damage his ancestral home.

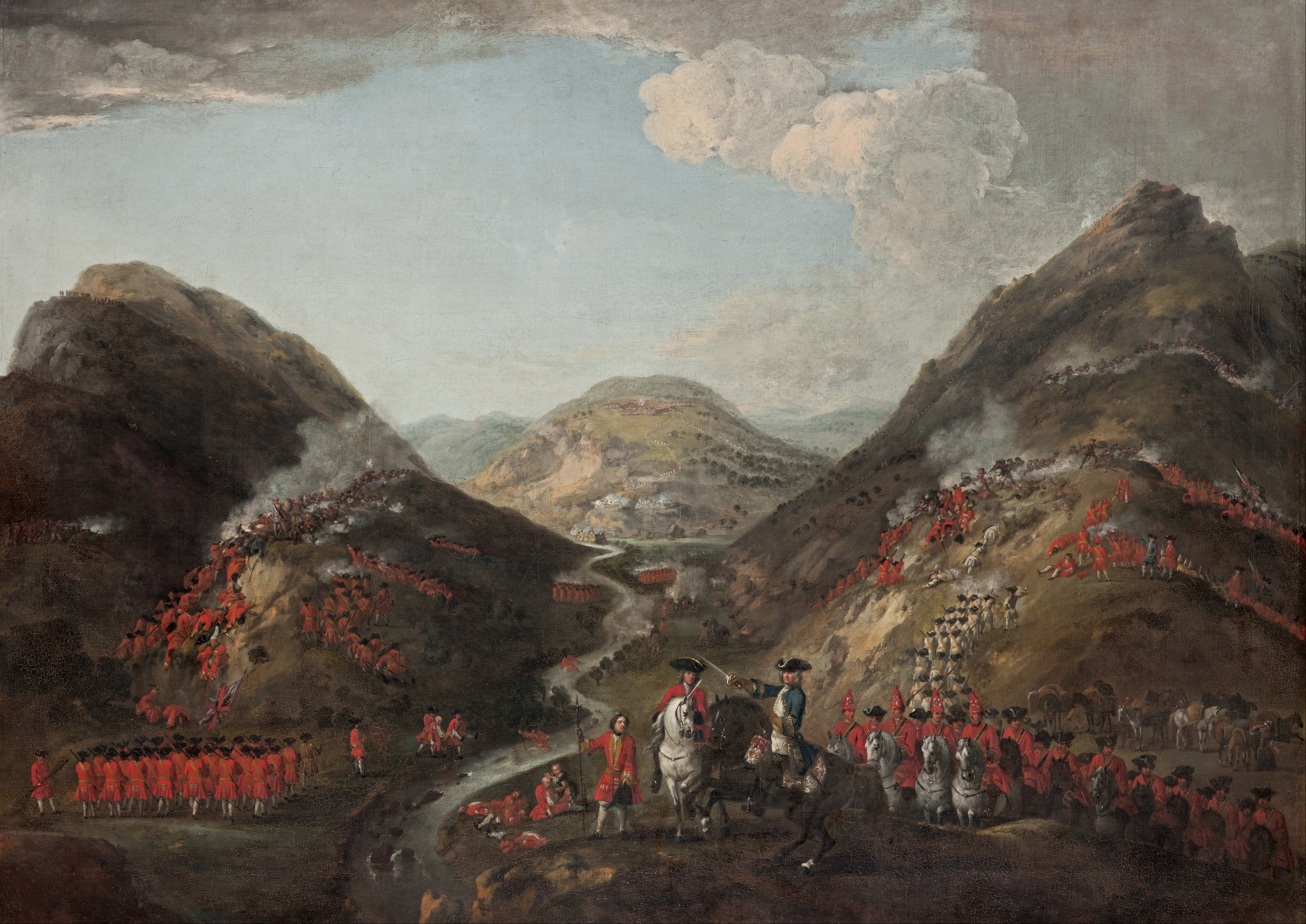
Battle of Glenshiel, June 1719; Tulibardine was wounded but escaped

Lord Charles was captured at Preston, a few days before the Battle of Sheriffmuir on 13 November, where Tullibardine commanded the left flank. The Jacobite right routed their opponents but their pursuit exposed their own centre and left wing, which now fled in their turn. While inconclusive, Sheriffmuir was a Jacobite strategic defeat and without external support the Rebellion collapsed. Lord Charles, who held a commission in the 5th Dragoons, was tried as a deserter and sentenced to be shot. Charles was pardoned but his two brothers exiled; Tullibardine was attainted and James Murray (1690–1764) replaced him as heir.

The Murrays were involved in efforts to gain support for another invasion from Sweden, then in dispute with Hanover over Swedish Pomerania and an example of the complexity caused by its ruler also being British monarch. This was resurrected as part of the 1719 Rebellion; its main component was a Spanish landing in South-West England, with a subsidiary rising in Scotland to capture Inverness and enable a Swedish naval expeditionary force to disembark.

Tullibardine and Lord George arrived in Stornoway in April 1719 where they met up with other exiles, including 300 Spanish marines under George Keith. For various reasons, only the Scottish element took place and the rebellion collapsed after defeat in the Battle of Glenshiel on 10 June; Tullibardine was wounded, as was Lord George and despite large rewards offered for their capture, both escaped once more.

The failure of the rebellion led Tullibardine to conclude a Stuart restoration was hopeless unless supported by a landing in England as well as Scotland. In a letter of 16 June 1719 to the Earl of Mar, he concluded "our being brought away so very unreasonably will I'm afraid ruin the Kings Interest and faithful subjects in these parts; seeing we came with hardly any thing that was realy (sic) necessary for such an undertaking". Senior Jacobites like the Earl of Seaforth were allowed home, while George Keith and his brother James became Prussian officers.

== Exile, the 1745 Rebellion and death ==
When their father died in 1724, James succeeded as Duke of Atholl; in 1717, Tullibardine had been created Duke of Rannoch in the Jacobite peerage and was now also referred to as Duke of Atholl, although he did not use the title. Lord George accepted a pardon and returned home in 1725, while his brother remained in Paris. Details are scarce but in a long and often incoherent letter to James Stuart of March 1723, Tullibardine announced his retirement into private life, on the grounds that he was 'unfit ... for meddling with the deep concerns of state.'

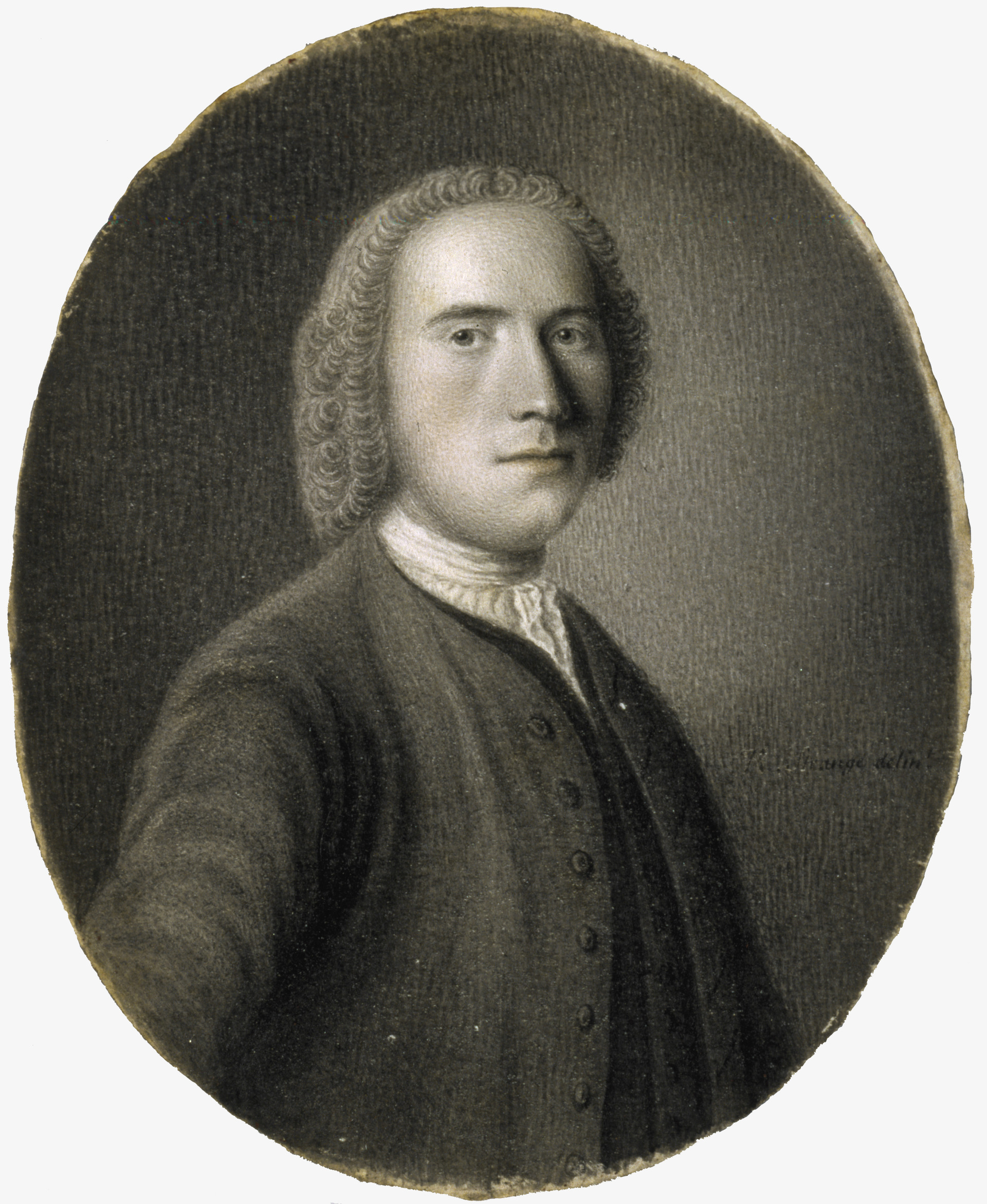
Lord George Murray (1694–1760); younger brother and fellow Jacobite, a senior leader in the 1745 Rebellion

There are indications he suffered from both physical and mental illness and was continually short of money, despite financial support from his family in Scotland. A memorandum of 1731 stated that Tullibardine had sold his horse as he was unable to buy it fodder, that he had only "a highland dress and a dressing gown of common cotton stuff" to wear and his house "had the appearance of a retreat for robbers rather than that of a grand and powerful nobleman". In 1733, he was arrested for failing to pay a wine bill of 3,000 livres. Imprisoned for debt in 1736, he was released in 1737 and sent to live with James Dunne (1700–1758), an expatriate Irish Catholic serving as priest in the village of Boin, outside Chartres.

In the 1745 Rising, Tullibardine was one of the Seven Men of Moidart who accompanied Prince Charles to Scotland. He suffered from gout and contemporaries noted he seemed closer to 70 than his true age of 58, 'had ceased to be Scotch...' and '...could scarce write his own language.' Despite this, he was of great value to the Jacobite cause as many of the Atholl tenants regarded him as the legitimate duke, rather than his brother James, which helped recruiting. His presence may also have been a factor in Lord George unexpectedly joining the Jacobite army at Perth on 3 September. Returning to Blair Castle for the first time in 30 years, he was appointed commander of Jacobite forces north of the Firth of Forth and on 30 October arrived in Edinburgh with around 600 recruits which were formed into the Duke of Atholl's Regiment, later expanded into the three-battalion "Atholl Brigade".

Tullibardine accompanied the Jacobite army when it invaded England in November and after the retreat from Derby in December returned to Perthshire to gather more men. The traditional mode of Highland warfare meant men went home in the winter and the Atholl Brigade suffered from particularly high rates of desertion; "For God's sake make examples", Lord George urged Tullibardine on 27 January, "or we shall be undone". Tullibardine and his agents reportedly used threats of violence and destruction of property to ensure recruitment and to discourage desertion.

Tullibardine rejoined Prince Charles at Culloden House on 19 February; shortly afterwards, Blair Castle was occupied by government forces under Sir Andrew Agnew. Accompanied by a servant, Tullibardine managed to escape after Culloden in April 1746, but his infirmities and age meant he was scarcely able to sit on a horse. On 27 April they reached Ross Priory in Dunbartonshire but Tullibardine was too sick to go further, and was captured by government troops. He did not arrive at the Tower of London until late June. His health had further deteriorated; he died there on 9 July before coming to trial and was buried in the Church of St Peter ad Vincula.

== Sources ==
- Atholl, John, Duke of (1907). The Chronicles of the Atholl and Tullibardine Families; Volume II. Ballentyne Press.
- Butler, James, Second Duke of Ormond (1895). Dickson, William Kirk (ed.). The Jacobite Attempt of 1719; Letters of the Duke of Ormonde to Cardinal Alberoni. Edinburgh University.
- Derr, Eric (2013). The Irish Catholic Episcopal Corps 1657–1829; Volume 2 (PHD). National University of Maynooth.
- Ehrenstein, Christoph von (2004). "Erskine, John, styled twenty-second or sixth earl of Mar and Jacobite duke of Mar (1675–1732), Jacobite army officer, politician, and architect". Oxford Dictionary of National Biography (online ed.). Oxford University Press. doi:10.1093/ref:odnb/8868. (Subscription, Wikipedia Library access or UK public library membership required.)
- Hamilton, Douglas (2014). Jacobitism, Enlightenment and Empire, 1680–1820. Routledge. ISBN 978-1848934665.
- Hill, John; Laing, David, eds. (1840). Jacobite correspondence of the Atholl family : during the rebellion, 1745–1746 : from the originals in the possession of James Erskine of Aberdona, Esq. Abbotsford.
- Kennedy, Allan (2016). "Rebellion, Government and the Scottish Response to Argyll's Rising of 1685" (PDF). Journal of Scottish Historical Studies. 36 (1): 40–59. doi:10.3366/jshs.2016.0167.
- Klinger, PF (2013). The Jacobite Rebellion of 1719; Revenge & Regrets (PDF) (PHD). East Carolina University.
- Lenman, Bruce (1980). The Jacobite Risings in Britain 1689–1746. Eyre Methuen. ISBN 0413396509.
- Macinnes, Allan (2014). Living with Jacobitism, 1690–1788: The Three Kingdoms and Beyond. Routledge. ISBN 978-1848934702.
- McCann, Jean E (1963). The Organisation of the Jacobite Army (PHD). Edinburgh University. OCLC 646764870.
- Pittock, Murray (2009). The myth of the Jacobite clans: the Jacobite Army in 1745. Edinburgh University Press. ISBN 9780748627561.
- Pittock, Murray (2004). "Murray, William, styled second duke of Atholl and marquess of Tullibardine". Oxford Dictionary of National Biography (online ed.). Oxford University Press. doi:10.1093/ref:odnb/19654. (Subscription, Wikipedia Library access or UK public library membership required.)
- Ruvigny et Raineval, Henry Massue (1904). The Jacobite Peerage, Baronetage, Knightage, and Grants of Honour (1974 ed.). Skilton. ISBN 9780284985354.
- Seton, Sir Bruce (1928). The Prisoners of the '45, Vol I. Scottish History Society.
- Szechi, Daniel; Sankey, Margaret (2001). "Elite Culture and the Decline of Scottish Jacobitism 1716-1745". Past & Present (173).
- Thompson, Ralph. "1717 and the invasion that never was". National Archives.
- Thomson, Julia (1845). Memoirs of the Jacobites of 1715 and 1745; Volume II. Richard Bentley.
