= William Drummond, 4th Viscount Strathallan =

Scottish peer and Jacobite

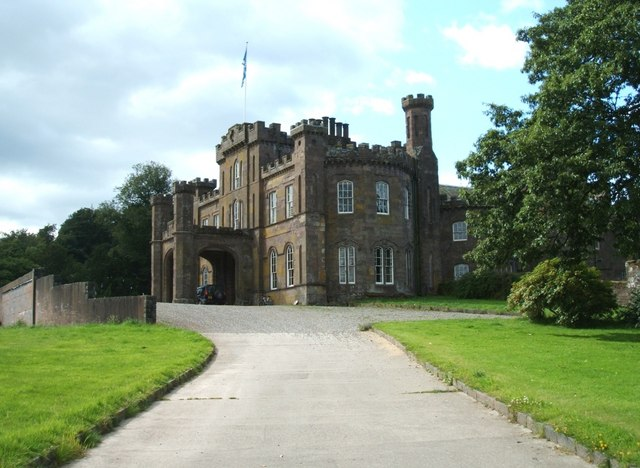
- Strathallan Castle
- Tenure: 1712 to 1746
- Predecessor: William Strathallan, 3rd Viscount Strathallan
- Successor: James Drummond (1722-1765), de jure 5th Viscount Strathallan
- Born: William Drummond; 10 June 1690; Machany House, Perthshire
- Died: 16 April 1746 (aged 55); Battle of Culloden
- Cause of death: Killed at Culloden
- Buried: Dunblane Cathedral
- Residence: Strathallan Castle
- Locality: Perthshire
- Wars and battles: 1715 Jacobite Rising; Sheriffmuir; 1745 Jacobite Rising; Prestonpans Falkirk Culloden †
- Spouse: Margaret Murray (1692-1773)
- Issue: 13 children, including James (1722-1765), William (1724-1772), Henry (1730-1795) and Robert (1728-1804)
- Parents: Sir John Drummond of Machany (died 1707); Margaret Stewart of Innernytie

William Drummond, 4th Viscount Strathallan (1690 – 16 April 1746), was a Scottish peer and Jacobite, who died at the Battle of Culloden.

Pardoned for his part in the 1715 Rising, Lord Strathallan raised a troop of cavalry for Prince Charles in 1745 and appointed Jacobite Governor of Perth. While the main army invaded England, he remained in Scotland to recruit additional troops and was replaced by Lord John Drummond in late November 1745. He died at Culloden in April 1746.

His eldest son James (1722-1765) also took part in the Rising and escaped to France. He was attainted in July 1746, losing titles and lands; his estates were repurchased by the family when he died in 1765 and the titles restored in 1824.

== Life ==
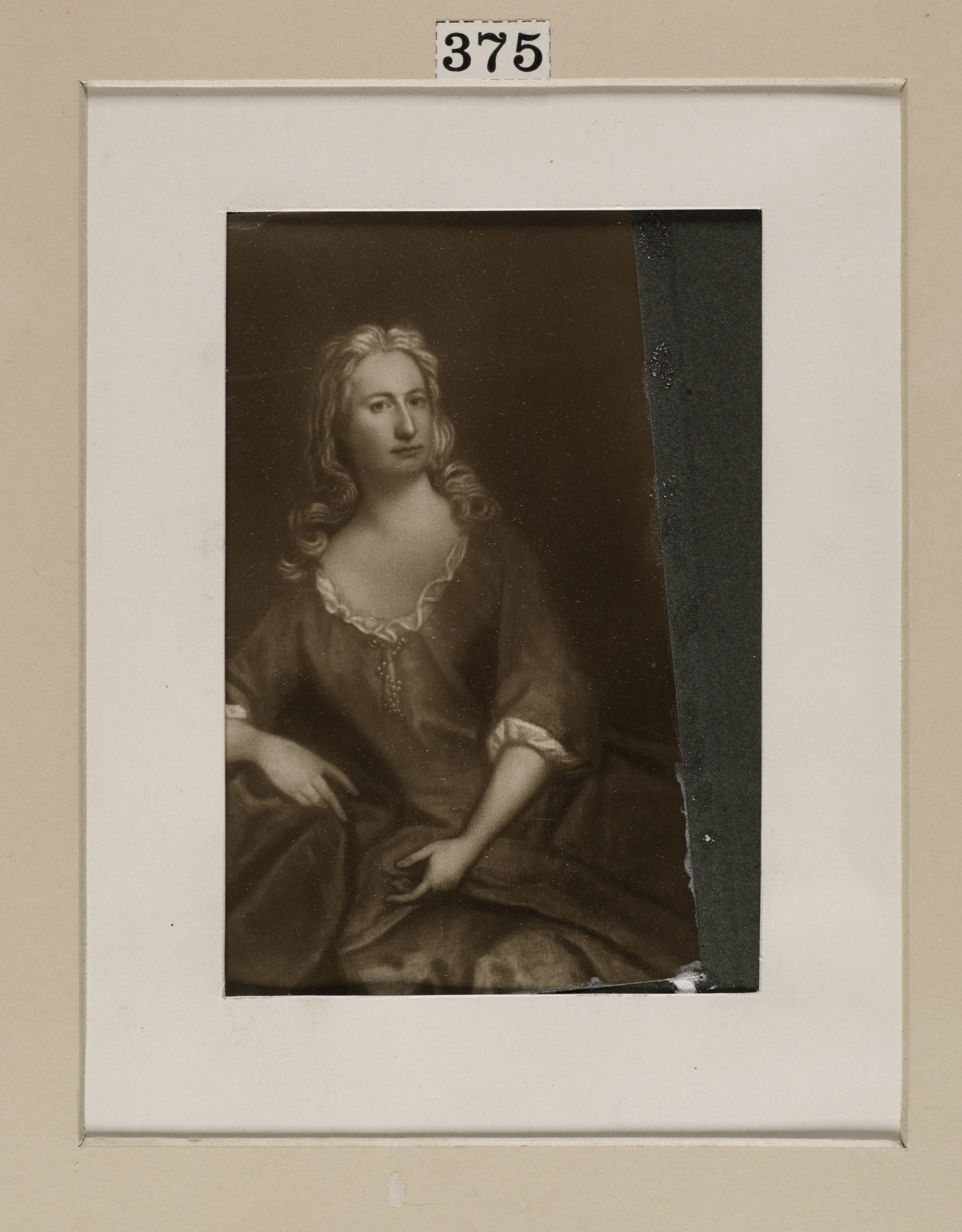
Lord Strathallan's Jacobite mother-in-law, Lady Nairne (1669-1747)

William Drummond was the eldest surviving son of Sir John Drummond of Machany (ca 1670-1707) and Margaret, daughter of Sir William Stewart of Innernytie. His date of birth is given as 1690 but there is some doubt on this point, as his 'younger' brother Andrew was born in 1688.

The Drummonds were prominent supporters of James II & VII; the senior members of the family, James, 4th Earl of Perth (1648-1716), and John, 1st Earl of Melfort (1649-1714), both converted to Catholicism and accompanied him into exile after the 1688 Glorious Revolution. In July 1690, Sir John's estates were confiscated by the Parliament of Scotland, although these were subsequently returned. Held in Stirling Castle, he was released in July 1692 on the grounds of mental illness and died in 1707.

Drummond succeeded his cousin William as Viscount Strathallan in 1711 and the next year married Margaret Murray (1692-1773). They had 13 children, including James (1722-1765), William (1724-1772), Robert (1728-1804) and Henry (1730-1795). James (1722-1765) was attainted in 1746 and died in exile, while Robert and Henry joined their uncle Andrew (1686-1769) in founding Drummonds Bank. When James died in 1765, his forfeited estates were put up for sale by the government and repurchased by his family; the title of Viscount Strathallan was restored in 1824.

Margaret also came from a Jacobite family; her father William Murray, Lord Nairne (1665-1726), was the younger brother of the 1st Duke of Atholl and fought in the 1715 Rising. Lady Nairne (1669-1747) was a committed Jacobite all her life and allegedly exercised a strong influence on her husband, son-in-law and nephews, Tullibardine (1689-1746), Lord Charles (1691-1720) and Lord George Murray (1694-1760).

== Career ==
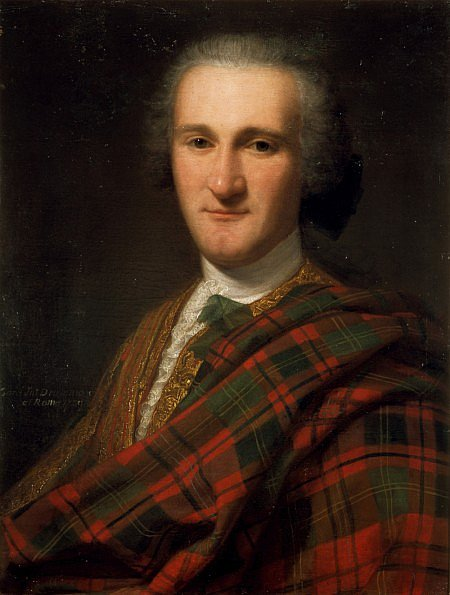
Strathallan's cousin Lord John Drummond, who replaced him as commander in Scotland

Lord Strathallan was part of a Perthshire cell of Stuart loyalists centred on the Drummond and Murray families, many of whom were also linked by marriage. Strathallan, his brother Thomas, Lord Nairne, Tullibardine, Lord Charles and Lord George Murray were among the first to join the 1715 Rising, although the Duke of Atholl avoided taking sides. Strathallan was present at the indecisive Battle of Sheriffmuir but escaped capture or prosecution before the 1717 Indemnity Act awarded all participants a general pardon.

The 1719 revolt collapsed before it reached Perthshire. Over the next few years many exiles, including Lord George Murray, accepted pardons and returned home, while the construction of military roads gave the government greater control over the Highlands. It has been argued Jacobitism survived only because of the close social bonds between a small number of families like the Drummonds.

Charles landed on Eriskay in July 1745 and launched the Rising in August; using the new roads, the Jacobites marched on Edinburgh, reaching Perth on 3 September. Here they were joined by Strathallan, Lord George Murray and several members of his extended family. He also brought 36 troopers and their servants, titled the Perthshire or Strathallan's Horse; the only Jacobite cavalry unit present at Prestonpans in September, it did not take part in the battle which lasted less than 20 minutes.

Battle of Culloden; Strathllan's troop grouped with Lord Kilmarnock's cavalry, left rear

Commanded by Lord Kilmarnock, the Perthshire Horse accompanied the invasion of England, while Strathallan remained in Perth to raise additional troops. On 21 November, Colonel Lachlan Maclachlan, killed at Culloden, was sent back to Scotland with instructions to gather these recruits and bring them into England. By the time he arrived, Strathallan had been replaced by his cousin Lord John Drummond, who countermanded these orders. As a serving officer in the French army, he had instructions not to enter England until all fortresses held by British government troops in Scotland had been taken.

In early January, the Jacobites besieged Stirling Castle and on 13th, Henry Hawley, government commander in Scotland, marched north from Edinburgh to its relief. The two forces made contact outside Falkirk on 17 January but Hawley assumed there would be no action that day. About 1:00 pm, the Jacobites began to advance; this initiated the Battle of Falkirk Muir, which took place in failing light and heavy snow and was marked by confusion on both sides. The Perthshire Horse was not engaged and although a Jacobite victory, the failure to follow up allowed Hawley's troops to retreat in good order.

On 30 January, the government army resumed its advance; weakened by desertion, the Jacobites abandoned the siege of Stirling and retreated to Inverness for the winter. Cumberland's army entered Aberdeen on 27 February and both sides suspended operations until the weather improved. By spring, the Jacobites were short of food, money and weapons and when Cumberland left Aberdeen on 8 April, the leadership agreed giving battle was their best option.

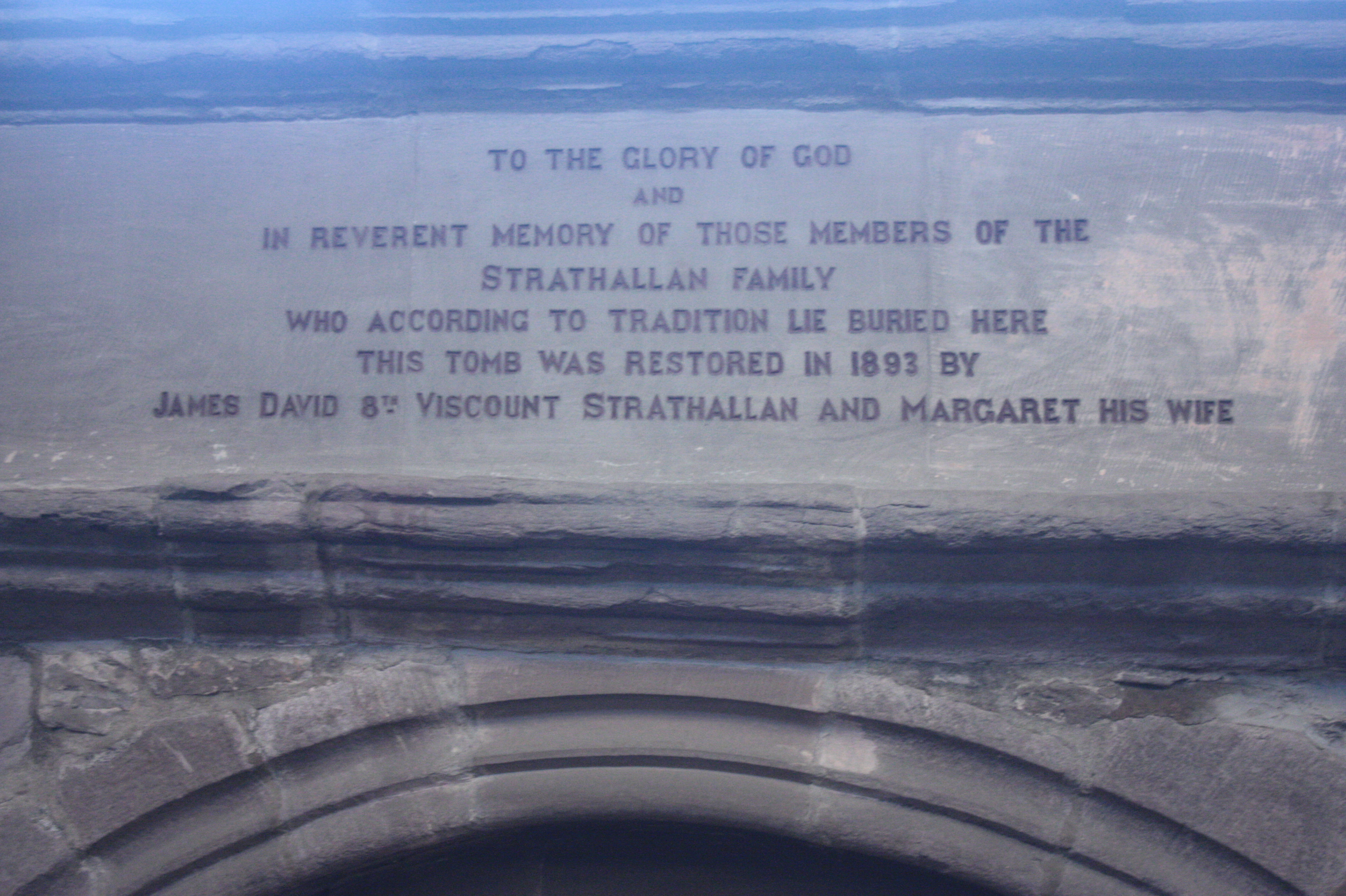
Dunblane Cathedral; Strathallan memorial

By the time of Culloden, the Perthshire Horse comprised 80-70 men, split into two troops but their horses were reportedly in very poor condition. The battle lasted less than an hour; after the Highlanders had been repelled, the government army advanced against the Jacobite second and third lines, containing the regular infantry and Lowland cavalry. Their resistance allowed Charles and his aides to escape but Strathallan's horse was killed beneath him and according to tradition, he was then run through by Colonel George Howard of the 3rd Foot. Before his death, he allegedly received a last sacrament of oatcake and whisky from John Maitland of Careston, chaplain to the Forfarshire Regiment.

He was reputedly buried in Dunblane Cathedral and the tomb restored in 1893; his wife was held in Edinburgh Castle, then released in November 1746. His eldest son James escaped to France, losing his title and lands; he received a commission in the Royal Ecossais, a regiment of Scots exiles serving in the French army. The family purchased his estates when he died in 1765 but the title was not restored until 1824.

== Sources ==
- Annand, A (1961). "The Hussars of the 45". Journal of the Society for Army Historical Research. 39 (159).
- Elcho, David (2010) [1748]. A Short Account of the Affairs of Scotland in the Years 1744–46. Kessinger Publishing. ISBN 978-1163535240.
- Furgol, Edward M (2006). Maclachlan, Lauchlan (1688–1746). Oxford DNB Online.
- Pittock, Murray (2013). Drummond, William, fourth viscount of Strathallan (Online ed.). Oxford DNB.
- Reid, Stuart (2006). The Scottish Jacobite Army 1745–46. Osprey Publishing. ISBN 978-1846030734.
- Riding, Jacqueline (2016). Jacobites: A New History of the 45 Rebellion. Bloomsbury. ISBN 978-1408819128.
- Szechi, Daniel, Sankey, Margaret (November 2001). "Elite Culture and the Decline of Scottish Jacobitism 1716-1745". Past & Present (173).
- Thomson, Katherine (1846). Memoirs of the Jacobites of 1715 and 1745, Volume III. Richard Bentley. p. 237.
- Winterbottom, Henry (2004). Drummond, Henry (1730-1795). Oxford DNB.
- Winterbottom, Philip (2010). Drummond, Andrew (1688-1769) (Online ed.). Oxford DNB.

Peerage of Scotland
Preceded by William Drummond	Viscount Strathallan; 1712–1746	Succeeded by James Drummond de jure
