= Thomas Murray (British Army officer, died 1764) =

Lieutenant-General Thomas Murray (June 1698 – 21 November 1764) was a British Army officer.

He was the seventh son of Charles Murray, 1st Earl of Dunmore; his elder brothers included General John Murray, 2nd Earl of Dunmore, Brigadier-General Robert Murray, and William Murray, 3rd Earl of Dunmore. In 1713 he was a page of honour to Queen Anne.

Murray joined the Army in 1718, and after service with the 3rd Regiment of Foot Guards he was made colonel of the 46th Regiment of Foot on 23 June 1743, a post he would hold until his death. In 1745 he was present at the Battle of Prestonpans. On 1 April 1754 he was promoted to major-general, and on 19 January 1758 to lieutenant-general.

General Murray lived at Dorney House near Weybridge, and at Princes Street, Cavendish Square, London. His wife Elizabeth (who predeceased him) was the sister of Lieutenant-General Robert Armiger; by her he had a daughter Frances Maria, who was her father's heiress.

Military offices
Preceded by John Price	Colonel of the 57th (later 46th) Regiment of Foot; 1743–1764	Succeeded by William Howe
