= John Murray, 2nd Earl of Dunmore =

Scottish peer and British Army general

General The Right Honourable The Earl of Dunmore
- Born: John Murray; 31 October 1685
- Died: 18 April 1752 (aged 66)

John Murray, 2nd Earl of Dunmore (31 October 1685 – 18 April 1752), also Viscount of Fincastle and Lord Murray of Blair, Moulin and Tullimet, was a Scottish peer and British Army general.

The second son of Charles Murray, 1st Earl of Dunmore (1661–1710), and the grandson of John Murray, 1st Marquess of Atholl, Murray became heir to his father's titles and estates in 1704 on the death of his older brother, James, Viscount Fincastle (1683–1704). He succeeded his father as Earl of Dunmore when he died, aged forty-nine, on 19 April 1710.

In 1719 he was one of the commanders of the British forces at the successful Capture of Vigo during the War of the Quadruple Alliance.

Dunmore sat in the House of Lords as a Scottish representative peer from 1713 to 1715 and again from 1727 until his death, unmarried, in 1752.

He had three younger brothers, two of whom also became British Army generals: Brigadier-General Robert Murray (1689–1738) and Lieutenant-General Thomas Murray (1698–1764); the third, William Murray (1696–1756) was a supporter of the Old Pretender and in 1746 pleaded guilty to treason, but was pardoned and in 1752 succeeded his brother as third earl.

== Notes ==
Military offices
Preceded by The Marquess of Lothian	Colonel of the 3rd Regiment of Foot Guards; 1713–1752	Succeeded by The Earl of Rothes
Preceded by Charles Churchill	Governor of Plymouth; 1745–1752	Succeeded by Sir John Ligonier
Peerage of Scotland
Preceded by Charles Murray	Earl of Dunmore; 1710–1752	Succeeded by William Murray
