= Henry Oxburgh =

Irish Jacobite

Henry Oxburgh (died 1716) was an Irish soldier and Jacobite who was one of the leaders of the Jacobite rising of 1715 in England. Captured by forces loyal to the Hanoverian Dynasty following the Battle of Preston, he was executed at Tyburn for high treason.

== Early career ==
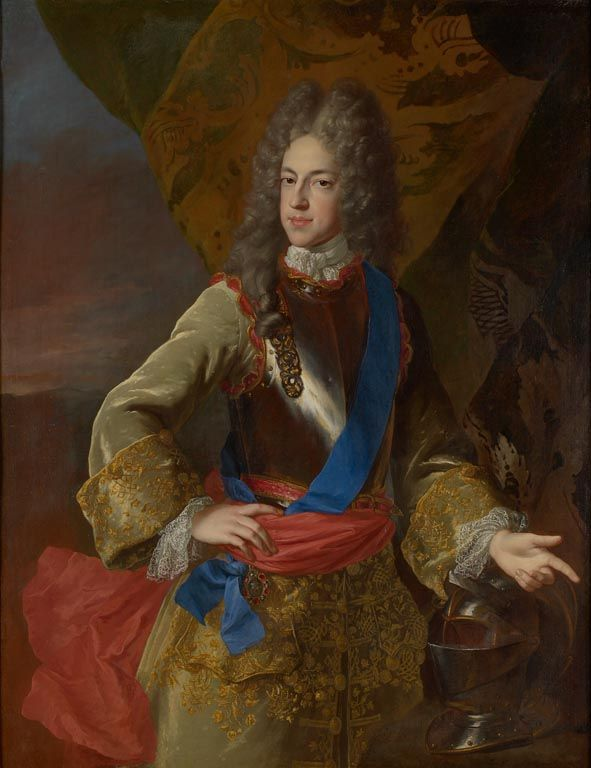
Oxburgh was a supporter of the exiled James Stuart and took up arms to put him on the throne.

Oxburgh was from a traditional Irish Catholic family. He was commissioned into a regiment raised by his relative Sir Heward Oxburgh in King's County as part of the Irish Army of James II which took part in the Williamite War in Ireland. Henry Oxburgh later joined the Wild Geese who went into exile to enlist in the armies of Louis XIV in order to continue fighting for a Jacobite restoration.

After the Peace of Ryswick he went to England and acquired an estate in Lancashire. Although notionally living as a Protestant, he was a secret Catholic as he later declared at his trial. During the War of the Spanish Succession he joined the English Army and fought in Spain under Lord Peterborough. It was there he served alongside Charles Wills and George Carpenter who he would later surrender to at Preston.

== Jacobite rebellion ==
In 1714 the Hanoverian Succession took place, and George I came to the throne. The following year supporters of the exiled James began to plan an uprising. Coinciding with a rising in Scotland, Jacobites in northern England began to assemble. Thomas Forster was placed in command, due largely to his being a Protestant, although he had no military experience. Oxburgh was made a Colonel, and acted as one of Forster's closest advisors due to his own military past.

Following the inconclusive fighting at the Battle of Preston, and surrounded by the British Army with no help of reinforcement, Oxbrugh joined with Lord Widdrington in urging Forster to surrender. Because of his past acquaintance with the British commanders he believed he could secure more generous terms, potentially allowing the Jacobite garrison to march out with the honours of war. However, considering them rebels, Wills refused to offer any terms other than immediate surrender and their throwing themselves on the mercy of the King. Increasingly out of other options, Forster agreed to surrender. Unknown to them Jacobite momentum in Scotland had been checked at the Battle of Sheriffmuir, and the rising would be crushed by the spring of the next year.

== Execution ==
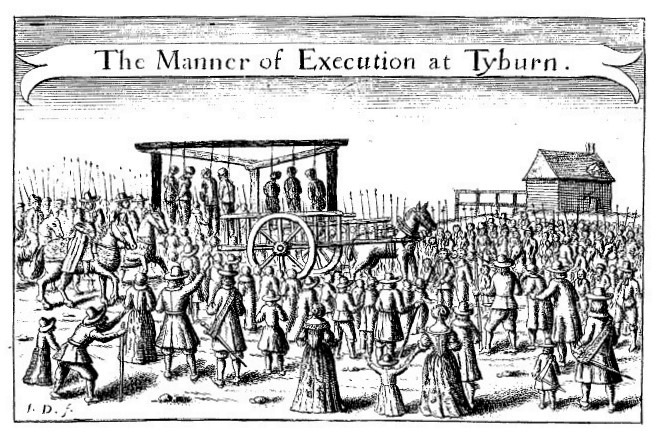
Oxburgh was executed at Tyburn, an event that led to a shift in the popular mood towards Jacobite prisoners.

On 14 May 1716 Oxburgh was taken to Tyburn where he was hanged, drawn and quartered. At the scaffold he called upon the crowd to support the restoration of "British genius" and the "ancient constitution". After his execution he was buried at St Giles while his head was displayed on a spike at Temple Bar a traditional punishment for traitors. The severity of the punishment of Oxburgh and several others, led to a backlash in the public mood, and a more liberal approach was adopted by the authorities leading to the Indemnity Act 1717 pardoning former Jacobites.

Oxburgh was one of several Jacobite leaders depicted in William Harrison Ainsworth's 1875 novel Preston Fight.

== Bibliography ==
- Anderson. Rosalind. The Jacobite Rising of 1715 and the Murray Family: Brothers in Arms. Pen and Sword History, 2020.
- Kelly, James E. & Royal, Susan. Early Modern English Catholicism: Identity, Memory and Counter-Reformation. BRILL, 2016.
- Sankey, Margaret. Jacobite Prisoners of the 1715 Rebellion: Preventing and Punishing Insurrection in Early Hanoverian Britain. Routledge, 2017.
- Storey, Neil R. London: Crime, Death & Debauchery. The History Press, 2007.
- Szechi, Daniel. 1715: The Great Jacobite Rebellion. Yale University Press, 2006.
