= James Foulis (judge) =

Scottish judge and Senator of the College of Justice

Sir James Foulis (died 1549), was a Scottish judge and Senator of the College of Justice.

Foulis was the son and heir of James de Foulis of Edinburgh (a skinner) and his wife, Margaret, who was herself the daughter of Sir James Henderson of Fordell, Fife, Lord Advocate to James IV of Scotland. On his father's side, Foulis was the grandson of William Foulis, Keeper of the Privy Seal of Scotland under James I of Scotland.

In 1519, Foulis acquired from the Master of Glencairn the lands of Colinton. Thereafter his family would incorporate Colinton into their names. He was chosen a lord of session 12 November 1526, being then member of parliament for Edinburgh, and was admitted as a member of Court of Session on 27 May 1532 shortly after it was instituted.

From 1527 onward, Foulis served as Lord Advocate alongside but subordinate to Sir Adam Otterburn. In 1529 he had briefly been private secretary to James V. From the first he was clerk register of the college, and as such was present in parliament in most years from 1535 to 1546. As such officer he was charged by license of parliament to cause the acts of the parliament to be printed by any person he wanted.

From 1532 to 1546, he was a commissioner for holding parliament, and was a member of the Privy Council of Scotland in 1542. In 1543, he was a commissioner to negotiate a marriage between the infant Queen Mary and Prince Edward of England. He was knighted in 1539, was succeeded by Thomas Marjoribanks of Ratho on 8 February 1548, and died before 4 February 1549.

== Family ==
By his wife, Catherine Brown, he was father of Henry Foulis, depute-marishal, whose son James was grandfather of Sir James Foulis, Lord Colinton.
