= James Stuart-Mackenzie =

British politician

The Right Honourable James Stuart-Mackenzie PC FRSE FSA

Keeper of the Privy Seal of Scotland
- In office 1766–1800
- Preceded by: The Earl of Breadalbane and Holland
- Succeeded by: The Viscount Melville
- In office 1763–1765
- Preceded by: The Duke of Atholl
- Succeeded by: Lord Frederick Campbell

British Minister at Turin
- In office 1758–1761
- Preceded by: The Earl of Bristol
- Succeeded by: The Lord Rivers
Parliamentary offices
Member of Parliament for Ross-shire
In office 1761–1780
Preceded by	The Lord Fortrose
Succeeded by	The Lord MacLeod
Member of Parliament for Ayr Burghs
In office 1754–1761
Preceded by	Sir Henry Erskine
Succeeded by	Lord Frederick Campbell
Member of Parliament for Buteshire
In office 1747–1754
Preceded by	Patrick Campbell
Succeeded by	James Stuart
Member of Parliament for Argyllshire
In office 1742–1747
Preceded by	Charles Campbell
Succeeded by	Sir Duncan Campbell of Lochnell

Personal details
- Born: James Stuart; 30 October 1718 Rothesay, Isle of Bute, Scotland
- Died: 8 April 1800 (aged 81) London, England
- Spouse: Lady Elizabeth Campbell (m. 1749; died 1799)
- Parent(s): James Stuart, 2nd Earl of Bute; Lady Anne Campbell
- Education: University of Leiden; Eton College

James Stuart-Mackenzie (30 October 1718 – 8 April 1800) was a British politician who co-founded the Royal Society of Edinburgh in 1783. The second son of James Stuart, 2nd Earl of Bute, he served as Member of Parliament for various Scottish constituencies of the Parliament of Great Britain from 1742 to 1780. Stuart-Mackenzie was the British Minister at Turin from 1758 to 1761. He was made a Privy Councillor in 1761, and served as Keeper of the Privy Seal of Scotland from 1763 to 1765, and again from the following year until his death in 1800.

== Life ==
Born James Stuart, he was a younger son of James Stuart, 2nd Earl of Bute, and his wife Lady Anne Campbell, daughter of Archibald Campbell, 1st Duke of Argyll. Prime Minister John Stuart, 3rd Earl of Bute, was his elder brother.

He was educated at Eton College 1728 to 1732 then travelled to Europe to study at the University of Leyden where he graduated in 1737.

He inherited the Rosehaugh estates near Avoch in Ross-shire through his paternal grandmother Agnes Mackenzie and assumed the additional surname of Mackenzie. He was returned to Parliament for Buteshire in 1747, a seat he held until 1754, and then represented Ross-shire from 1761 to 1780. In 1761 he was sworn of the Privy Council. In 1763 he became Keeper of the Privy Seal of Scotland until 1765 and then again in 1766 until his death.

In 1752 Hon. James Stewart Mackenzie sold Rosehaugh and bought from Sir Thomas and William Nairn the ecclesiastical lands of Kirkhill in Meigle, which belonged to the Holy Trinity of Dunkeld, and upon the site of the former Castle, which had been used as a grange for the Churchmen, he erected Belmont Castle, at a cost of £10,000.

He was a very studious man and a great astronomer. A telescope, purportedly specially made for him, is in the Robert Whipple Collection at the University of Cambridge. He was responsible for the building of the observatory on Kinpurnie Hill, then part of his estate. The observatory was designed by Alexander Bryce (1713 - 1786), Minister of Kirknewton and East Calder, but remained incomplete.

He died on 6 April 1800.

== Family ==
Stuart-Mackenzie married his first cousin Lady Elizabeth Campbell, daughter of John Campbell, 2nd Duke of Argyll, in 1749. They had no surviving children. She died in July 1799. Stuart-Mackenzie survived her by less than a year and died in April 1800. According to a decision in 1803 his estates were passed on to his nephew James Stuart-Wortley-Mackenzie.

He was brother-in-law to Robert Bruce, Lord Kennet.

== Notes ==
Parliament of Great Britain
Preceded by Charles Campbell	Member of Parliament for Argyllshire; 1742–1747	Succeeded by Sir Duncan Campbell of Lochnell
Preceded by Patrick Campbell (to 1741)	Member of Parliament for Buteshire; 1747–1754	Succeeded by James Stuart (from 1761)
Preceded by Sir Henry Erskine	Member of Parliament for Ayr Burghs; 1754–1761	Succeeded by Lord Frederick Campbell
Preceded by Lord Fortrose	Member of Parliament for Ross-shire; 1761–1780	Succeeded by John Mackenzie
Diplomatic posts
Preceded by The Earl of Bristol	British Minister at Turin; 1758–1761	Succeeded by George Pitt
Political offices
Preceded by The Duke of Atholl	Keeper of the Privy Seal of Scotland; 1763–1765	Succeeded by Lord Frederick Campbell
Preceded by The Earl of Breadalbane and Holland	Keeper of the Privy Seal of Scotland; 1766–1800	Succeeded by Henry Dundas
