= Robert Nairne, 1st Lord Nairne =

Scottish judge

Robert Nairne, 1st Lord Nairne (1600–1683) of Strathord, was a Scottish judge.

== Life ==
He was the eldest son of Robert Nairne of Muckersie, and afterwards of Strathord, both in Perthshire, by Margaret, daughter of Sir John Preston of Penicuick, Midlothian, lord-president of the court of session. Like his father, he became a member of the Faculty of Advocates.

With other royalists Nairne was captured by a detachment from General George Monck at Alyth, Forfarshire, 28 August 1651 in an incident known as 'the Onfall of Alyth', and sent a prisoner to the Tower of London, where he remained till the Restoration of 1660. By Charles II he was appointed a lord of session, 1 June 1661, and was knighted; and on 11 January 1671 he was appointed to the court of justiciary. On 23 Jan. 1681 he was created a peer of Scotland by the title of Lord Nairne, to himself for life, and after his decease to his son-in-law, Lord William Murray, who assumed the surname of Nairne.

At the trial of Archibald Campbell, 9th Earl of Argyll in 1681 Nairne was compelled from fatigue to retire while the pleadings on the relevancy were still proceeding. The judges who remained being equally divided, and the Duke of Queensberry, who presided, being unwilling to vote, Nairne was sent for to give his vote. According to Robert Wodrow he fell asleep while the pleadings for the relevancy were being read to him, but on being awakened voted for the relevancy of the indictment. On 10 April 1683 Lord Castlehill was appointed to be one of the criminal lords in place of Lord Nairne, who was excused from attendance on account of his great age.

== Family ==
By his wife Margaret, daughter of Patrick Graham of Inchbrakie, Perthshire, Nairne had an only daughter, Margaret, married to Lord William Murray, who became second Lord Nairne.

== Notes ==
Attribution

This article incorporates text from a publication now in the public domain: Lee, Sidney, ed. (1894). "Nairne, Robert". Dictionary of National Biography. Vol. 40. London: Smith, Elder & Co.

Peerage of Scotland
New creation	Lord Nairne; 1681–1683	Succeeded by William Murray
