= William Foulis (Keeper of the Privy Seal) =

Scottish political figure

William Foulis (fl. 1420s – 1440s) was a 15th-century Scottish political figure. He was archdeacon of St. Andrews, provost of Bothwell, and Keeper of the Privy Seal of Scotland in the late 1420s and into the 1430s, under James I of Scotland. He was also briefly the Secretary of State of Scotland, in 1429.

By a daughter of Sir William Ogilvie, Foulis had two sons, of whom James, the younger, became a merchant in Edinburgh. James, in turn, was the father of the eminent judge, James Foulis.

Political offices
Preceded by John Cameron	Keeper of the Privy Seal of Scotland; 1426–1442	Succeeded by William Turnbull
