= James Murray, 2nd Duke of Atholl =

British politician (1690–1764)

His Grace The Duke of Atholl KT PC
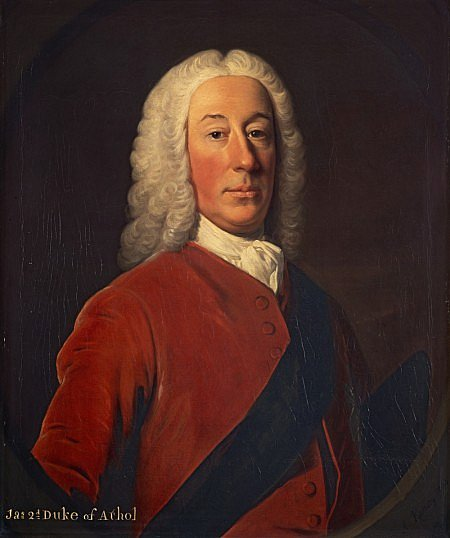
- Portrait by Allan Ramsay.

Keeper of the Great Seal of Scotland
- In office 1763–1764
- Preceded by: The Duke of Queensberry
- Succeeded by: The Earl of Marchmont

Keeper of the Privy Seal of Scotland
- In office 1733–1763
- Preceded by: The Earl of Ilay
- Succeeded by: James Stuart-Mackenzie

Member of Parliament for Perthshire
- In office 10 February 1715 – 31 December 1724
- Preceded by: Lord James Murray
- Succeeded by: David Graeme

Personal details
- Born: James Murray; 28 September 1690 Edinburgh, Scotland
- Died: 8 January 1764 (aged 73) Dunkeld, Perthshire, Scotland
- Spouses: Jane Frederick (m. 1726; died 1748) Jean Drummond (m. 1749)
- Children: John Murray, Marquess of Tullibardine; Lady Jane Murray; Charlotte Murray, Duchess of Atholl; James Murray, Marquess of Tullibardine
- Parent(s): John Murray, 1st Duke of Atholl; Lady Catherine Hamilton

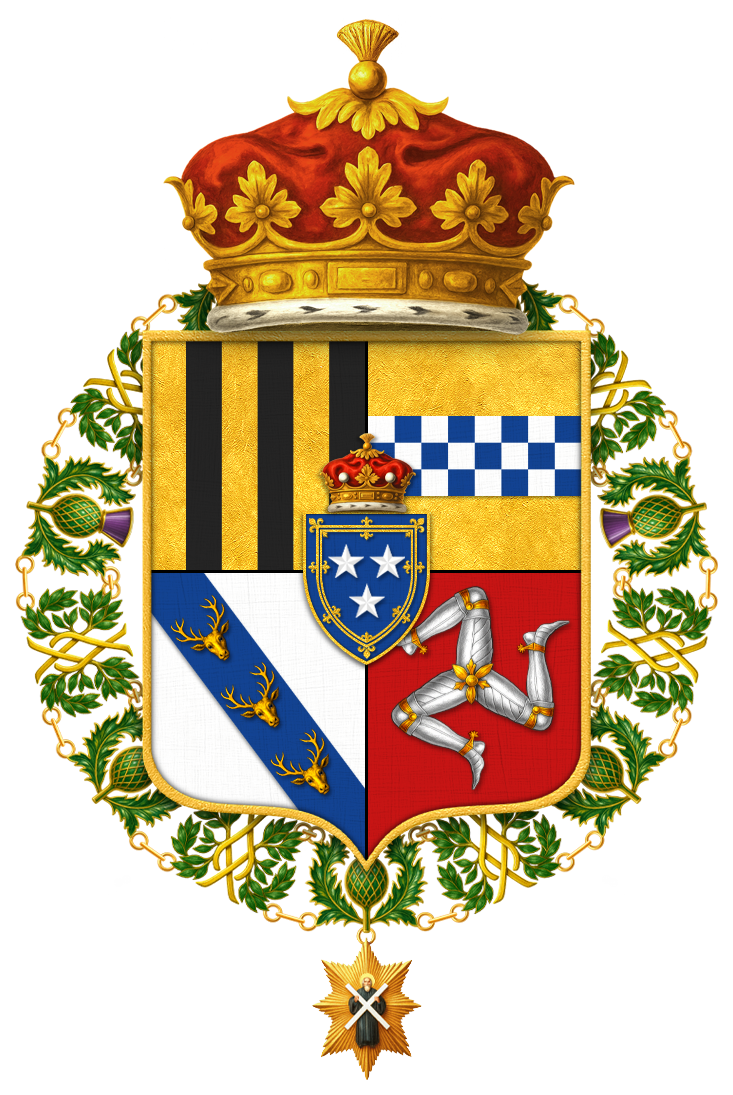
Quartered arms of James Murray, 2nd Duke of Atholl, KT, PC

James Murray, 2nd Duke of Atholl, KT, PC (28 September 1690 – 8 January 1764), styled Marquess of Tullibardine between 1715 and 1746, was a British politician.

== Life ==
Atholl was born in Edinburgh, Scotland and was the third son of John Murray, 1st Duke of Atholl and Lady Katherine Hamilton.

Vesting Duke of Atholl in James Murray Act 1715
- Act of Parliament
- Parliament of Great Britain
- Long title: An Act for vesting the Honour and Estate of John Duke of Atholl in James Murray Esquire, commonly called Lord James Murray, after the Death of the said Duke.
- Citation: 1 Geo. 1. St. 2. c. 34 Pr.
- Territorial extent: [[Great Britain[]]

Dates
- Royal assent: 23 March 1716
- Commencement: 17 March 1715 (Note: Start of session.)
Other legislation
Amended by	Duke of Atholl's Estate (Amendment) Act 1732

Status: Amended

In 1712, he was made captain of the grenadier company of the 1st Foot Guards. On the attainder in 1715 of his elder brother, William Murray, Marquess of Tullibardine, for taking part in the Jacobite rising, an act was passed by Parliament, the Vesting Duke of Atholl in James Murray Act 1715 (1 Geo. 1. St. 2. c. 34 Pr.) vesting the family honours and estates in him as the next heir. After the conclusion of the rebellion, he appears to have gone to Edinburgh to represent in as favourable a light as possible to the government the services of his father, in order to procure for him a sum of money in name of compensation.

Duke of Atholl's Estate (Amendment) Act 1732
- Act of Parliament
- Parliament of Great Britain
- Long title: An Act to explain and amend an Act passed in the First Year of the Reign of His late Majesty King George the First, intituled, "An Act for vesting the Honour and Estate of John Duke of Atholl in James Murray (commonly called Lord James Murray), after the Death of the said Duke."
- Citation: 6 Geo. 2. c. 14 Pr.
- Territorial extent: Great Britain

Dates
- Royal assent: 17 May 1733
- Commencement: 16 January 1733
Other legislation
Amends	Vesting Duke of Atholl in James Murray Act 1715

Status: Current legislation

At the election of 1715, he was chosen MP for Perth, and he was re-elected in 1722. He succeeded to the peerage on the death of his father in 1724; and in 1733 an act of Parliament, the Duke of Atholl's Estate (Amendment) Act 1732 (6 Geo. 2. c. 14 Pr.) was passed to explain and extend the act of 1715, by providing that the attainder of William, marquis of Tullibardine, should not extend to prevent any descent of honour and estate to James, Duke of Atholl, and his issue, or to any of the issue or heirs male of John, late Duke of Atholl, other than the said William Murray and his issue.

In June 1724, he was made Lord Privy Seal, succeeding Lord Ilay, and on 21 September, he was chosen a representative peer. He was appointed Keeper of the Privy Seal of Scotland in 1733.He was re-elected as representative peer in 1734, and during the same year was invested with the Order of the Thistle. As maternal grandson of James Stanley, 7th Earl of Derby, Atholl succeeded to the sovereignty of the Isle of Man, and to the ancient barony of Strange, of Knockyn, Wotton, Mohun, Burnel, Basset, and Lacy, on the death of James, 10th Earl of Derby, in 1736.

From 1737 to the general election of 1741, he sat in Parliament both as an English baron and as a Scottish representative peer. On the approach of the highland army after the Jacobite rising of 1745, Atholl fled southwards, and his elder brother, the Marquis of Tullibardine, took possession of Blair Castle. Atholl, however, joined the army of the Duke of Cumberland in England, and, arriving with him in Edinburgh on 30 January 1746, went northwards. On 9 February, he sent a summons to his vassals to attend at Dunkeld and Kirkmichael and join the king's troops. On 6 April 1763, Atholl resigned the office of privy seal on being appointed keeper of the great seal in succession to Charles Douglas (1698–1778), Duke of Queensberry and Dover. He was also at the same time made lord justice general.

The Duke and the first Duchess were patrons of the portrait painter Jeremiah Davison.

Having been given several Larch Trees from the Menzies of Culdares, He became the first to plant European Larch in Great Britain; one of a group of five near Dunkeld cathedral planted in 1738 is still alive. Therefore it is not only the Duke of Atholl, but also the Menzies clan, that can be credited with introducing Larch Trees to Scotland as well as Great Britain.

He died at Dunkeld on 8 January 1764, in his seventy-fourth year, and was buried at Inveresk.

He was succeeded by in the barony of Strange by his daughter, Lady Charlotte, and in the Scottish titles by his nephew, John, the son of George Murray, a general in the Jacobite rising of 1745 which the second Duke did not join.

== Family ==
Atholl married firstly Jane, daughter of Thomas Frederick (son of Sir John Frederick, Lord Mayor of London), on 28 April 1726. They had four children:

- John Murray, Marquess of Tullibardine (1728–1729), died in infancy.
- Lady Jane Murray, Countess of Crawford (c. 1730–1747)
- Lady Charlotte Murray (1731–1805)
- James Murray, Marquess of Tullibardine (1735–1736), died in infancy.

After his first wife's death in 1748 he married secondly Jean, daughter of John Drummond, 10th of Lennoch, on 7 May 1749, in Edinburgh. There were no children from this marriage.

== Notes ==
Parliament of Great Britain
Preceded by Lord James Murray	Member for Perthshire; 1715–1724	Succeeded by David Graeme
Political offices
Preceded by The Duke of Argyll	Keeper of the Privy Seal of Scotland; 1733–1763	Succeeded by Hon. James Stuart-Mackenzie
Preceded by The Duke of Queensbury	Keeper of the Great Seal of Scotland; 1763–1764	Succeeded by The Earl of Marchmont
Peerage of Scotland
Preceded by John Murray	Duke of Atholl; 1724–1764	Succeeded by John Murray
Peerage of England
Preceded by James Stanley	Baron Strange; 1736–1764	Succeeded by Charlotte Murray
Head of State of the Isle of Man
Preceded by James Stanley	Lord of Mann; 1736–1764	Succeeded by John Murray
