= William Murray, 2nd Lord Nairne =

Scottish Jacobite soldier and peer

William Murray, 2nd Lord Nairne (c. 1665 – 3 February 1726) was a Scottish peer and Jacobite who fought in the Rising of 1715, after which he was attainted and condemned to death for treason, but in 1717 he was indemnified and released.

In 1721, he was created Earl of Nairne in the Jacobite peerage.

== Life ==
Born about 1665, the fourth son of John Murray, 1st Marquess of Atholl, by his marriage to Lady Amelia Sophia, a daughter of James Stanley, 7th Earl of Derby, Murray was the younger brother of John Murray, 1st Duke of Atholl. His grandmother, Charlotte Stanley, Countess of Derby (1599–1664), a daughter of Claude de La Trémoille, Duke of Thouars (1566–1604) was famous in her own right for her defence of Lathom House against Parliamentary forces during the First English Civil War in 1644.

In February 1680 William Murray married ten-year-old Margaret Nairne (born on 16 December 1669), the only daughter and heiress of Robert Nairne. In 1681 Nairne, an octogenarian who had no sons, was created by King Charles II Lord Nairne, in the peerage of Scotland, with a special remainder to his son-in-law. Thus, when Nairne died on 30 May 1683, Murray succeeded him in the peerage. He also inherited the Nairne estate in Perthshire and the family seat, the House of Nairne, which he rebuilt and greatly expanded from 1706 to the designs of Sir William Bruce following a fire in 1705.

He took his seat in the Parliament of Scotland on 22 October 1690, but he never took the oath of allegiance to the new monarchs, William III and Mary II, who in the Glorious Revolution of 1688 had unseated the last Stuart king, James II.

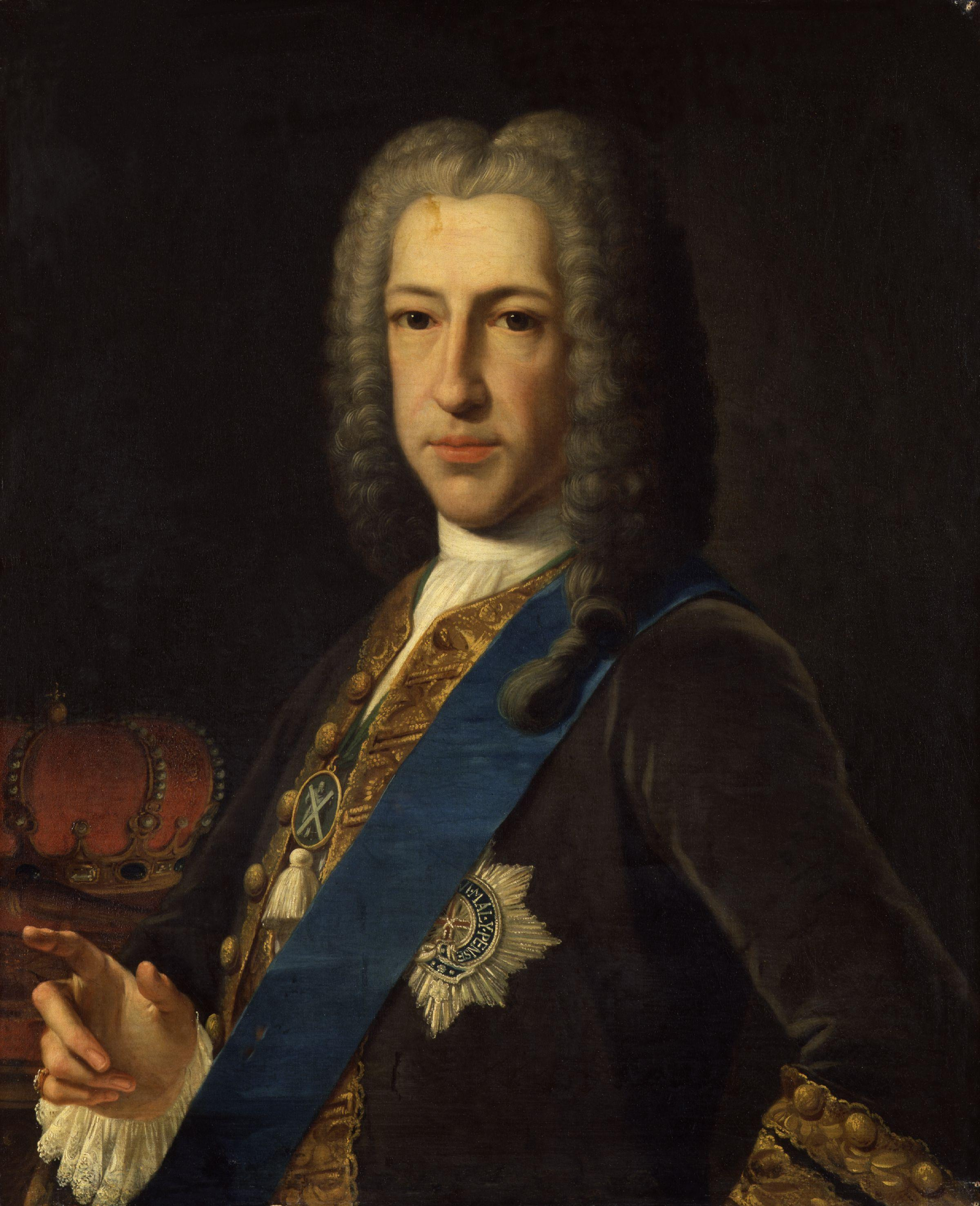
The Old Pretender

Unlike his brother John, who had taken the side of William and Mary and was created Earl of Tullibardine by William in 1696 and Duke of Atholl by Queen Anne, Nairne's loyalties remained with King James and his heirs. At the time of the Jacobite rising of 1715, Nairne was one of the first to rally to the cause of the Old Pretender when John Erskine, Earl of Mar, proclaimed him King at Braemar on 6 September 1715, and Nairne fought through Mar's autumn campaign. On 14 November 1715, after the disastrous Battle of Preston, Nairne was taken prisoner and was sent from there to the Tower of London.

On 9 February 1716 Nairne was tried for treason, found guilty, attainted, and condemned to death. However, his execution was stayed and he lived to benefit from the Indemnity Act 1717, so in December of that year was released. On 24 June 1721 he was created Earl of Nairne in the Jacobite peerage and died on 3 February 1726. His widow survived him until 1747.

== Children and posterity ==
- John, Master of Nairne (c. 1691 – 11 July 1770). Like his sister he married one of the children of Charles Murray, 1st Earl of Dunmore, Lady Catherine. They had three sons who survived infancy. He would likewise fight as a Jacobite during the Rising, but survived, and escaped to Sweden, and eventually settled in France.
- Hon. Margaret married William Drummond, 4th Viscount Strathallan, in 1712, and they had four sons, James, Robert, William, and Henry Drummond. She lived until 1773. Her husband and eldest son took part in the Forty-Five, during which Strathallan was killed at Culloden on 16 April 1745, and after which her son was attainted. However, her grandson James Andrew Drummond was restored to the family's honours by an Act of Parliament of 1824, thus regaining the title of Viscount Strathallan. In 1902 his heir succeeded a distant kinsman as Earl of Perth.
- Hon. Catherine who married William Murray, 3rd Earl of Dunmore, son of Charles Murray, 1st Earl of Dunmore. They had three sons, and two daughters.
- Hon. Robert (d. 16 Apr 1746). He married Jean Mercer of Aldie, daughter of Sir Laurence Mercer of Aldie and Helen Mercer (maternal granddaughter of Sir Thomas Stewart, 12th Laird of Grandtully. They had a son, and a daughter. He was killed at the Battle of Culloden. Their granddaughter Jane married George Elphinstone, 1st Viscount Keith and was the mother of Margaret Mercer Elphinstone, who became heiress of the Lordship of Nairne in 1837.
- Hon. Henrieta Murray (born 1714). Died unmarried.
- Hon. Charlotte, who married John Robertson, 11th Laird of Lude. They had two sons, and a daughter.
- Hon. May Marjorie, who married Duncan Robertson, 14th Chief of Clan Donnachaidh. They had at least two sons, and a daughter.

== Notes ==
Peerage of Scotland
New creation	— TITULAR — Earl of Nairne; Jacobite peerage 1721–1726	Succeeded by John Nairne
Preceded by Robert Nairne	Lord Nairne; 1683–1716	Forfeit restored in 1824 to William Murray Nairne
