= Margaret Nairne, 2nd Lady Nairne =

Scottish noblewoman (1669–1747)

Margaret Nairne, 2nd Baroness Nairne, later Countess of Nairne, (1669 – 14 November 1747) was a Scottish noblewoman at the turn of the 18th century and active in the Jacobite cause for its duration. Her husband, William Murray, 2nd Lord Nairne, was condemned to death for his role in plans for a Scottish rebellion supported by neighbouring France; Lady Margaret travelled from Edinburgh to London to agitate in person for her husband's reprieve from execution, which was eventually successful.

== Family ==
Margaret was born in Edinburgh in 1669, the only child of Margaret Graham and Robert Nairne, Lord Strathord and 1st Lord Nairne. After her father's death in 1683 Margaret became Baroness Nairne in her own right for seven years.

As was typical among aristocratic families of the time Margaret's engagement was arranged (or 'contracted'). Her first engagement was to Lord George Murray but this contract was nullified due to Lord George's ongoing poor health, and in 1690 Margaret married his brother William (b. 1664) instead. Because Margaret was sole heir to her family's title, upon their marriage her husband became the 2nd Lord Nairne and was elevated to the rank of earl.

Margaret bore twelve children including John, later 3rd Lord Nairne. All but one of the children were staunch Jacobites; son Robert was killed at the Battle of Culloden (16 April 1746) and daughter Margaret imprisoned the same year for her active support of the rebellion.

== Jacobite activity ==
The Jacobite rising sought to restore the exiled House of Stuart to the throne in England, Scotland and Ireland and the Nairnes were active participants in the rebellion. Margaret's husband and their eldest son, John, were captured at the Battle of Preston in November 1715 and taken to London on a charge of High Treason to await their fate; Lord Nairne was sent to the Tower of London and John to Newgate prison while Margaret immediately journeyed south to see them. A reprieve was finally granted by George I and Lord Nairne was released in August 1717.

The difficulties and dangers of the rising did not appear to dampen Margaret's commitment to the Jacobite cause, and upon Bonnie Prince Charlie's return to Scotland in 1745 she entertained him at Nairne House.

== Letters ==
Correspondence written by Margaret and her husband to family and friends over the course of the first half of the eighteen century document both their personal and political concerns, including £5,000 of domestic repairs after a fire at the family home which had 'a window for every day of the year'. One series of letters written by Lady Margaret documents her journey to London to seek a royal audience in order to plead for her husband's release from the Tower where she lived with him for a time in 1716.
