= David Graeme (Stirlingshire MP) =

Scottish politician

David Graeme (c. 1676 – 14 March 1726) was a Scottish politician.

He was elected at a by-election in December 1724 as the Member of Parliament (MP) for Stirlingshire, and held the seat until his death in 1726, aged about 50.

Parliament of Great Britain
Preceded by Lord James Murray	Member of Parliament for Perthshire; 1724–1726	Succeeded by Mungo Haldane
