= John Murray, 1st Earl of Atholl =

Scottish royalist nobleman (1605–1642)

John Murray, 1st Earl of Atholl (c.1605-June 1642) was a Scottish nobleman and Chief of Clan Murray, who became Earl of Atholl in 1629. He was the son of William Murray, 2nd Earl of Tullibardine and Dorothea née Stewart, daughter of John Stewart, 5th Earl of Atholl.

== Support for the Crown ==
When conflict erupted between King Charles I and the Covenanters, Murray strongly supported the king. As chief of Clan Murray, he was able to raise around 1,800 highland men for the royal cause, making him one of the most important royalist magnates in central Scotland.

== Imprisonment ==
In 1640, his rival Archibald Campbell, 1st Marquess of Argyll invaded Atholl territory. Murray was captured and imprisoned in Stirling Castle. He was eventually released after paying a large ransom and agreeing to provide troops to the Covenanter Army. Despite this, his sympathies remained with the crown.

== Family ==
Murray married Jean Campbell, daughter of Duncan Campbell of Glenorchy and had five children:

- John Murray, 1st Marquess of Atholl (1631-1703), inherited the Earldom of Atholl at eleven years old, was elevated to Marquess in 1676. He married Amelia Stanley, daughter of James Stanley, 7th Earl of Derby.
- Anne Murray (1633-1665), married her 1st cousin once removed, James Murray, 2nd Earl of Tullibardine.
- Sir Mungo Murray of Garth (1633-1671), never married.
- Jean Murray (1635-1688), never married.
- Margaret Murray (1642-?), married John Cunningham of Caprington and Lambroughton Kilmaurs, 1st Baronet of Nova Scotia.
