= Forfeit =

Forfeit or forfeiture may refer to:

== Arts, entertainment, and media ==
- Forfeit, a 2007 thriller film starring Billy Burke
- "Forfeit", a song by Chevelle from Wonder What's Next
- Forfeit/Fortune, a 2008 album by Crooked Fingers

== Law ==
- Asset forfeiture, in law, the confiscation of assets related to a crime
- Forfeiture (law), deprivation or destruction of a right in consequence of not performing an obligation or condition

== Sports ==
- Forfeit (sport), a premature end of a game
  - Forfeit (baseball)
  - Forfeit (chess), defeat in a chess game by a player's being absent or out of time
  - Declaration and forfeiture, in cricket, two possible ends of an innings

== See also ==
- Forfaiting, a financial term
- Walkover, when a contestant is awarded victory because there are no other contestants
