= Robert Murray (British Army officer, born 1689) =

Scottish soldier and Member of Parliament

Brigadier-General The Honourable Robert Murray MP
- Born: 7 January 1689
- Died: 25 March 1738 (aged 49)

Brigadier-General Robert Murray (7 January 1689 – 25 March 1738) was a Scottish soldier and Member of Parliament, the third son of Charles Murray, 1st Earl of Dunmore and younger brother of John Murray, 2nd Earl of Dunmore.

== Background ==
After service with the 3rd Regiment of Foot Guards, he was colonel of the 37th Regiment of Foot from 1722 to 1735 and of the 38th Regiment of Foot from 1735 to his death. He was ultimately promoted Brigadier-General in 1735. He was MP for Wootton Bassett from 1722 to 1727 and for Great Bedwyn from 1734 to 1738. He died in March 1738 aged 49.

Military offices
Preceded by Edward Jones	Colonel of Murray's Regiment of Foot; 1735–1738	Succeeded by The Duke of Marlborough
Preceded by Viscount Hinchingbrooke	Colonel of Murray's Regiment of Foot; 1722–1735	Succeeded by Hon. Henry Ponsonby
