= Keeper of the Privy Seal of Scotland =

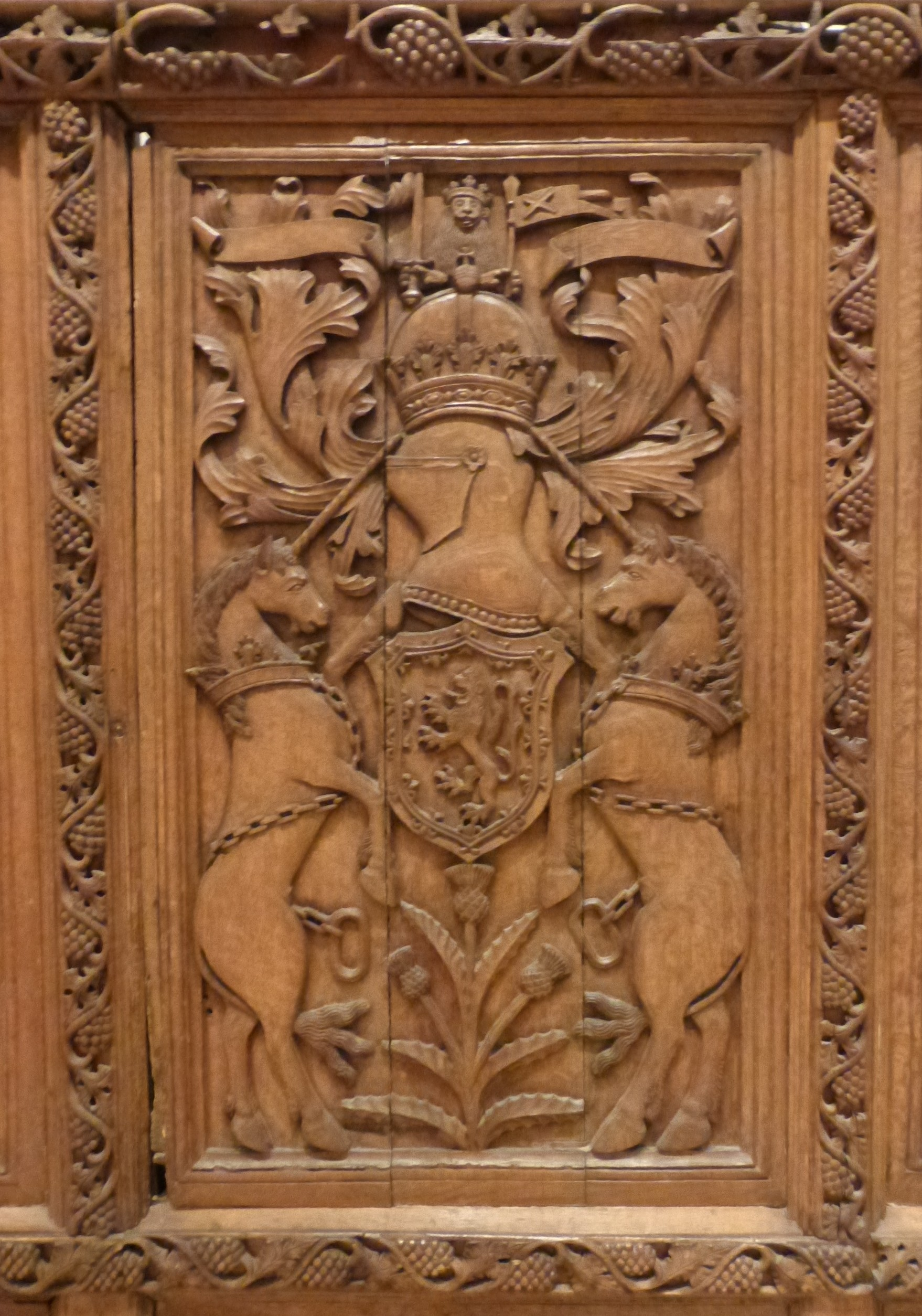
Scottish Royal Arms panel from St. Andrews Castle, seat of Cardinal David Beaton, Keeper of the Privy Seal in 1542

The office of Keeper of the Privy Seal of Scotland, one of the Great Officers of State, first appears in the reign of David II. After the Act of Union 1707 its holder was normally a peer, like the Keeper of the Great Seal. The office has remained unfilled since the death of Gavin Campbell, 1st Marquess of Breadalbane in 1922.

Section 3 of the Public Offices (Scotland) Act 1817 limited the salary for the office to a maximum of £1,200 per annum. The salary was paid out of the fees charged for instruments passing the Privy Seal, after the salary of the Deputy Keeper had been paid.

== Keepers of the Privy Seal of Scotland ==
- 1371: Sir John Lyon
- ?
- 1424: Walter Foote, Provost of Bothwell
- 1426: John Cameron, Provost of Lincluden, Bishop of Glasgow
- 1432: William Foulis, Provost of Bothwell
- 1442: William Turnbull, canon of Glasgow
- 1458: Thomas Spens, Bishop of Galloway
- 1459: John Arouse
- 1463: James Lindsay, Provost of Lincluden
- 1467: Thomas Spens (again), Bishop of Aberdeen
- 1470: William Tulloch, Bishop of Orkney, later of Moray
- 1482: Andrew Stewart, Bishop of Moray and half-brother to James III
- 1483: David Livingston, Provost of Lincluden
- 1489: John, Prior of St Andrews
- 1500: William Elphinstone, Bishop of Aberdeen
- 1507: Alexander Gordon, Bishop of Aberdeen
- 1514: David, Abbot of Arbroath
- 1519: George Crichton, Abbot of Holyrood and from 1526 the Bishop of Dunkeld
- ????: Robert Colvill, of Crawford
- 1542: David Beaton, Abbot of Arbroath, Cardinal Archbishop of St Andrews
- 1542: John Hamilton, Abbot of Paisley, later Archbishop of St Andrews
- 1547: William Ruthven, 2nd Lord Ruthven
- 1533: Alexander Seton, 1st Lord Fyvie
- 1563: Sir Richard Maitland, of Lethington
- 1567: John Maitland, Prior of Coldingham
- 1571: George Buchanan
- 1581: John Maitland, Prior of Coldingham
- 1583: Walter Stewart, commendator of Blantyre
- 1595: Sir Richard Cockburn of Clerkington
- 1626: Thomas Hamilton, 1st Earl of Melrose, later 1st Earl of Haddington
- 1641: Robert Ker, 1st Earl of Roxburghe
- 1649: John Gordon, 14th Earl of Sutherland (appointed by the Parliament)
- 1660: William Keith, 7th Earl Marischal
- 1661: Charles Seton, 2nd Earl of Dunfermline
- 1672: John Murray, 2nd Earl of Atholl, later 1st Marquess of Atholl
- 1689: Archibald Douglas, 1st Earl of Forfar
- 1689: John Keith, 1st Earl of Kintore
- 1689: John Carmichael, 2nd Lord Carmichael
- 1690: George Melville, 1st Earl of Melville
- 1695: James Douglas, 2nd Duke of Queensberry
- 1702: John Murray, 2nd Marquess of Atholl, later 1st Duke of Atholl
- 1705: James Douglas, 2nd Duke of Queensberry
- 1709: James Graham, 1st Duke of Montrose
- 1713: John Murray, 1st Duke of Atholl
- 1714: John Ker, 1st Duke of Roxburghe
- 1715: William Johnston, 1st Marquess of Annandale
- 1721: Archibald Campbell, 1st Earl of Ilay
- 1733: James Murray, 2nd Duke of Atholl
- 1763: James Stuart-Mackenzie
- 1765: Lord Frederick Campbell
- 1765: John Campbell, 3rd Earl of Breadalbane and Holland
- 1766: James Stuart-Mackenzie
- 1800: Henry Dundas, later 1st Viscount Melville
- 1811: Robert Saunders Dundas, 2nd Viscount Melville
- 1851: vacant
- 1853: Fox Maule Ramsay, 2nd Baron Panmure, later 11th Earl of Dalhousie
- 1874: Schomberg Henry Kerr, 9th Marquess of Lothian
- 1900: Ronald Ruthven Leslie-Melville, 11th Earl of Leven
- 1907: Gavin Campbell, 1st Marquess of Breadalbane
- 1922: vacant

== Sources ==
- J. Haydn, The Book of Dignities, 1894
- François Velde, in thread "Keepers of the Privy Seal of Scotland, 1874–1907", newsgroup alt.talk.royalty, 26 April 2005

== See also ==
- Keeper of the seals
- Lord Privy Seal
