= John Murray, 1st Marquess of Atholl =

Scottish judge

Portrait of Atholl

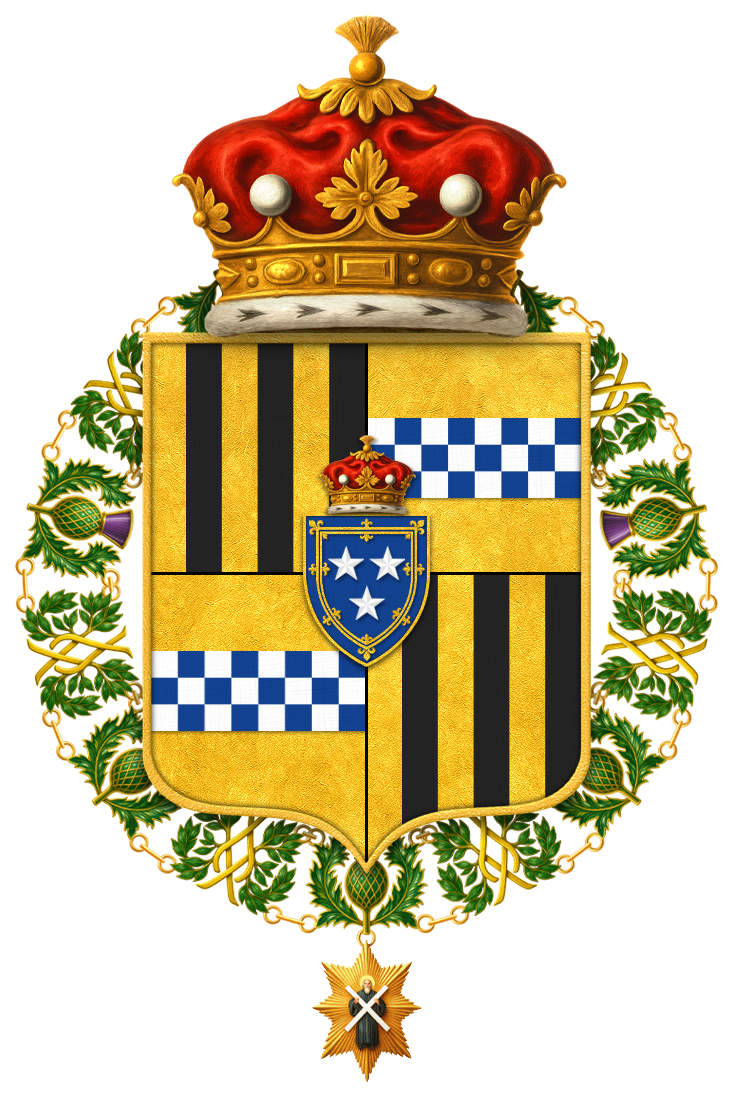
Atholl's coat of arms

John Murray, 1st Marquess of Atholl, KT (2 May 1631 – 6 May 1703) was a leading Scottish royalist and defender of the Stuarts during the English Civil War of the 1640s, until after the rise to power of William and Mary in 1689. He succeeded as 2nd Earl of Atholl on his father's demise in June 1642 and as 3rd Earl of Tullibardine after the death of his first cousin the 2nd Earl in 1670.

== Early life ==
Murray was the son of John Murray, 1st Earl of Atholl (cr. 1629) by his wife Jane, daughter of Duncan Campbell of Glenorchy. In 1650 he joined in the unsuccessful attempt to liberate Charles II from the Covenanters, and he was, in 1653, a chief supporter of the 9th Earl of Glencairn's rising to power in opposition to English plans to incorporate Scotland into the Commonwealth and devoted 2,000 men to the battle. He was eventually obliged to surrender the following year to George Monck, the victorious Commonwealth commander.

== Appointments ==
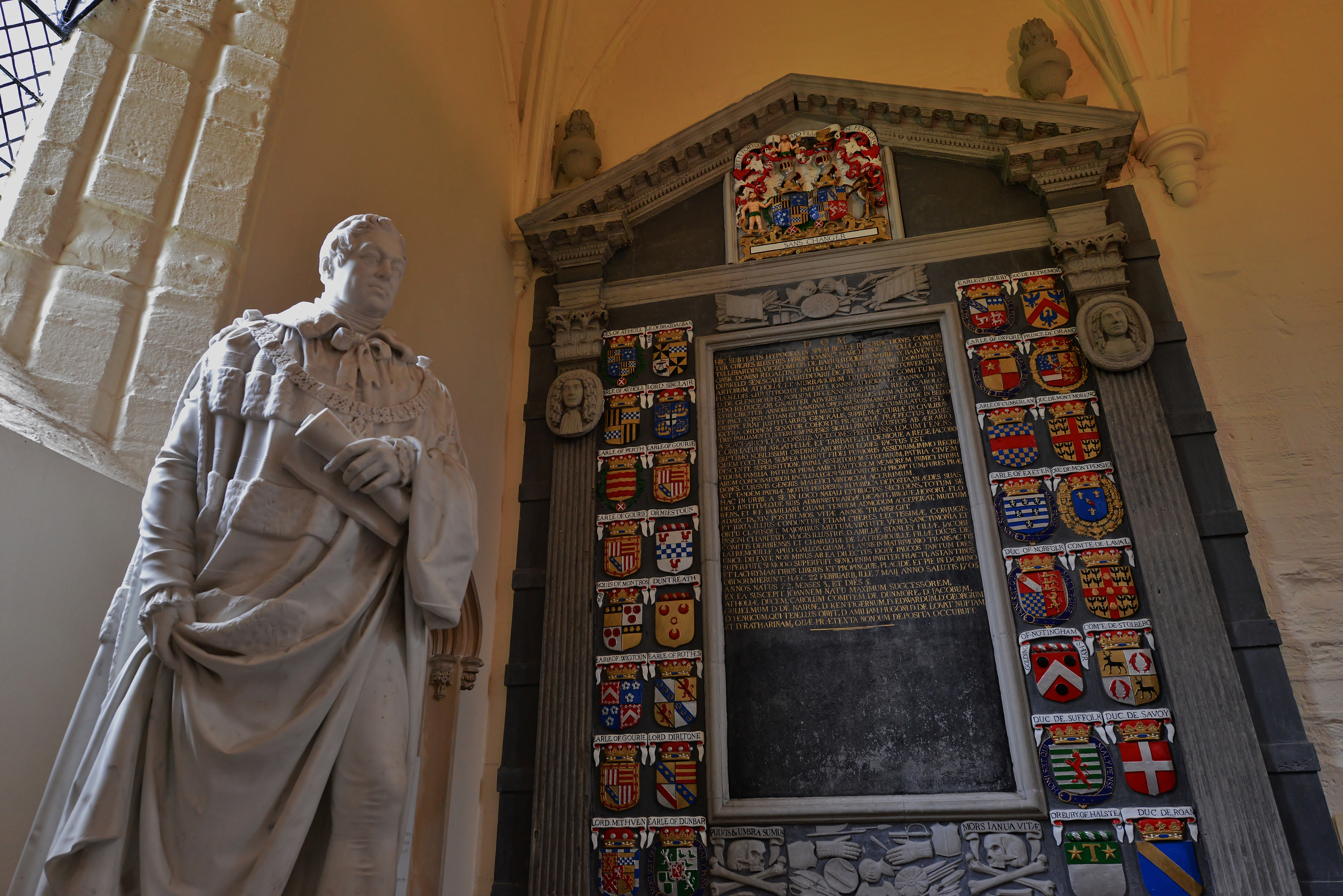
Heraldic monument to John Murray, 1st Marquess of Atholl, Dunkeld Cathedral, Scotland

In 1660, Murray became a privy councillor for Scotland, obtained a charter of the hereditary office of sheriff of Fife, and in 1661 became Lord Justice-General of Scotland. In 1663 he was appointed Lord President of the Court of Session. Murray became the first captain-general of the Royal Company of Archers in 1670. in 1671 he became a Commissioner of the Exchequer, the following year Keeper of the Privy Seal of Scotland and on 14 January 1673 became an Extraordinary Lord of Session.

In 1670 he succeeded to the earldom of Tullibardine on the death of his cousin, the 4th Earl and was created Marquess of Atholl and Viscount Glenalmond on 7 February 1676.

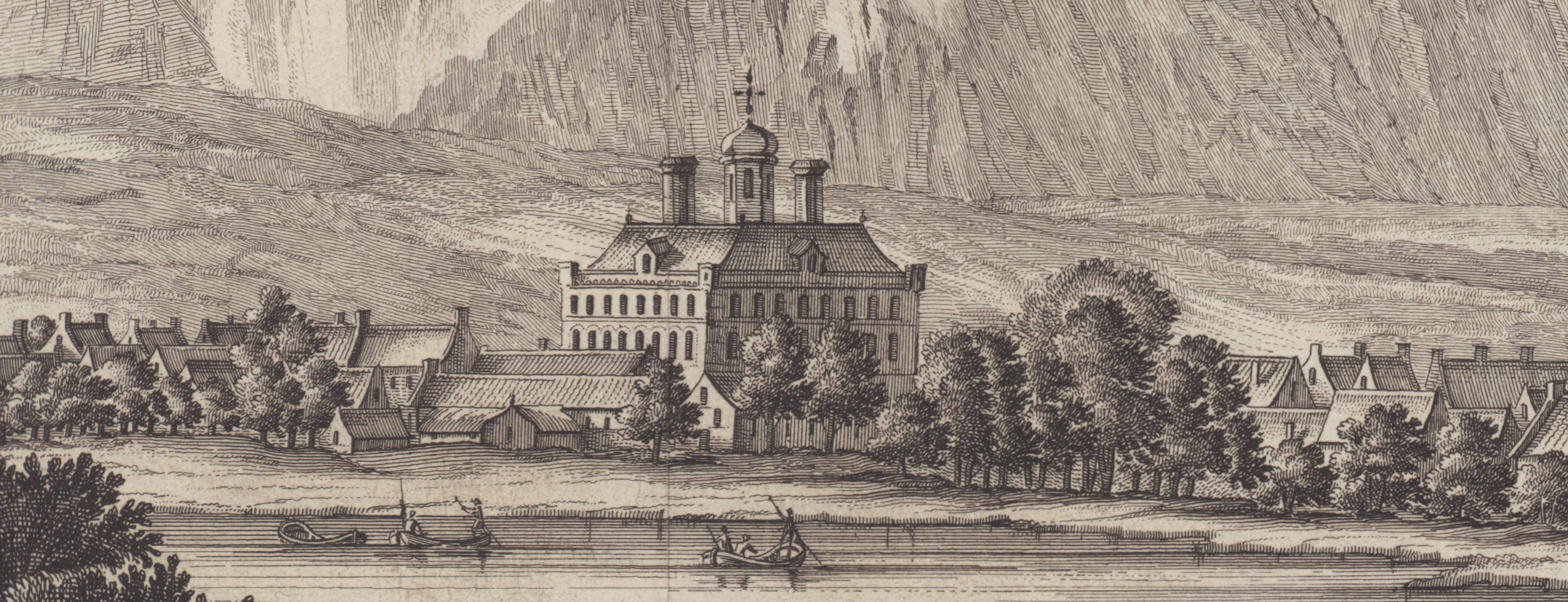
Old Dunkeld House, circa 1693

He commissioned William Bruce for a rebuild of Dunkeld House in 1676. The house had been badly damaged in 1654, during the civil war, and Bruce was given the task of building its replacement.

== Glorious Revolution ==
Murray was initially a supporter of the robust policies of Lord Lauderdale, taking part in a 1678 raid against the Covenanters, but he then temporarily lost royal favour by counselling moderation concerning the measures taken against them. In 1679, however, he was present at the Battle of Bothwell Bridge; in July 1680 he was made vice-admiral of Scotland, and in 1681 president of parliament.

In 1684 he was appointed lord-lieutenant of Argyll, fought vigorously against the 9th Earl of Argyll in Argyll's Rising of 1685 and was instrumental in defeating him. Murray was knighted in 1687.

He showed himself to be lukewarm to the accession of William III and waited on the event. Finally in April 1689 he wrote to William to declare his allegiance, and in May took part in the proclamation of William and Mary as king and queen at Edinburgh. But during Viscount Dundee's insurrection he allowed his troops to be used at the Battle of Killiecrankie against the supporters of the new king, which helped bring about the defeat of the government's troops. He was then summoned to London and imprisoned during August. In 1690 he was implicated in the Montgomery plot to restore James and subsequently in further Jacobite intrigues. In June 1691 he received a pardon, and acted later for the government in the pacification of the Highlands.

Ironically, given Murray's rumoured Jacobite leanings but public opposition to the group, his grandson, Lord George Murray became a famed general of the Jacobites and was responsible for their success throughout the greater part of the 1745 uprising.

Murray was described by Lord Macaulay as "the falsest, the most fickle, the most pusillanimous of mankind", regarding Murray's indecisive position surrounding the succession of William of Orange and the deposition of King James."

== Marriage ==
On 5 May 1659, Lord Atholl married Lady Amelia Ann Sophia Stanley (1633 – 22 February 1702/1703), daughter of James Stanley, 7th Earl of Derby and Charlotte de La Tremoille. They had twelve children, but four died young:

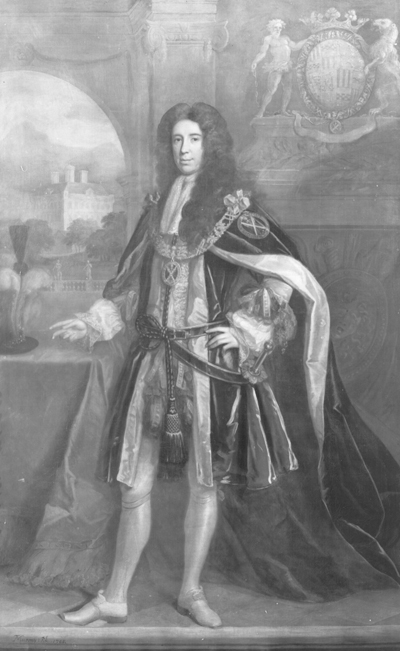
John Murray 1st Duke of Atholl 1660–1724

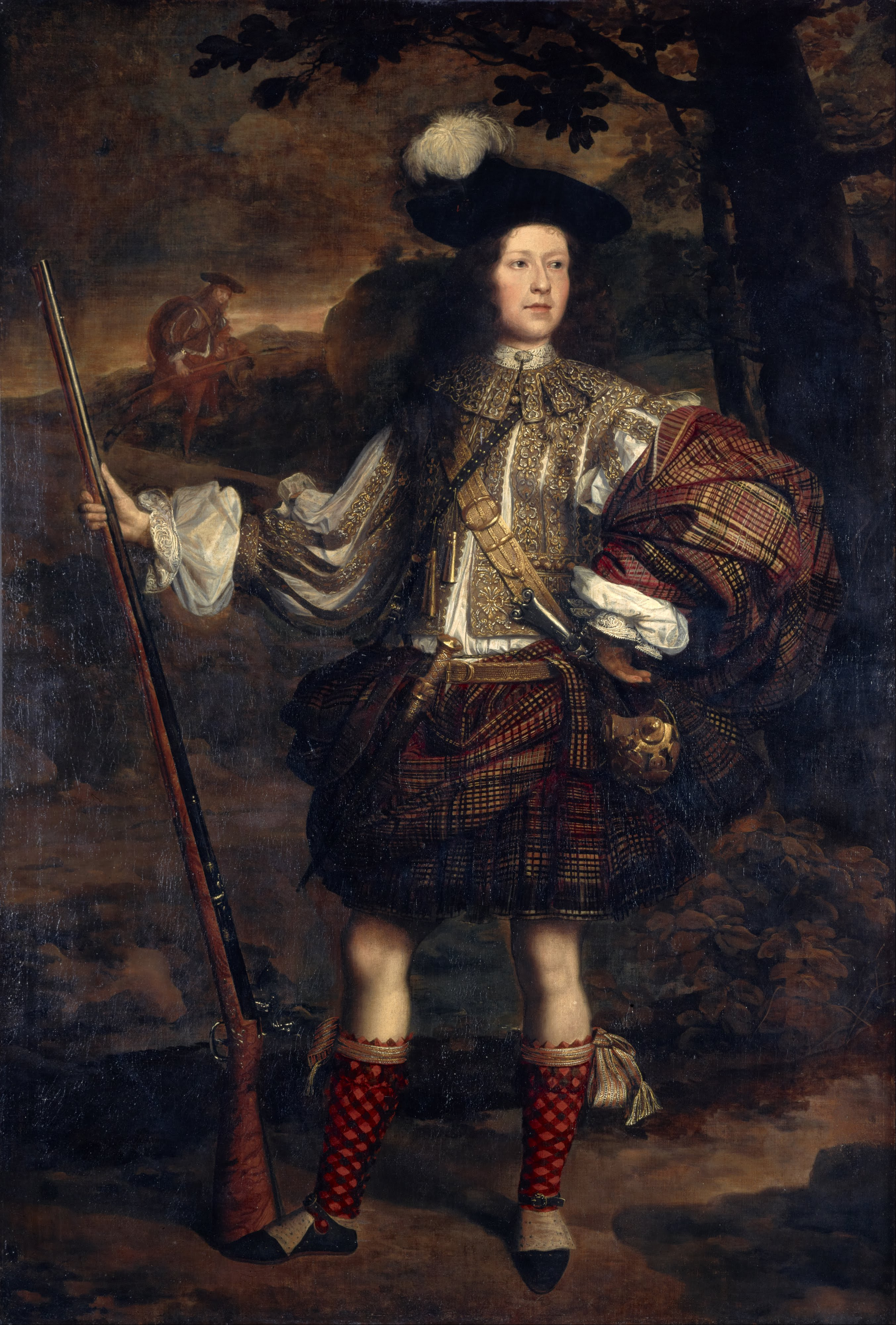
Lord Mungo Murray: died 1700 in Panama whilst establishing a Scottish plantation settlement there during the Darian expedition.

- John Murray, 1st Duke of Atholl (24 February 1660 – 14 November 1724), eldest son and heir, married (1) Lady Katherine Douglas-Hamilton, (2) Lady Mary Ross.
- Charles Murray, 1st Earl of Dunmore (24 February 1661 – 19 April 1710), married Catherine Watts.
- Lord James Murray (8 May 1663 – 30 December 1719), married Anne Murray of Glenmuir.
- William Murray, 2nd Lord Nairne (1664 – 3 February 1726), married Margaret Nairne. Their daughter Margaret Murray (died 28 May 1773) married in 1712 William Drummond, 4th Viscount Strathallan.
- Lady Charlotte Murray (1663–1735), married Thomas Cooper. No issue.
- Lady Amelia Murray (1666–1743), married 1. Hugh Fraser, 9th Lord Lovat; 2. Simon Fraser of Beaufort.
- Lady Jane Murray (1666–1670), died young.
- Sir Mungo Murray, Bt. (1668–1700), Scotland; Killed in Panama 1700, fighting the Spanish. Married Rachel Beaverich; son David married Margaret Donald; two daughters, including Catherine.
- Lord Edward Murray (1669–1743), married Katherine Skene.
- Lord Henry Murray (born 1670), died young.
- Lady Katherine Murray (1672–1689), died young.
- Lord George Murray (1673–1691), died young.

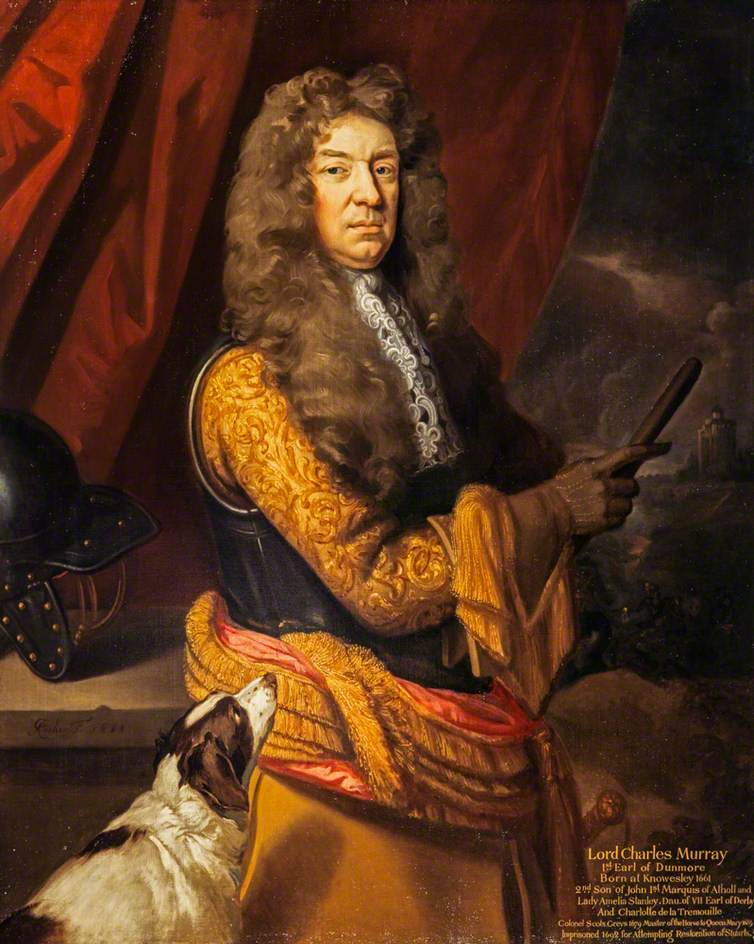
1st Earl of Dunmore: Charles Murray 1661–1710 portrait 1701 circa.

Prior to his marriage with Amelia Sophia Stanley, one "natural son" was born c. 1658 to Janett Mannachie from Dunkeld Perthshire. This son's name is unknown; however he is stated to have been apprenticed to an Edinburgh Lawyer (Writer) by the name of Louefoote (Lightfoot?). According to correspondence from the above-mentioned Lord Edward Murray born 1669 and reproduced in the Atholl Chronicles – dated 25 March 1735 addressed to his nephew John 1st Duke of Athol, this son died of smallpox c. 1680–1690.

The same source records twins Jane and "Male" Murray born c. 1676 in Castle Tullibardine, Perthshire and lived in France. Their mother was Ms Richards a "companion" of Amelia Sophia Stanley, who married: 1. Captain Anderson (Navy); 2. Mr Ongolling; 3. James Mazel.

Also possibly:

- William Murray c. 1658–1725, remained in Scotland and married Mary Vans; son William Vans Murray died 1763 in Maryland.

== See also ==
- Cromwell's Act of Grace

== Notes ==
Political offices
| Preceded by The Earl of Dunfermline | Keeper of the Privy Seal of Scotland; 1672–1689 | Succeeded by The Earl of Forfar |
Military offices
| Preceded by The Earl of Newburgh | Captain and Colonel of the Scots Troop of Horse Guards; 1671–1678 | Succeeded by The Marquess of Montrose |
Peerage of Scotland
| New creation | Marquess of Atholl; 1676–1703 | Succeeded by John Murray |
| Preceded by John Murray | Earl of Atholl; 1642–1703 | Succeeded by John Murray |
| Preceded by James Murray | Earl of Tullibardine; 1670–1703 | Succeeded by John Murray |
