= Battle of Preston (1715) =

Final action of the Jacobite rising of 1715

- Part of the Jacobite rising of 1715
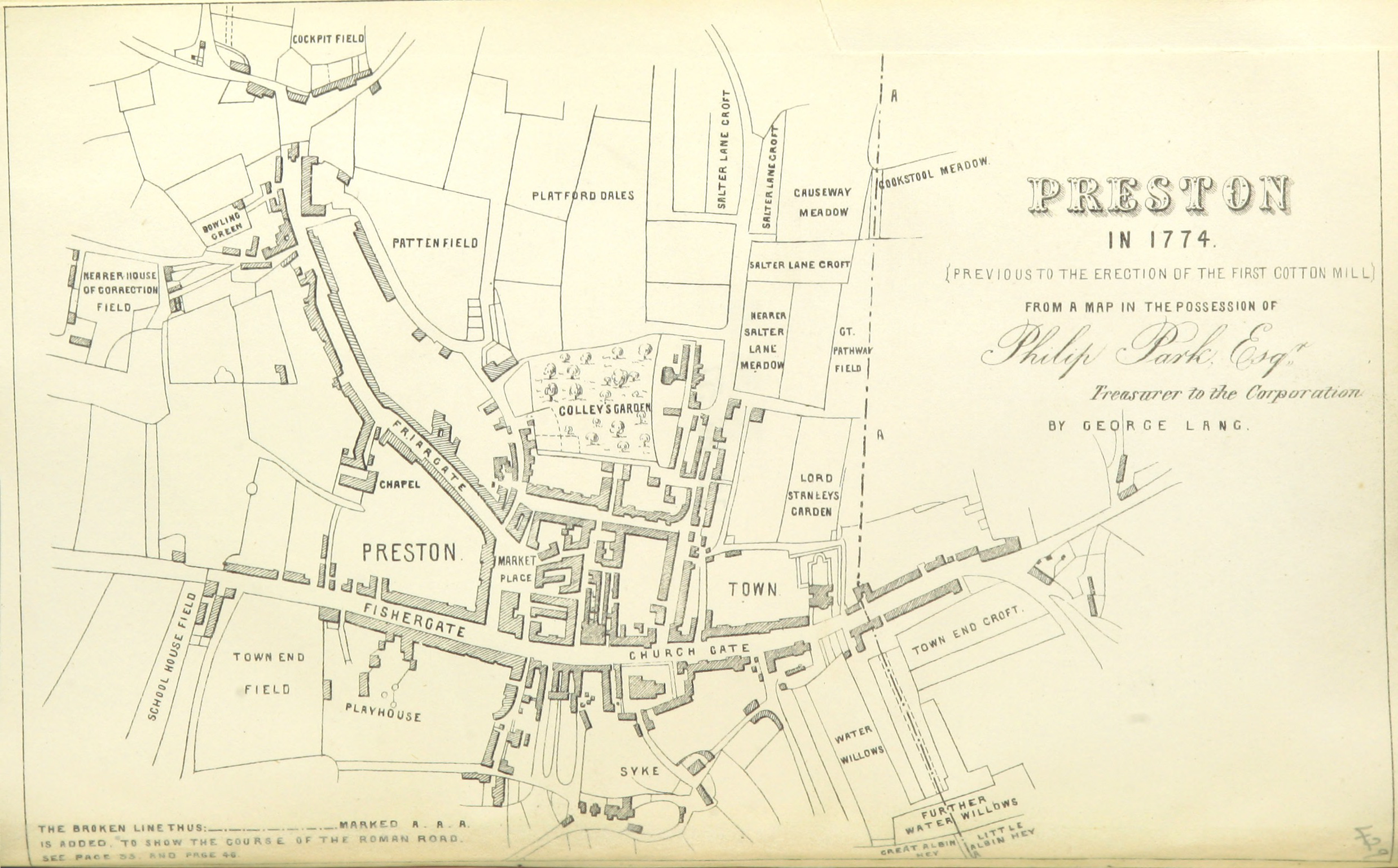
- A map of 18th-century Preston
Date	9–14 November 1715
Location	Preston, Lancashire 53.754°N 2.701°W
Result	Government victory

Belligerents
(Kingdom of Great Britain) Great Britain	Jacobites

Commanders and leaders
(Kingdom of Great Britain) Charles Wills (Kingdom of Great Britain) George Carpenter	William Mackintosh; William Maxwell; Lord Derwentwater; Thomas Forster; Henry Oxburgh

Strength
2,500–3,000	1,700

Casualties and losses
300 killed or wounded	17 dead 25 wounded 1,468 captured
- Location within England

The Battle of Preston (9–14 November 1715) was the final action of the Jacobite rising of 1715, an attempt to put James Francis Edward Stuart on the British throne in place of George I. After two days of street-fighting, the Jacobite commander Thomas Forster surrendered to government troops under General Charles Wills. It was arguably the last battle fought on English soil.

== Background ==
The Jacobites moved south into England with little opposition, and by the time they reached Preston, Lancashire had grown to about 4,000 in number. Their cavalry entered Preston on the night of 9 November 1715, and as they approached two troops of dragoons and part of a militia regiment retreated to Wigan.

General Charles Wills was ordered to halt their advance, and left Manchester on 11 November with six regiments, arriving on 12 November. The Jacobite leader was Thomas Forster, a Northumberland squire with minimal military experience, selected largely because he was a Protestant; learning of Wills' approach, he decided to stay and made the mistake of withdrawing troops from a strong defensive position at Ribble bridge (Walton Bridge), 0.5 miles (0.8 km) outside Preston.

== Battle ==
The Jacobites had barricaded the principal streets of Preston, and Wills ordered an immediate attack, which met with fire from the barricades and from houses, resulting in the Hanoverian attack being repulsed with heavy losses. Wills then had houses set on fire, with the aim of fires spreading along to the Jacobite positions, and the Jacobites tried to do the same to houses taken as government positions. At night, Wills's order to light the government-held positions for identification helped the Jacobite snipers, but overnight many Jacobites left the town. The legend of these actions is recounted in a well-known Lancashire ballad, Lo! The Bird is Fallen.

On 13 November, additional government forces arrived from Newcastle under George Carpenter, which Wills deployed to ensure the besieged Jacobites could not escape. Although casualties were relatively low, their position was hopeless, and Forster was advised by his subordinate Henry Oxburgh to open negotiations with Wills for surrender on terms. The Scots were not informed and on learning of this they paraded through the streets, threatening any Jacobites who might even allude to a surrender, killing or wounding several people. At 7:00 am on Monday 14 November, Forster offered an unconditional surrender, which Wills rejected unless it also applied to the Scots; after some discussion, they confirmed they would surrender on the same terms.

== Aftermath ==
1,468 Jacobites were taken prisoner, 463 of them English. George Seton, 5th Earl of Winton, William Gordon, 6th Viscount of Kenmure, William Maxwell, 5th Earl of Nithsdale, James Radclyffe, 3rd Earl of Derwentwater, William Murray, 2nd Lord Nairne, and John Nairne were among those captured and later sentenced to be executed for treason under an act of attainder. However, Winton and Nithsdale escaped from the Tower of London. In May 1716 Colonel Oxburgh was hanged, drawn and quartered at Tyburn for his part in the rising. All surviving prisoners except for members of the Clan Gregor were later pardoned by the Indemnity Act 1717.

Seventeen Jacobites were killed and twenty-five wounded. Government casualties were close to 300 killed and wounded. Of the ordinary Highland clansmen captured at the Battle of Preston, many were transported to the Americas.

== Last battle on English soil ==
The battle of Preston is often claimed to have been the last fought on English soil, but this depends on the definition of "battle", for which there are different interpretations. Preston was a siege rather than a pitched battle, so the Battle of Sedgemoor fought in 1685 is also a contender for the title of the last battle, as is the skirmish at Clifton Moor near Penrith in Cumbria on 18 December 1745 during the 'Forty-Five' Jacobite rebellion. However, there was a great deal of savage fighting in streets all over the town during the Battle of Preston, far more than in most sieges. It was as much of a battle as, for example, the Battle of St Albans (1455) in the Wars of the Roses, which was also fought in the streets of a town, but which is generally regarded as a battle and not a siege, as is the Battle of Reading of 1688. The Battle of Bossenden Wood, fought on 31 May 1838, is a much later contender.

== See also ==
- Battle of Sheriffmuir, a concurrent battle of the 1715 Rising fought in Scotland

== Sources ==
- Baynes, J. (1970). The Jacobite Rising of 1715. pp. 126–127.
- Lenman, Bruce (1980). The Jacobite Risings in Britain, 1689-1746. Methuen. ISBN 0413396509.
