= Indemnity Act 1717 =

Act of the Parliament of Great Britain

General Pardon Act 1716
- Act of Parliament
- Parliament of Great Britain
- Long title: An act for the King's most gracious, general and free pardon.
- Citation: 3 Geo. 1. c. 19
- Territorial extent: Great Britain

Dates
- Royal assent: 15 July 1717
- Commencement: 20 February 1717 (Note: Start of session.)
- Repealed: 15 July 1867
Other legislation
| Repealed by | Statute Law Revision Act 1867 |

Status: Repealed

Text of statute as originally enacted

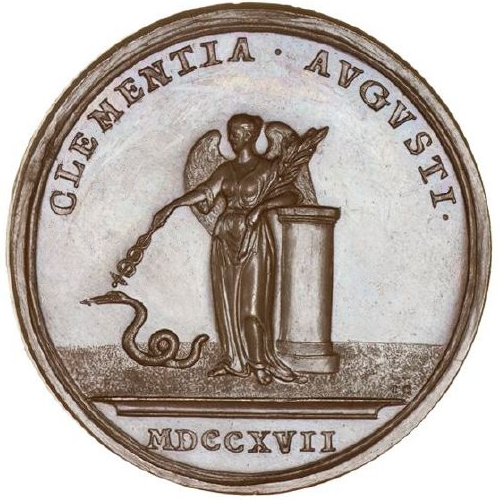
John Croker's medal to mark the Act, dated 1717

The Indemnity Act 1717 (3 Geo. 1. c. 19, also referred to as the Act of Grace and Free Pardon, was an act of the Parliament of Great Britain.

The act was passed by both houses of parliament in July 1717, the last enactment of the session. It followed almost two years after the Jacobite rising of 1715, during and after which many Jacobites were taken prisoner. Those later convicted of treason were condemned to death, and some were executed, but by the Act most of the surviving Jacobite prisoners were freed and were permitted to settle either at home or overseas.

Hundreds of Jacobites were freed by the act. The more notable included the Earl of Carnwath, Lord Nairne, and Lord Widdrington, together with seventeen gentlemen awaiting execution in the Newgate and twenty-six in Carlisle Castle. Some two hundred men captured at the Battle of Preston were released at Chester, also all remaining prisoners held in the castles of Edinburgh and Stirling. The Act did not undo the effect of any attainders, and confiscated estates worth £48,000 a year in England and £30,000 a year in Scotland; the dispossessed owners were not restored of their property.

There were some specific exceptions to the general pardon granted by the act: Matthew Prior and Robert Harley, 1st Earl of Oxford, had been held in the Tower of London before the Rising of 1715, and Oxford's friend Lord Harcourt and his cousin Thomas Harley. All members of the Clan MacGregor were also excluded from the Act's benefits, one of the targets of this last exclusion being the famous Rob Roy MacGregor. Philip Henry Stanhope noted in the 1840s that "a modern reader is shocked to find excepted 'all and every person of the name and clan of Macgregor'".

The passage of the act was marked by the issuing of a silver medal, also struck in bronze, engraved by John Croker, chief engraver to the Royal Mint. On the obverse is the head of King George I, on the reverse is the winged figure of Clemency, who is standing, but leaning by her left elbow on a short stone pillar, surrounded by the words "CLEMENTIA AVGVSTI". In her left hand is an olive branch, while in her outstretched right hand she holds a caduceus, with which she touches the head of a fleeing snake, representing Rebellion. This image recalls the story of the caduceus of Mercury.

== Subsequent developments ==
The whole act was repealed by section 1 of, and the schedule to, the Statute Law Revision Act 1867 (30 & 31 Vict. c. 59), which came into force on 15 July 1867.
