= John Murray, 1st Duke of Atholl =

Scottish politician and military officer (1660–1724)

His Grace The Duke of Atholl KT PC
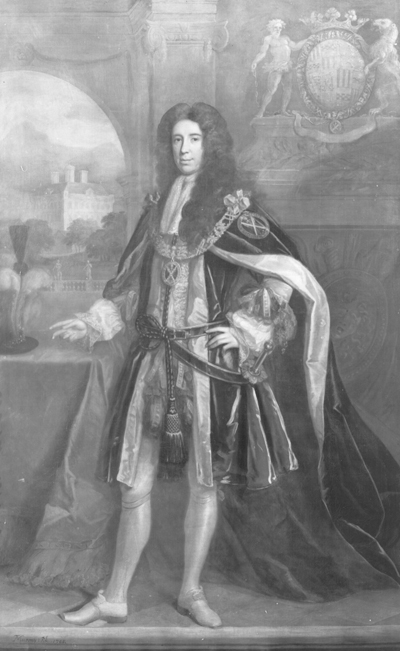

Keeper of the Privy Seal of Scotland
- In office 1702–1705
- Monarch: Anne
- Preceded by: The Marquess of Tweeddale
- Succeeded by: The Duke of Queensberry

Chancellor of the University of St Andrews
- In office 1697–1724
- Preceded by: Arthur Ross, Archbishop of St Andrews
- Succeeded by: James Brydges, 1st Duke of Chandos

Personal details
- Born: 24 February 1660 Knowsley Hall, Lancashire, England
- Died: 14 November 1724 (aged 64) Huntingtower Castle, Perthshire, Scotland
- Spouse(s): Lady Catherine Hamilton; Mary Ross
- Children: 21, including William, James, George, and John
- Parent(s): John Murray, 1st Marquess of Atholl (father); Lady Amelia Sophia Stanley (mother)

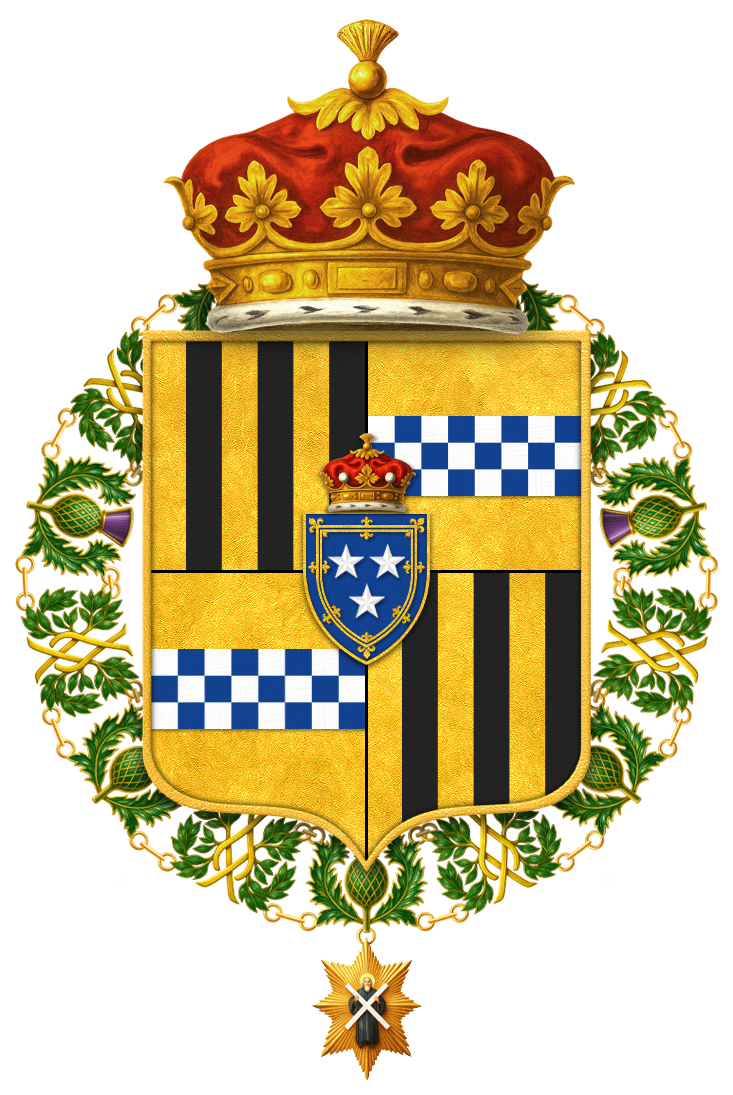
Shield of arms of John Murray, 1st Duke of Atholl, KT, PC

John Murray, 1st Duke of Atholl, KT, PC (24 February 1660 – 14 November 1724) was a Scottish politician and military officer. He served in numerous positions during his life, and fought in the Glorious Revolution for William III and Mary II.

== Early life and family ==
Murray was born in 1660 at Knowsley Hall, Lancashire, England to John Murray, 1st Marquess of Atholl and his wife, the former Lady Amelia Sophia Stanley. Murray's maternal grandparents were the 7th Earl of Derby and Charlotte de La Trémoille. He was the first of twelve children and matriculated from University of St Andrews in 1676. He was married twice and was the father of 21 children.

== Later life and career ==
He was created 1st Earl of Tullibardine by William III in 1696 and was created the 1st Duke of Atholl by Queen Anne in 1703.

Lord Murray was a supporter of King William III during the Glorious Revolution, taking the oath of loyalty in September 1689, but was unable to prevent some of his clan from joining Lord Dundee under the command of his father's baillie, Stewart of Ballechin. Lord Murray laid siege to his family's ancestral home, Blair Castle, which Ballechin had fortified and held for King James II but ended the siege just days prior to the Battle of Killiecrankie.

In 1683 he married Lady Catherine Hamilton, daughter of Anne Hamilton, 3rd Duchess of Hamilton and her husband William Hamilton, Duke of Hamilton, with whom he had six daughters and seven sons; only six of their children survived into adulthood.

In 1693 he was appointed as one of the commissioners to the inquiry into the massacre of Glencoe. In 1695, Lord Murray was made Sheriff of Perth. In 1696 the earldom of Tullibardine was created for him, from whence he was known as the Earl of Tullibardine. Also in 1696, he became Secretary of State, and from 1696 to 1698 was Lord High Commissioner to the Parliament of Scotland. With the accession of Queen Anne in 1702, he was made a Privy Councillor, and in 1703 became Keeper of the Privy Seal of Scotland. The same year he succeeded his father as 2nd Marquess of Atholl, and in June 1703 he was created Duke of Atholl, Marquess of Tullibardine, Earl of Strathtay and Strathardle, Viscount of Balquhidder, Glenalmond and Glenlyon, and Lord Murray, Balvenie and Gask.

In 1704, Murray succeeded his father as a Knight of the Thistle. In 1704 an unsuccessful attempt was made by Lord Lovat, who used the Duke of Queensberry as a tool to implicate him in a Jacobite plot against Queen Anne. The intrigue was disclosed by Robert Ferguson, and Atholl sent a memorial to the Queen on the subject, which resulted in Queensberry's downfall. But the affair had a damaging effect on Murray's career, and he was deprived of office in October 1704. He subsequently became a strong antagonist of the government, and of the Hanoverian succession. He vehemently opposed Union during the years 1705–1707, and entered into a project which would have resisted the Crown by force by holding Stirling Castle with the aid of the Cameronians but this plan was never followed. After the vote for Union, he accepted compensation of £1,000 for back pay from services owed him (although in Lord Polwarth's memoirs the monies were not a 'bribe' as has been suggested by the Jacobite Sir George Lockhart of Carnwath, but remuneration owed him since 1698 for service to the Crown). On the occasion, however, of the planned invasion of 1708 he took no part, on account of illness, and was placed under arrest at Blair Castle.

Murray was a founder of the Society in Scotland for Propagating Christian Knowledge (SSPCK) in Edinburgh in 1709. He supported the Society in its establishment of the first schools in Blair Atholl and Balquhidder, but did not share its antipathy to the Gaelic language.

With the downfall of the Whigs and the advent of the Tories to power, Murray returned to favour and to office. He was chosen a Scottish representative peer in the House of Lords in 1710 and in 1712 was restored to his position as High Commissioner and Keeper of the Privy Seal. In the same year he was appointed Lord High Commissioner to the General Assembly of the Church of Scotland, attending the Assembly on behalf of the sovereign.

With the accession of King George I he was again dismissed from office. Three of his sons joined the Jacobites in the rebellion of 1715, including his eldest living son, William, Lord Tullibardine. Tullibardine was subsequently attainted and removed from succession to the title, but Murray himself remained loyal to the Crown. In June 1717 he apprehended Rob Roy MacGregor, who, however, succeeded in escaping.

Atholl died in 1724, and was succeeded by his second surviving son James.

== Children ==
By his first wife Lady Catherine, daughter of William Hamilton, Duke of Hamilton and Anne Hamilton, 3rd Duchess of Hamilton, he had the following thirteen children:

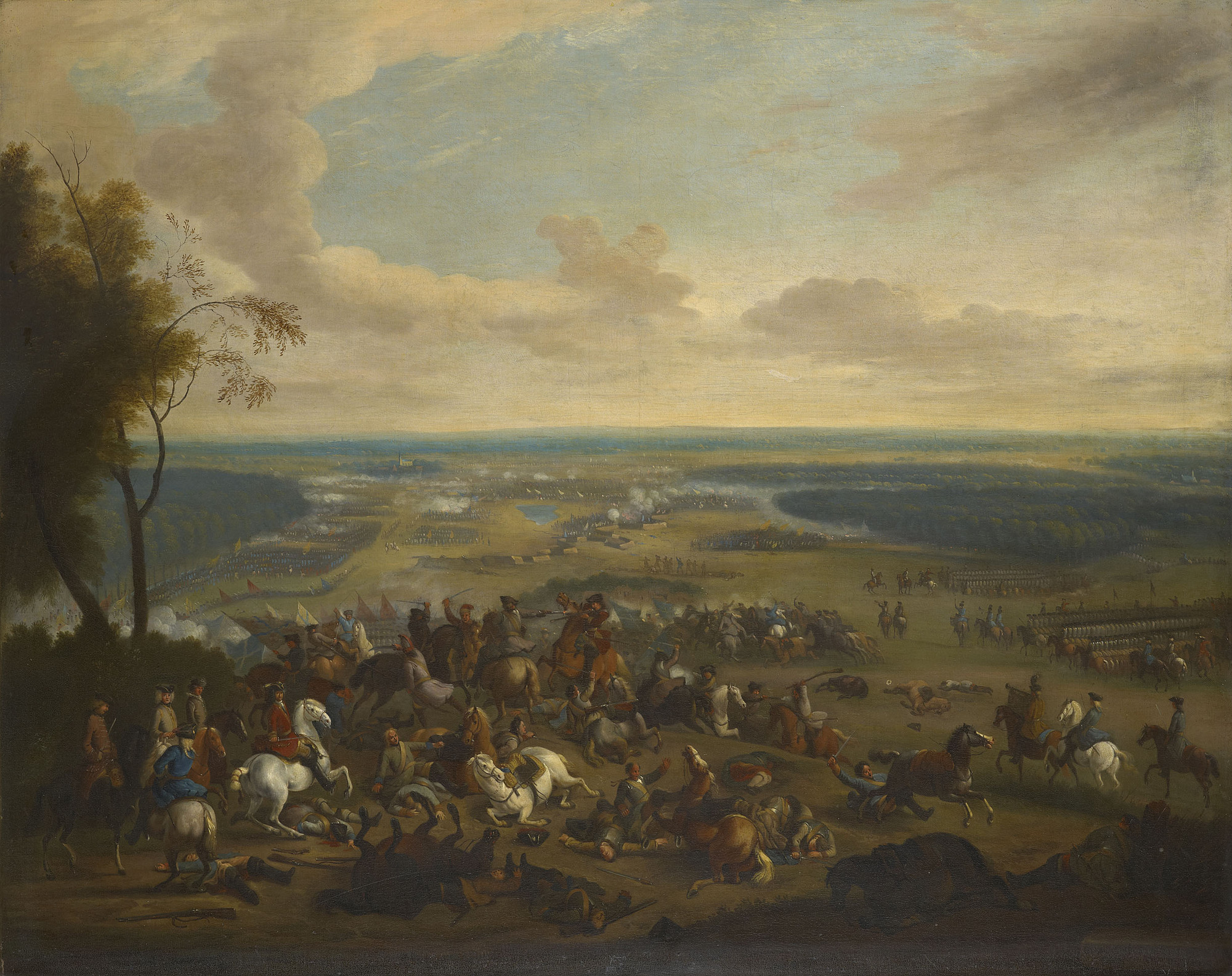
Eldest son John Murray, Marquis of Tullibardine died at the Battle of Malplaquet, in 1709

- John Murray, Marquess of Tullibardine (6 May 1684 – 11 September 1709), killed during the Battle of Malplaquet
- Lady Anne Murray (21 May 1685 – 20 July 1686)
- Lady Mary Murray (28 September 1686 – 6 January 1689)
- William Murray, Marquess of Tullibardine (14 April 1689 – 9 July 1746), attainted and removed from the succession
- James Murray, 2nd Duke of Atholl (28 September 1690 – 8 January 1764)
- Lord Charles Murray (24 September 1691 – 28 August 1720)
- Lady Katherine Murray (28 October 1692 – 5 November 1692)
- Lord George Murray (23 August 1693 – 25 August 1693)
- Lord George Murray (4 October 1694 – 11 October 1760)

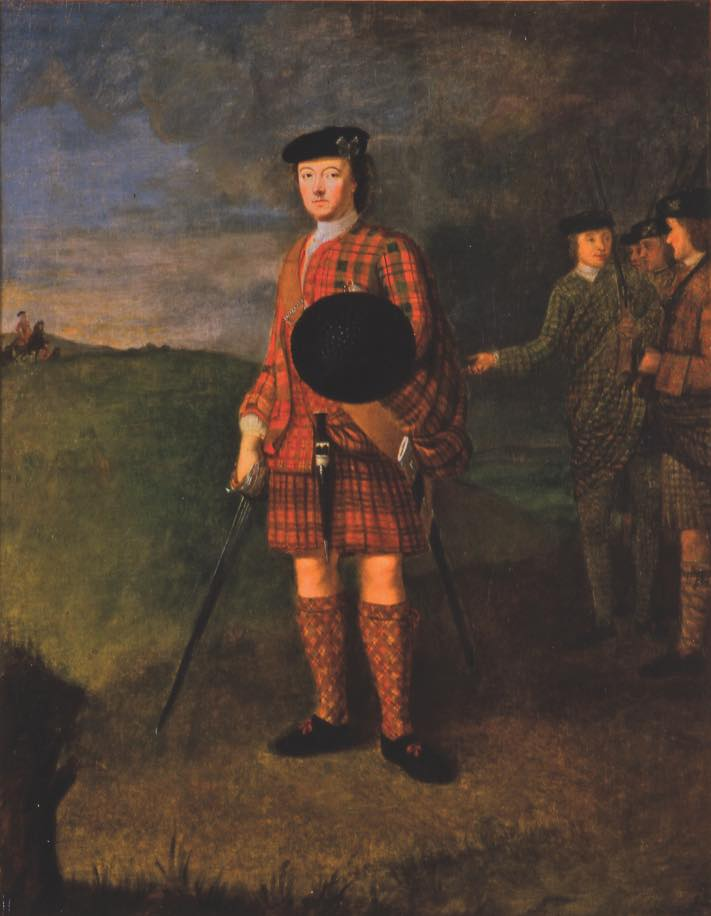
Lord George Murray, died in exile in Holland

- Lady Susan Murray (15 April 1699 – 22 June 1725), married William Gordon, 2nd Earl of Aberdeen
- Lady Katherine Murray (25 April 1702 – 1710)
- Lord Basil Murray (29 December 1704 – February 1712); several children in the Dunkeld area were named "Basil" after him

By his second wife Mary Ross, daughter of William Ross, 12th Lord Ross and Agnes Wilkie. They had the following eight children:

- General Lord John Murray (14 April 1711 – 26 May 1787)
- Lord Mungo Murray (August 1712 – June 1714)
- Lord Edward Murray (9 June 1714 – 2 February 1737)
- Lord Frederick Murray (8 January 1716 – April 1743)
- Lady Wilhelmina Caroline Murray (28 May 1718 – May 1720)
- Lady Mary Murray (3 March 1720 – 29 December 1795)
- Lady Amelia Anne Murray (20 April 1721 – 26 April 1721)

== See also ==
- Duke of Atholl

== Notes ==
Parliament of Scotland
Preceded by The Marquess of Tweeddale	Lord High Commissioner; 1696–1700	Succeeded by The Duke of Queensberry
Political offices
Preceded by The Duke of Queensberry	Keeper of the Privy Seal of Scotland; 1702–1705	Succeeded by The Duke of Queensberry
Academic offices
Preceded by Arthur Ross; Archbishop of St Andrews	Chancellor of the University of St Andrews; 1697–1724	Succeeded by The Duke of Chandos
Peerage of Scotland
New creation	Duke of Atholl; June 1703 – 1724	Succeeded by James Murray
Preceded by John Murray	Marquess of Atholl; May 1703 – 1724	Succeeded by James Murray
Parliament of Great Britain
Preceded by The Earl of Crawford	Scottish representative peer 1710–1715	Succeeded by The Earl of Bute
