= Dunmore =

Dunmore from the Irish: Dún Mór or Scottish Gaelic: Dùn Mòr, meaning "great fort", may refer to:

== People ==
- Dunmore (surname)
- Earl of Dunmore, a title in the Peerage of Scotland, includes a list of earls
- Countess of Dunmore (disambiguation), a list of wives of earls of Dunmore

== Places ==
=== Australia ===
- Dunmore, New South Wales, a suburb of Shellharbour City
  - Dunmore railway station
- Dunmore, Queensland, a rural locality in the Toowoomba Region

=== Ireland ===
- Dunmore, County Galway, a town
- Dunmore, County Kilkenny, a civil parish in County Kilkenny
- Dunmore Cave, County Kilkenny
- Dunmore Head, in County kerry

=== United States ===
- Dunmore, Pennsylvania, a borough
- Dunmore County, former name of Shenandoah County, Virginia
- Dunmore, West Virginia, an unincorporated community
- Lake Dunmore, Vermont

=== Elsewhere ===
- Dunmore Town, Bahamas
- Dunmore, Alberta, Canada, a hamlet
- Dunmore, Falkirk, Scotland, a village

== Other uses ==
- Dunmore School District, Pennsylvania
- Dunmore High School, Pennsylvania
- Dunmore McHales GAC a Gaelic football club, Ireland
- Dunmore Stadium, a greyhound racing track in Belfast, Northern Ireland
- Dunmore v. Ontario (Attorney General), a Canadian constitutional case
- Dunmore (1891), a wooden-hulled steamship of the coastal trade in Australia

== See also ==
- Dunmore East, a village in County Waterford, Ireland
- Dunmor, Kentucky
- Dunsmore
