= Dinsmore (surname) =

Dinsmore is a surname with Scottish and Welsh origins. It is a toponymic surname derived from the lands of Dundemore in Northern Fife, Scotland with origins in the 12th century. Another surname derived from the same location is Dunmore. Other spelling variants include Densmore and Dunsmore.

An alternative origin says Dinsmore is a variant of the toponymic surname Dinmore. However, Dunsmore has also been reported to be a variant of Dinsmore. Another toponymic surname derivation is based on Dinmore, Herefordshire, England.

Dinsmor is the Welsh toponymic variant that derives from the Welsh and Cornish-British root den- for "fortress" or "fort" and from either the Gaelic root mor- meaning "great", "mighty" or "proud" or the Welsh root mawr- meaning "large" or "warrior", ultimately yielding "a great or large walled city or town" or "a great fortress".

The name Dinsmore may refer to:

- Bill Dinsmore (1887–1967), Australian football player
- Bruce Dinsmore (born 1965), Canadian actor
- Charles Dinsmore (1903–1982), Canadian ice hockey player
- David Dinsmore (born 1968), British newspaper editor
- Duke Dinsmore (1913–1985), American racecar driver
- Hugh A. Dinsmore (1850–1930), American politician
- James Dinsmore (1771–1830), Irish carpenter
- John Edward Dinsmore, (1862–1951) American Botanist and herbarium curator at the American Colony, Jerusalem
- Julia Stockton Dinsmore (1833–1926), American poet
- Nick Dinsmore (born 1975), American wrestler
- Ray P. Dinsmore (1893–1979), American scientist
- Robert Dinsmore Harrison (1897–1977), American politician
- Billie Mae Richards (born Billie Mae Dinsmore, 1921–2010), Canadian performer
