= Alexander Murray, 8th Earl of Dunmore =

British soldier

Major The Right Honourable The Earl of Dunmore VC DSO MVO DL
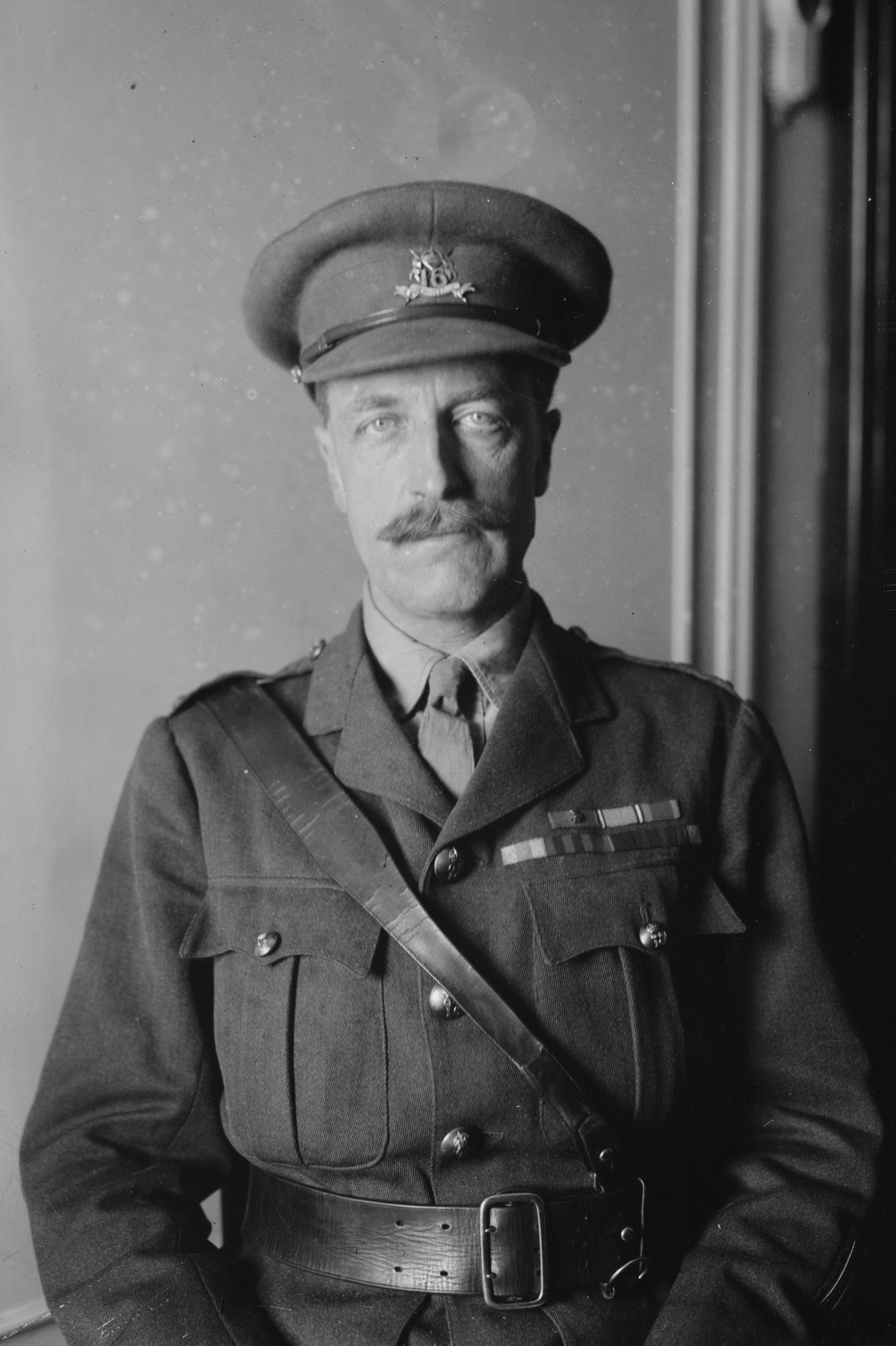
- Born: 22 April 1871; Portland Place, London, England
- Died: 29 January 1962 (aged 90); Sussex Place, London, England
- Burial place: Golders Green Crematorium
- Military career
- Allegiance: United Kingdom
- Branch: British Army
- Service years: 1892–1907; 1914–1918
- Rank: Major
- Units: 16th Lancers (The Queen's)
- Commands: 31st Battalion, Imperial Yeomanry
- Conflicts: Mahdist War; Tirah Campaign; Malakand Frontier War; Second Boer War; World War I
- Awards: Victoria Cross; Distinguished Service Order; Member of the Royal Victorian Order

Alexander Edward Murray, 8th Earl of Dunmore VC DSO MVO DL (22 April 1871 – 29 January 1962), known by the courtesy title Viscount Fincastle until 1907, was a Scottish peer, soldier and politician.

== Early life and colonial military career ==
Murray was born on 22 April 1871 to Charles Murray, 7th Earl of Dunmore and Lady Gertrude Coke, immediately taking the courtesy title of Viscount Fincastle. His grandparents included Alexander Murray, 6th Earl of Dunmore, Lady Catherine Herbert, Thomas Coke, 2nd Earl of Leicester, and Juliana Whitbread. His paternal great-grandmother was the Russian noblewoman Countess Catherine Woronzoff (or Vorontsova), daughter of the Russian ambassador to St James's, Semyon Romanovich Vorontsov. He was educated privately and at Eton before joining the army. On 30 May 1892, Murray was commissioned into the 16th Lancers and sent to India. Murray was aide-de-camp to Victor Bruce, 9th Earl of Elgin, Governor-General of India from 1895 to 1897. In 1896, he accompanied the Dongola Expedition to the Sudan and saw action in the Mahdist War.

=== Victoria Cross ===
In 1897, aged 26, while a lieutenant in the 16th Lancers, Murray returned to India also acting as a war correspondent for The Times. On 17 August 1897 at Nawa Kili, Upper Swat, British India, Lieutenant Murray with two other officers (Robert Bellew Adams and Hector Lachlan Stewart MacLean) and five men of the Guides, went under a heavy and close fire, to the rescue of a lieutenant of the Lancashire Fusiliers who was lying disabled by a bullet wound and surrounded by enemy swordsmen. While the wounded officer was being brought under cover, he was killed by a bullet. One of the officers of the rescue party was mortally wounded and four horses were shot. The message sent to their superiors read:

During the fighting at Nawa Bali, in Upper Swat, on the 17th August, 1897, Lieutenant-Colonel R. B. Adams proceeded with Lieutenants H. L. S. MacLean and Viscount Fincastle, and five men of the Guides, under a very heavy and close fire, to the rescue of Lieutenant R. T. Greaves, Lancashire Fusiliers, who was lying disabled by a bullet wound and surrounded by the enemy's swordsmen. In bringing him under cover he (Lieutenant Greaves) was struck by a bullet and killed — Lieutenant MacLean was mortally wounded — whilst the horses of Lieutenant-Colonel Adams and Lieutenant Viscount Fincastle were shot, as well as two troop horses.

Murray received the Victoria Cross for his actions, becoming the only journalist to be so honoured.

== Later political and military career ==
Murray's account of his colonial service was published in 1898. In 1899, Murray was posted to South Africa as aide-de-camp to General Sir H. C. Chermside in South Africa. He fought in the Second Boer War and was present at the Relief of Kimberley. In late 1901 he raised Fincastle's Horse (31st Battalion Imperial Yeomanry, comprising 139th–142nd and 177th Companies), and was appointed in command of the battalion with the temporary rank of Lieutenant-colonel 22 January 1902. The battalion numbered 32 officers and 603 men, recruited mainly from the Highlands. They left Edinburgh in April 1902 to embark the SS Galatea for South Africa, where they arrived the following month. The war in South Africa ended shortly after their arrival, and Lord Fincastle stayed until late November, when he returned on the SS Kildonan Castle. He relinquished the command of the 31st battalion Imperial Yeomanry in January 1903, and returned to his regiment. For his service in South Africa was Mentioned in Despatches. In 1906, Murray was awarded the Royal Victorian Order for services to the Prince of Wales, in connection with the marriage of King Alfonso of Spain. When in February 1907 Murray's father died, he succeeded to the family titles, becoming the eighth earl, and resigned his commission to look after the family's considerable estates. He lived at 55 Lancaster Gate, London.

He returned to active duty in 1914 with the outbreak of World War I, serving as a staff officer on the Western Front. He was awarded the Distinguished Service Order during the Battle of the Somme, was mentioned in dispatches four times and wounded twice. Between the wars, Murray held political office, serving as a government whip in the House of Lords; first, as Captain of the Honourable Corps of Gentlemen-at-Arms in 1924; and then as a Lord-in-waiting from 1930 to 1936. He also held the ceremonial role of Deputy Lieutenant of Inverness-shire.

== Personal life ==
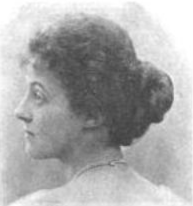
Lucinda Dorothea Kemble photographed by Alice Hughes

On 5 January 1904, he married Lucinda Dorothea Kemble, daughter of Colonel Horace William Kemble. They had three children:

- Lady Marjorie Hilda Murray (1904-2000)
- Edward David Murray, Viscount Fincastle (1908–1940). Killed in action in northern France on 5 June, while serving as a Captain with 4th Bn. Queen's Own Cameron Highlanders, he is buried at the London Cemetery and Extension on the Somme.
- Lady Mary Elizabeth Murray (1913-2000), married Major Peter Oldfield in April 1937.

He died in London on 29 January 1962 and was cremated at Golders Green Crematorium. His titles then passed to his grandson, John Alexander Murray (1939–1980), 9th Earl of Dunmore, 9th Viscount of Fincastle, 9th Lord Murray of Blair, Moulin and Tillimet, and 5th Baron Dunmore.

== Bibliography ==
- Fincastle VC, Viscount; Eliott-Lockhart, Percy Clare. [London: Methuen. 1898] A Frontier Campaign: A Narrative of the Operations of the Malakand and Buner Field Forces, 1897–1898. Barnsley: Naval & Military Press, 2005. ISBN 978-1-84574-256-0

Political offices
Preceded by The Earl of Clarendon	Captain of the Gentlemen-at-Arms; 1924	Succeeded by The Earl of Clarendon
Peerage of Scotland
Preceded by Charles Murray	Earl of Dunmore; 1907–1962	Succeeded by John Murray
