= Dunmore Pineapple =

Folly in Stirlingshire, Scotland, United Kingdom

The Dunmore Pineapple
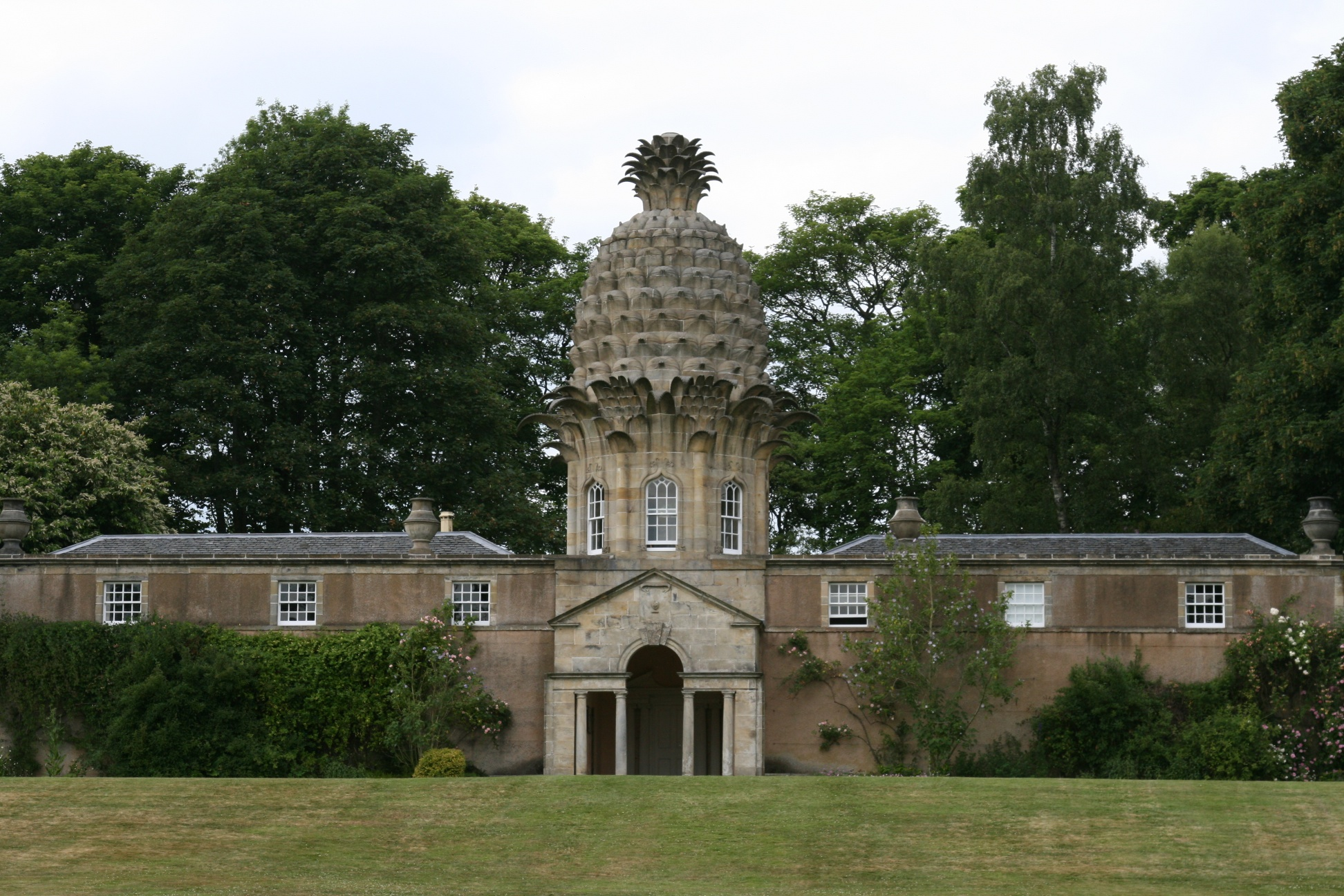
- Interactive map of the The Dunmore Pineapple area

General information
- Location: Scotland
- Coordinates: 56.07671°N 3.7867°W
- Owner: National Trust for Scotland

Inventory of Gardens and Designed Landscapes in Scotland
- Official name: The Pineapple
- Designated: 1 July 1987
- Reference no.: GDL00368

Inventory of Gardens and Designed Landscapes in Scotland
- Official name: Dunmore Park
- Designated: 1 July 1987
- Reference no.: GDL00158

The Dunmore Pineapple is a folly in Dunmore Park, near Airth in Stirlingshire, Scotland. In 1995, it was ranked "as the most bizarre building in Scotland".

== Walled garden at Dunmore Park ==
Dunmore Park, the ancestral home of the Earls of Dunmore, includes a large country mansion, Dunmore House, and grounds which contain, among other things, two large walled gardens. Walled gardens were a necessity for any great house in a northern climate in the eighteenth and nineteenth century, as a high wall of stone or brick helped to shelter the garden from wind and frost, and could create a microclimate in which the ambient temperature could be raised several degrees above that of the surrounding landscape. This allowed the cultivation of fruits and vegetables, and also of ornamental plants, which could not otherwise survive that far north.

The larger of the two gardens covers about six acres, located on a gentle south-facing slope. South-facing slopes are the ideal spot for walled gardens and for the cultivation of frost-sensitive plants. Along the north edge of the garden, the slope had probably originally been steeper. To allow both the upper and lower parts of the garden to be flat and level at different heights, it was necessary to bank up the earth on the higher northern side (away from the main house), behind a retaining wall about 16 feet (4.9 metres) high, and 3 ft 3 in (1.0 m) thick, which runs the entire length of the north side of the garden.

== Building ==
A building containing a hothouse was built into this wall in 1761 by John Murray, 4th Earl of Dunmore. The hothouse, which was located in the ground floor of the building, was used, among other things, for growing pineapples. The south ground floor, which is now covered in stucco and largely overgrown with vines, was originally covered with glass windowpanes. Additional heat was provided by a furnace-driven heating system that circulated hot air through cavities in the wall construction of the adjoining hothouse buildings. The smoke from the furnace was expelled through four chimneys, cleverly disguised as Grecian urns. The upper floor, which is at ground level when approached from the raised northern lawn, contained two small cottage-like apartments, or "bothies", for the gardeners.

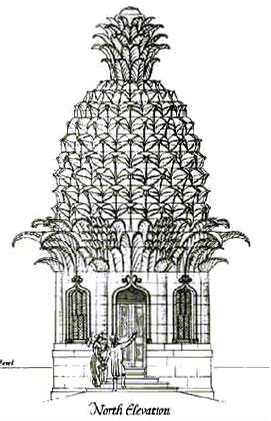
North elevation of the cupola. The pavilion, which is well above ground level when approached from the south, may be entered at ground level from the north.

Murray left Scotland after the initial structure had been built, and went on to become the last Colonial Governor of Virginia in America. The upper-floor pavilion or summerhouse with its pineapple-shaped cupola and the Palladian lower-floor portico on the south side were added after Murray's return from Virginia.

The building is a mixture of architectural styles. The south (ground floor) entrance takes the form of a characteristically Palladian Serliana archway, incorporating Tuscan columns. Visitors who step through this archway and into the vestibule below the pineapple face an elaborately framed doorway, flanked, on either side, by pairs of painted wooden Ionic columns, carved with great care, which display perfect fluting and even architecturally correct entasis. The keystone of the Serliana arch is inscribed with the date "1761." This has caused some people to speculate that the pineapple was constructed in 1761, although there is no clear evidence that the archway and the pineapple were built at the same time, or even designed by the same architect. Others suggest that the pineapple was constructed after Murray's return from America in 1776.

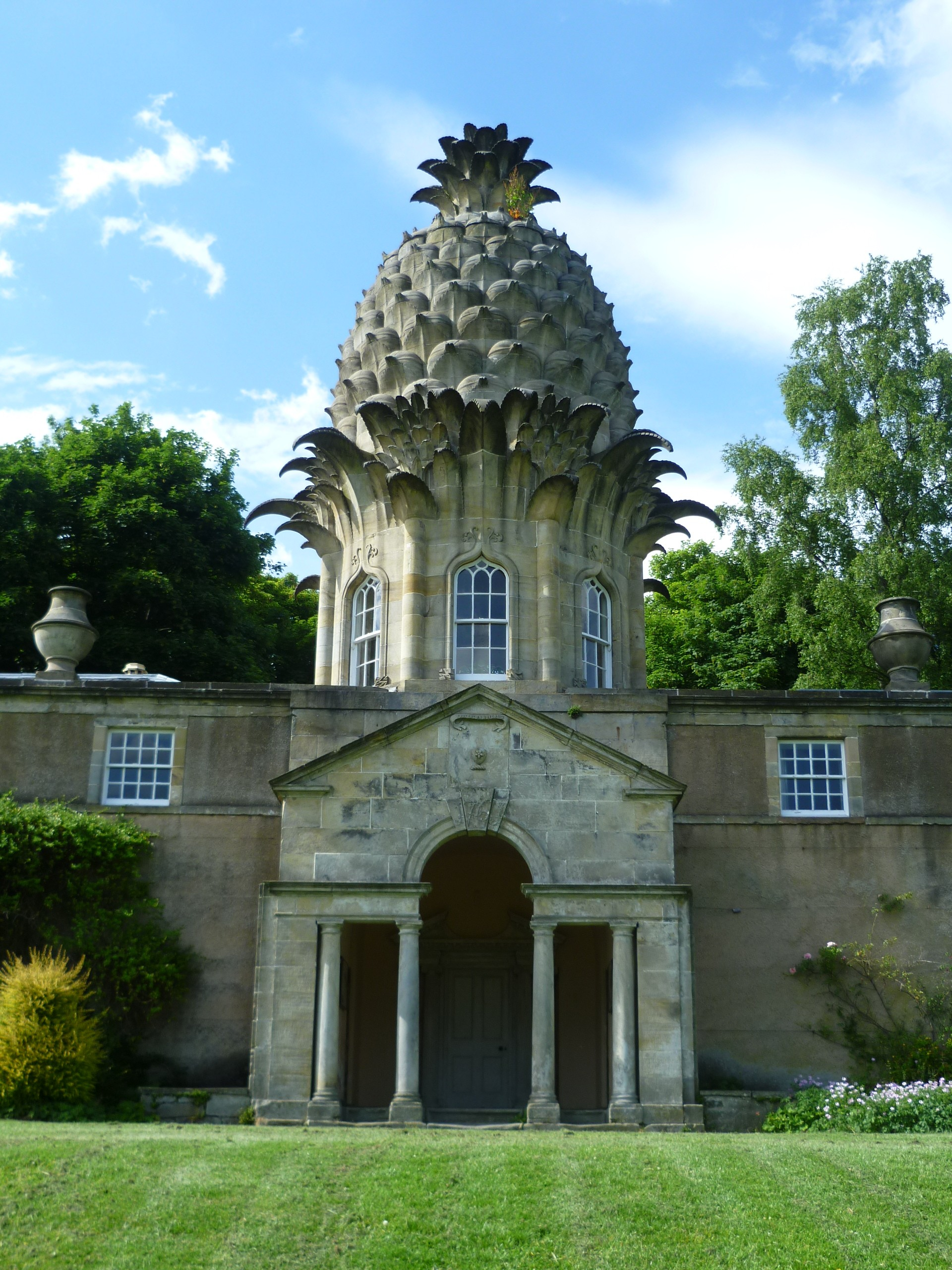
Pineapple viewed from the south

Above the Serliana arch is inserted a “later and clumsier” panel bearing a relief carving of a heart charged with a cinquefoil and inscribed with the motto Fidelis in Adversis. The design and motto are taken from the Douglas-Hamilton coat of arms, and probably commemorate the marriage, in 1803, of George Murray, the 5th Earl of Dunmore, to Lady Susan Douglas-Hamilton, daughter of Archibald Hamilton, 9th Duke of Hamilton.

The intricately carved stone pineapple, which is situated between the two bothies, forms an elaborate cupola atop an octagonal pavilion, with sash windows topped with Gothic ogee arches on seven sides and a door, topped with an ogee transom, on the eighth. The door, on the north side, exits onto the upper level of the garden. Inside the pavilion, the stone walls are gently curved, so that the room is circular rather than octagonal. Even the door and the panes of glass in the seven windows are curved, so as to match the curve of the walls in the room. The pavilion is just large enough to house a round table and some chairs.

The pineapple is around 14 metres (46 ft) high and constitutes a stunning example of the stonemason's craft, being a remarkably accurate depiction of a pineapple. Each of the curving stone leaves is separately drained to prevent frost damage, and the "stiff serrated edges of the lowest and topmost leaves and the plum berry-like fruits are all cunningly graded so that water cannot accumulate anywhere, ensuring that frozen trapped water cannot damage the delicate stonework."

Despite the unconventional design and the mix of architectural styles, the effect is harmonious because the pineapple and the portico are made of the same stone (ensuring a single colour from top to bottom) and are of a consistent width. Together, they draw the eye upwards in a single smooth motion. The height of the building, from the bottom of the lower floor to the top of the pineapple, is exactly half the width of the structure. Additionally, the width of the portico and pineapple matches the height of the south façade. Together, these elements, along with the four equally spaced urn-shaped chimneys, add to the sense of Classical order and harmony.

The identity of the designer of the folly is uncertain, but it is often attributed to Sir William Chambers who designed similar fanciful structures at Kew Gardens, and who showed a similarly meticulous attention to detail (including curved panes of glass and chimneys disguised as rooftop urns) in his design for the Casino at Marino, just outside Dublin.

== Pineapples as a decorative motif ==
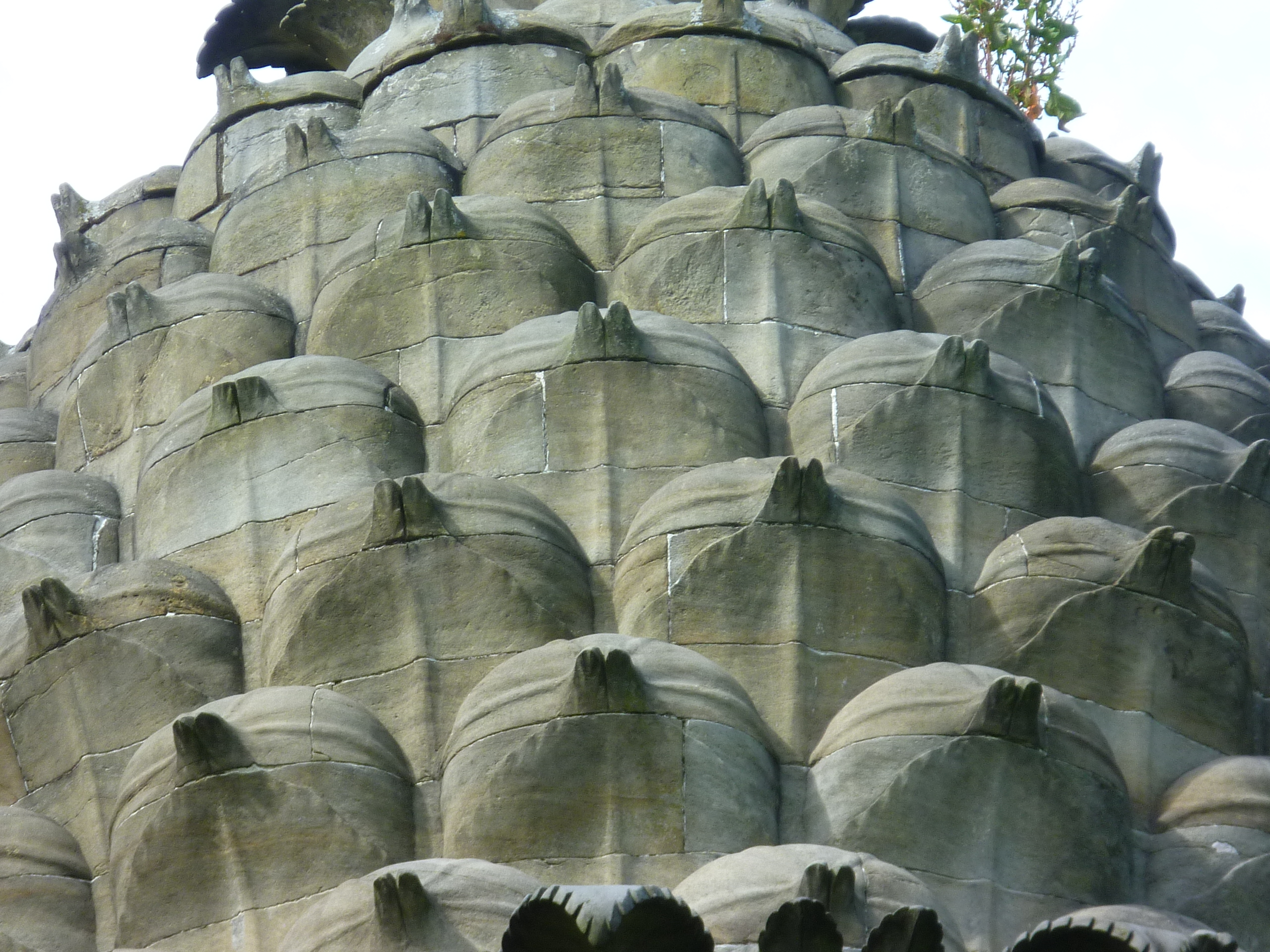
Cupola detail

First brought to Europe by Christopher Columbus from the Caribbean island of Guadeloupe in 1493, pineapples became a rare delicacy in Europe, with associations of power and wealth. Architects, artisans, and craftsmen adopted the pineapple as a motif, sculpting it into gateposts, railings, weather vanes and door lintels. The motif also featured prominently in interior decoration, fabrics, and furniture. In an article documenting an architectural dig in Glasgow, Geoffrey Stell called the Dunmore Pineapple "the ultimate expression of 18th-century pineapple fashion".

== Ownership and restoration history ==
After remaining in the family for centuries, the Dunmore Estate was broken up in 1970 and sold in lots. One lot, called the "Pineapple Lot", included the folly and the large walled garden, along with some woodlands and a small lake. This lot was purchased by the Countess of Perth, who, in 1974, gifted it to the National Trust for Scotland. The "Pineapple Lot" was then leased to the Landmark Trust, who restored the building and used it to provide holiday accommodation. The 6.5 hectares (16 acres) of gardens, including woodland, pond, and crab-apple orchard, are open to the public year-round.

In 1998, the 12th Earl of Dunmore, a resident of Australia, visited the grounds to plant a memorial tree.

As of 2024, one can rent the gardeners' quarters and the pineapple summerhouse as a holiday home. The bothy on one side of the Pineapple houses two bedrooms and a bathroom, and the bothy on the other side contains a kitchen and a spacious living room. The rooms have sash windows with a southern exposure overlooking the main (lower) lawn of the estate. Due to their southern exposure, the windows ensure that the rooms are sunlit throughout the day.

== Legacy ==
The Dunmore Pineapple is often considered one of the greatest follies in the United Kingdom, featuring on lists of the best follies from the news aggregator Huffington Post, environmental television series and magazine Countryfile and gardener-presenter Alan Titchmarsh.

In 1995, it was ranked "as the most bizarre building in Scotland".
