= Dunsmore =

Dunsmore is a name with a separate origin in Scotland and England.

== Scots place name and surname ==
Dunsmore is a surname and place name of Scottish origin, predating its first written mention in the Chartulary of the abbey of Lindores in 1198 AD.

The name Dunmore (Dundemor, Dunsmore) was given to a chapel of Lindores Abbey, at Abdie, at least as early as 1198 AD.

This location is presently known as Denmuir.

Dunmuir and Dunmuire also appear in historical records as variants of the name Dundemor, Dunmore or Dunsmore. However, according to Alexander Laing, F.S.A.Scot., 19th century Scots historian of Newburgh and environs, the namings Denmuir and Dunmuir are "erroneous".

According to known historical documentation the surname Dundemor was first used by one Waldino (Waldin, Waldeve) between 1199 and 1202 in medieval Scotland. Waldino de Dundemor is documented as witnessing the gift of Naughton to the Priory of St. Andrews.

Many people were documented as using Dundemor and its variants for their surname. Adopting a place name for a surname was a practice first used on continental Europe. This practice spread to the UK predominately after 1066 with the Norman Conquest and its Norman-French and Flemish nobility. In Scotland surnames taken from lands became more common after the Davidian Revolution. For example, there are early uses of the name by John de Dundemor and Henry de Dundemor.

Prior to Scottish unification of Picts and Gaels, circa 900 AD, it is believed that the inhabitants of Fife spoke a Brythonic Celtic language. Therefore, it is reasonable to assume that the origin of the word Dunsmore is Celtic, taken from dun, meaning hill fort and More from Mori, meaning sea.

Variants of the names are often due to the way in which the possessive is spoken in the different languages spoken in Scotland though the centuries: in Gaelic: Dun More or Dun Mor; in French: Dundemore or Dundemor; and in English: Dunsmore or Dunsmor. Additionally, the 'u' has sometimes been spoken as 'i' in the process of anglicising the name, yielding Dinsmore.

Further evidence of the origin of the name is attested to by the remains of a Fife hill fort, Dunmore, at position 56° 10' 15.65" N, 3° 20' 12.14" W which overlooks the Firth of Forth.

The history of the Dun[s]more family was described in Lindores Abbey and its burgh of Newburgh: their history and annuals (1876) by Alexander Laing. Quoting from pages 433–435:

Chapel of Dun[s]more

"Dunsmuir, more correctly Dunmore, [is found] in the parish of Abdie. In the confirmation of the Foundation Charter of Lindores Abbey by Pope Innocent III., A.D. 1198, 'the chapel of Dundemore' is described 'as belonging to the church of Londors.' The name is undoubtedly derived from the Gaelic Dun more, the great dun or fort on Norman's Law, There is a small chapel on the property, the walls of which are nearly entire, but roofless. It is of comparatively modern creation, but the stones of a much older chapel have been used in its construction and it is a legitimate inference to presume that they formed part of the chapel existing [in] A.D. 1198. Besides hewn work built among the rubble, the lintels of the gable windows are specially noticeable. They consist each of a single stone hewn into a semicircular or arched form, almost identical with some described by Dr. Petrie, as seen in very ancient Irish churches. The engraving of the window in the east gable of the chapel, at page 402, is from a drawing by Mr. Jervise of Brechin. It gives a most accurate representation of the original.

Forfeiture of the Isle of May

"The lands of Dunmore belonged to a family of great antiquity, who took their surname from the name of their property. Henry of Dundemore was a witness to the conveyance of the lands of Rathmuryel to the Monastery of Lundoris Abbey, in the year 1245.

"John of Dundemore was one of the Regents of Alexander III in his minority, 1249–1262.

"In the year 1260, 'a controversy arose between the monks of the Isle of May and Sir John of Dundemore, relative to the lands of Turbrech, in Fife, which, after many altercations, was settled by Sir John relinquishing all claim to the lands; in consideration of which the prior and monks granted him a monk to perform divine service in the chapel of the Blessed Virgin Mary in the Isle of May, for his soul, and the souls of his forefathers and successors. They were also to pay him half a merk of silver yearly, or sixty 'mulivelli' (a kind of fish abounding in the northern seas—the word has been translated mullet or haddock), as their option; and they also granted to him and his heirs a lamp of glass (to burn continually) in the church of Syreis, or Ceres, and for feeding it two gallons of oil, or twelve pence yearly. If they should fail to observe these conditions, Sir John was to have right of regress to the lands.'

"Henry of Dundemore, the successor of John, apparently not afraid for the loss of prayers of the monks, seized a horse belonging to them, because they would not swear fealty to him for the lands of Turbrech; but in 1285 the Bishop of St Andrews, as arbiter, decided 'that the monks were not bound to make the fealty claimed, and gave sentence that the horse be restored.'

The Scottish War of Independence

Edward I of England invaded Scotland in 1296. On 8 August 1296, Edward I ordered the removal of the coronation-stone of the Scottish kings, the scone stone, to Westminster in England. On August 9, he arrived at Lindores, in Fife. On August 28, Edward I ordered, on pain of death, that the Scottish abbots and noblemen swear fealty to him, thus forcing their signature on the Ragman Rolls.

Patrik de Dundemor and Henry de Dundemor are documented as del counte de Fyfe and were forced by Edward I to sign the 1296 Ragman Rolls.

According to eminent historian Alexander Laing, during the Scottish Wars of Independence:

"The Dundemores' seem to have been a family of great ability, and their talents raised them to high positions both in Church and State. In the struggle for Independence, they adhered to the patriotic side, and suffered in consequence. Among the petitions presented to Edward I for maintenance of wives of those whose estates had been seized because of their opposition to his claims, appears that of Isabella, widow of Simon of Dundemore, 3d September 1296. Her petition was endorsed with these words, Habeat quiete totum—Let her quietly have the whole.

"Sir Richard of Dundemore was taken captive at the Battle of Dunbar in 1296, and imprisoned in Winchester Castle, where he was confined for at least two years. On the 30 September 1298, an order allowing him fourpence a day for his maintenance while in prison, is preserved among the English Public Records.

"Thomas of Dundemore, Bishop of Ross, recognised the title of King Robert Bruce to the Crown of Scotland, AD 1309. In the same year, John of Dundemore affixed his seal as a witness to the settlement of the dispute between the Abbot and Convent of Lundoris and the Burgesses of Newburgh.

"Stephen of Dundemore, who is expressly mentioned as being descended from the Dundemores of that ilk in Fife, was elected Bishop of Glasgow AD 1317. The Bishop-elect being a keen supporter of Bruce, Edward II wrote to the Pope not to admit him to the Bishopric; and it would appear that he never was consecrated, having died, it is said, on his way to Rome.

"On the 27 June 1321, Sir John Dundemore conveyed by charter in free gift to the monks of Balmerino, the right to the water running through his land of Dunberauch for the use of their mill at Pigornoch. The bestowal of this gift was apparently made at the occasion of a festive gathering at Dunmore; The Bishop of St Andrews [Bishop William de Lamberton], the Abbot of Lundoris, Sir David de Berkeley (of Cullairnie), Sir Alexander Seton (Governor of Berwick), Alex of Claphain, and others, were present as witnesses; most of whom had borne their part in the great struggle for Independence."

Forfeiture of Lands

In addition to these forfeitures to the Church, the remaining lands of ancient Dunmores "seems to have come into the hands of the crown" in the 15th century. In 1507 James IV gave the lands of Nether Dunmure to Andrew Aytoun, Captain of Stirling Castle.

Emigration

Many Dinsmores, Dunmores, Dunsmuirs, and Dunsmores emigrated from Fife in the seventeenth century to the Americas, and to Ulster and Donegal in Northern Ireland. Many of these Dunsmores subsequently emigrated to Canada, the United States and Australia.

Alternate spellings

- Dunmor
- Dundemor
- Dunmore
- Dundemore
- Dunmoor
- Dunsmoor
- Dunmuir
- Dunsmuir
- Densmore
- Densmuir
- Denmuir
- Dinsmoor
- Dinsmore

=== Notable people with the surname Dunsmore ===
- Barrie Dunsmore, American journalist
- Drake Dunsmore (born 1988), American football player
- Fred Dunsmore (1929–2014), Canadian ice hockey player
- Pat Dunsmore (born 1959), American football player
- Rosemary Dunsmore (born 1953), Canadian actress
- John Densmore (born 1940) American musician (drummer for The Doors), songwriter, author, and actor

== As an English place name ==
Dunsmore is the name of several places in England. The place name is Old English in origin, taken from personal name Dunn + mor and means Dunna's moor.

Places called Dunsmore include:

- Dunsmore, Buckinghamshire
- Dunsmore, Devon
- Dunsmore, Warwickshire
  - Bourton-on-Dunsmore
  - Clifton-upon-Dunsmore
  - Dunsmore Farm
  - Dunsmore Heath
  - Ryton-on-Dunsmore
  - Stretton-on-Dunsmore
- Dunsmore Green, Forthampton, Gloucestershire

Clifton upon Dunsmore is not referred to as such until 1306 AD. Prior references list it simply as "Cliptone" in 1086 AD and "Cliftun ultra Tamedan" in 934 AD.

Ryton-on-Dunsmore is referred to as "Ruiton" in 1209 AD, "Riton" in 1150 AD and "Rieton" in 1086 AD. There is no clear date for the time at which Dunsmore was added to the name, although it is suggested that Dunsmore came into use in the 12th century.

Dunsmore in Warwickshire is also the source of the title Baron Dunsmore granted to Francis Leigh, 1st Earl of Chichester in 1628.
