= Countess of Dunmore =

Countess of Dunmore is a title given to the wife of the Earl of Dunmore. Those who have held the title include:

- Lady Charlotte Murray (née Stewart) (d. 11 November 1818), wife of John Murray, 4th Earl of Dunmore. Lady Charlotte was the daughter of Alexander Stewart, 6th Earl of Galloway, and the mother of Lady Augusta Murray.
- Lady Susan Hamilton (died 1846), wife of the fifth Earl
- Catherine Murray, Countess of Dunmore (née Herbert) (1814–1886) wife of the sixth Earl
