= George Stirling =

George Stirling may refer to:

- George Faulds Stirling, English-born educator, rancher and political figure in British Columbia
- Sir George Stirling, 9th Baronet, Scottish British Army officer
