= Amhuinnsuidhe Castle =

Country house in Outer Hebrides, Scotland

Coordinates: 57°57′44″N 6°59′23″W

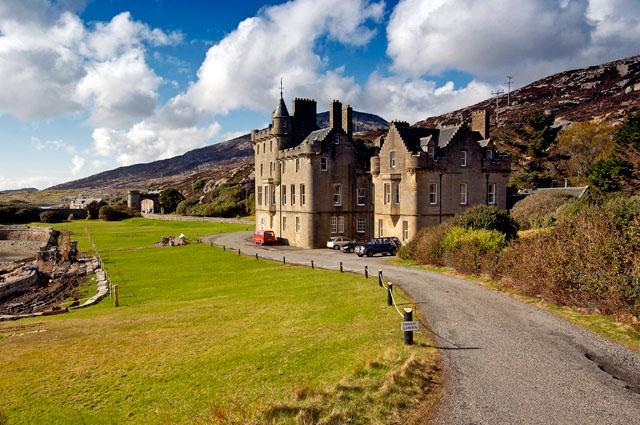

- Location within Harris
- Former names: Fincastle

General information
- Architectural style: Scottish baronial architecture
- Ordnance Survey: NB 04956 07806
- Year built: 1864–1867

Design and construction
- Architect: David Bryce
- Designations: Category A listed

Amhuinnsuidhe Castle is a large 19th-century private country house on Harris, one of the Western Isles of Scotland. It was designated as a Category A listed building in 1971 and is now operated as a hotel and shooting estate.

== History ==
Originally named Fincastle, the house was built in the Scottish baronial style by architect David Bryce in 1864–1867 for Charles Murray, 7th Earl of Dunmore (styled Viscount Fincastle until 1845), whose grandfather George Murray, 5th Earl of Dunmore had purchased the island in 1834. J M Barrie found inspiration for his play Mary Rose while staying at the castle in 1912 and visiting the nearby Loch Voshimid, "where we found Mary Rose". In 2003, Amhuinnsuidhe Castle Estate purchased the castle and the fishing rights, while the North Harris Estate was transferred into community ownership. The castle is now operated as a venue for fishing, shooting parties, weddings and corporate events.

In 2024 the house was used as a film location for a Gaelic language four-part television drama, An t-Eilean.

== Description ==
The house is squeezed into a narrow level space between the sea and the hill rising behind the house and both have to be restrained by walls in front and behind. The lack of level ground is probably why the main road skirts the front of the house, very unusual for a country house. It is built of imported freestone, stugged and snecked ashlar; rubbled masonry is used at the rear. The castellated four-storey main block has a corner turret and rounded corners. Its eastwards three-storey extension has a first-storey oriel window with flanking bartizans. The flanking blocks are only three storeys high and the western block is recessed from the road. The eastern block is even with the main block, but it is connected to the main block by a deeply recessed range, possibly to suggest a 17th-century addition to an older house. Gables are crowstepped throughout.

== See also ==
- Amhuinnsuidhe
