= L. W. Hinxman =

Scottish geologist

FRSE L. W. Hinxman
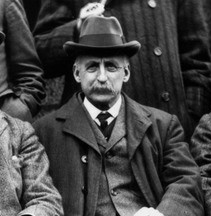
- Photograph of Hinxman in 1914

Personal details
- Born: Lionel Wondsworth Hinxman; 21 March 1855 Dunmore, Scotland
- Died: 29 April 1936 (aged 81) Ringwood, England

Lionel Wordsworth Hinxman FRSE (21 March 1855 – 29 April 1936) was a Scottish geologist who was a fellow of the Royal Society of Edinburgh. Hinxman was noted for his passion and expertise on mountains in Scotland.

== Early life and education ==
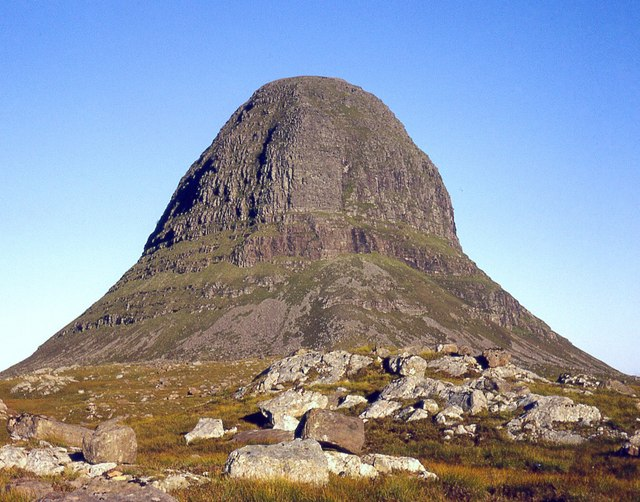
Photograph of Suilven, which was subject to an 1890 publication by Hinxman

Hinxman was born on 21 March 1855 in Dunmore, near Falkirk in Stirlingshire. He was the son of Rev. Charles Hinxman and his wife, Emmeline Fisher of Poulshot. His parents had married in Wiltshire in 1850, and had only recently moved to Scotland.

He was sent back to England for education, firstly at Marlborough College then Cheltenham College before winning a place at Cambridge University where he graduated BA in 1877.

== Career ==
Beginning in 1883, he worked for HM Geological Survey alongside John Horne and Ben Peach. He rose to the position of District Geologist in 1905.

He was elected a Fellow of the Royal Society of Edinburgh in 1902. His proposers were James Geikie, John Horne, Ben Peach and Ramsay Heatley Traquair.

He retired in 1919 and returned to England. His role as District Geologist was filled by Murray Macgregor.

== Personal life and death ==
He was married to Elizabeth Saunders. He died in Ringwood in Hampshire on 29 April 1936.

== Publications ==
See

- Suilven (1890)
- Ben Eighe and the Torridon Hills (1891)
- Beinn Bhan of Applecross (1892)
- The Geology of the Neighbourhood of Edinburgh (1910)
- The Geology of the Districts of Braemar, Ballater and Glen Clova (1912)
- Ben Wyvis (1912)
- The Geology of Upper Strathspey, Gaick and the Forest of Atholl (1913)
- The Geology of the Country around Beauly and Inverness (1914)
- The Economic Geology of the Central Coalfield of Scotland (1921)
- The Geology of the Lower Findhorn and Lower Strath Nairn (1923)
