= Dunmore, Falkirk =

Coordinates: 56.084°N 3.781°W

Dunmore: Scottish Gaelic: An Dùn Mòr
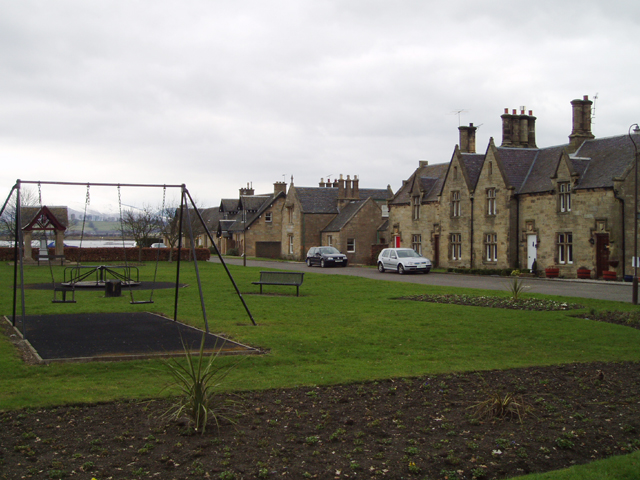
- The village green at Dunmore

- Location within the Falkirk council area
- Population: 70 (2001 census)
- OS grid reference: NS891893
  - Edinburgh: 24.8 mi (39.9 km) SE
  - London: 350 mi (560 km) SSE
- Civil parish: Airth
- Council area: Falkirk
- Lieutenancy area: Stirling and Falkirk
- Country: Scotland
- Sovereign state: United Kingdom
- Post town: FALKIRK
- Postcode district: FK2
- Dialling code: 01324
- Police: Scotland
- Fire: Scottish
- Ambulance: Scottish
- UK Parliament: Falkirk
- Scottish Parliament: Falkirk East
- Website: falkirk.gov.uk dunmorevillage.co.uk

Dunmore is a small village in the Falkirk council area of Scotland. It lies 6.5 miles (10.5 km) south east of Stirling and 5.5 miles (8.9 km) north of Falkirk. The village lies along the A905 road between Throsk and Airth on the banks of the River Forth.

The population of Dunmore was recorded as 70 in the United Kingdom Census 2001, and as 79 in the census of 1991.

Formerly known as Elphinstone Pans, the settlement was entirely remodelled as a planned village in the 1840s by the local landowner, the Countess of Dunmore. Dunmore is a conservation area.

== Landmarks ==
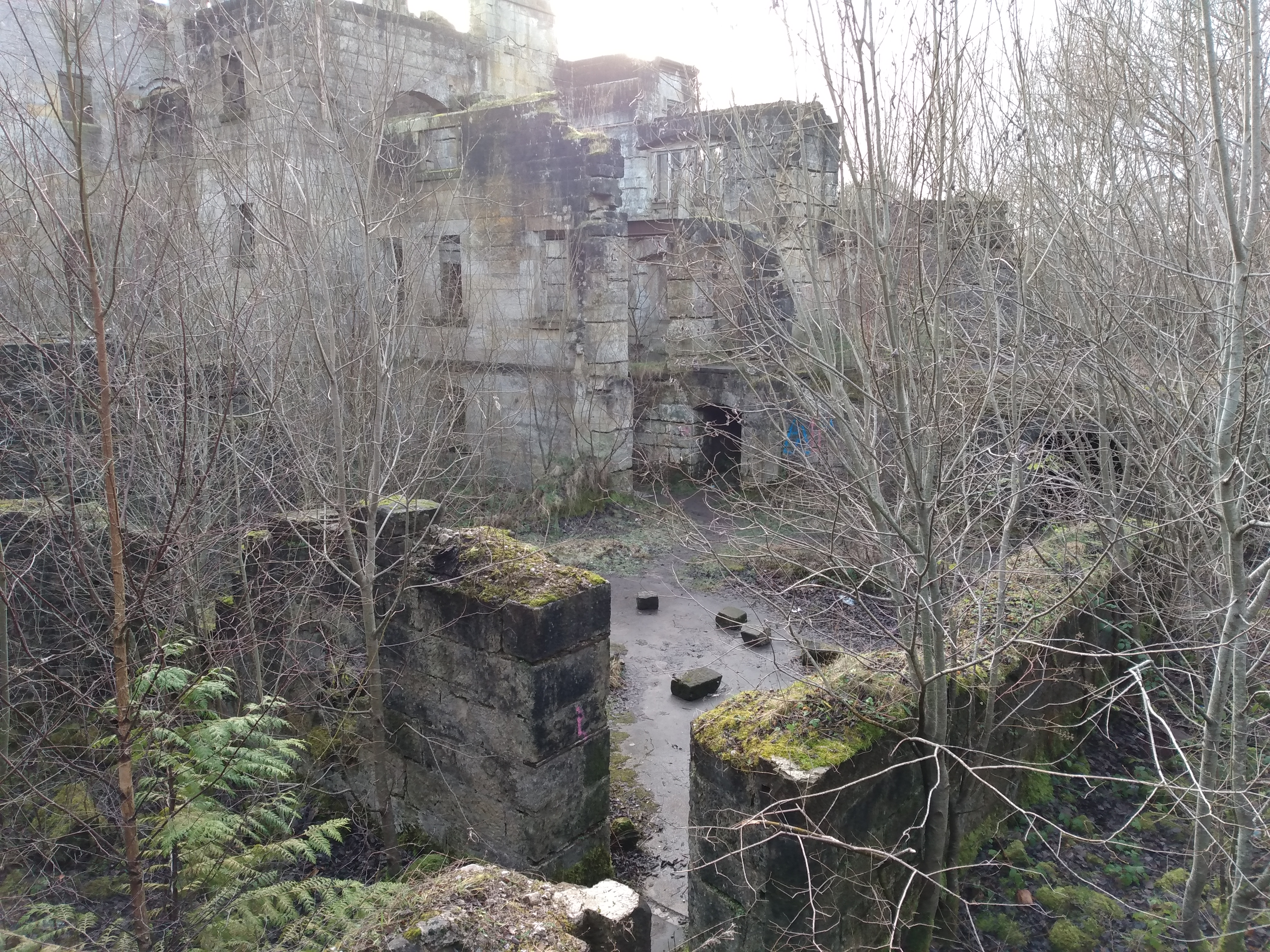
The ruinous remains of Dunmore Park House.

The Dunmore Pineapple, an 18th-century folly owned by the National Trust for Scotland, lies south of Dunmore, on the estate of the now-derelict Dunmore Park House.

== Notable people ==
- Dr L. W. Hinxman FRSE (1855-1936) a geologist and son of the local minister, Rev Charles Hinxman, was born and raised in Dunmore.

== See also ==
- List of places in Falkirk council area
