= Harold Gore Browne =

Colonel Harold Gore Brown (18 September 1856 - 4 January 1938) commanded the First Battalion of the King's Royal Rifle Corps in the Boer War of 1899–1900, and took part in the Relief of Ladysmith.

He was a member of the King's Bodyguard from 1905 until 1928 as one of H.M. Honourable Corp of Gentlemen-at-Arms. Gore Brown was the Honorary Secretary of the Fair Trade League.

== Family ==
Harold was the son of Thomas Gore Browne, brother to Ethel Locke King and Wilfrid Gore Browne. He was married to Lady Muriel Murray, daughter of Charles Murray, 7th Earl of Dunmore. His brother Francis's son, Stewart Gore Browne of Shiwa Ngandu was Harold's nephew.

He died at his sister's home on 4 January 1938 at the age of 81 with his funeral held at Weybridge.

== Military career ==
Gore-Browne was commissioned a lieutenant in the King's Royal Rifle Corps on 11 February 1876, and promoted to captain on 18 April 1885. He served with the 1st battalion of his regiment in the Miranzai expedition in 1891, and with the Isazai expedition September-October 1892 under General Sir William Lockhart, following which he was promoted to major on 4 January 1893. He served with the Chitra Relief force under Sir Robert Low in 1895, including the capture of the Malakand Pass and the engagement at Khar.

Gore-Browne was promoted to lieutenant-colonel on 23 October 1899 and appointed in command of the 2nd Battalion King′s Royal Rifles, stationed in India. Following the outbreak of the Second Boer War the same month, he was posted to South Africa where he took part with the 1st Battalion in the defense of Ladysmith, until the relief of that city in March 1900. He was reported to leave Durban for home on the SS Majestic in April 1900, then returned to India with his battalion.
