= Charles Murray (diplomat) =

British author and diplomat (1806–1895)

The Right Honourable Sir Charles Augustus Murray PC KCB
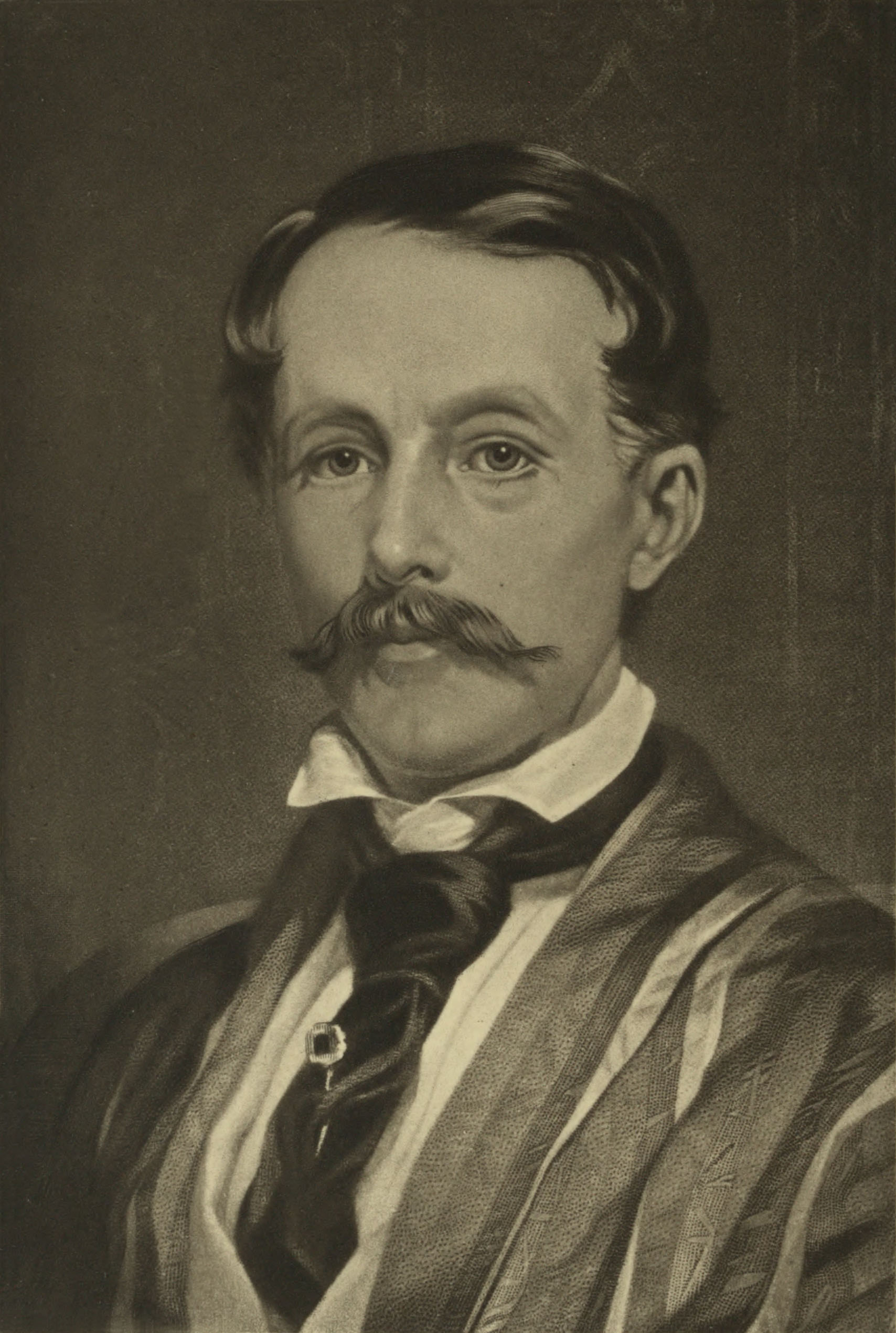

Envoy Extraordinary and Minister Plenipotentiary to the King of Portugal
- In office 1867–1874
- Preceded by: Edward Thornton
- Succeeded by: Robert Bulwer-Lytton

Envoy Extraordinary and Minister Plenipotentiary to the King of Saxony
- In office 1859–1866
- Preceded by: Augustus Paget
- Succeeded by: John Lumley

Envoy Extraordinary and Minister Plenipotentiary to the Shah of Persia
- In office 1854–1858
- Preceded by: Sir William Taylour Thomson (chargé d'affaires)
- Succeeded by: Sir Henry Rawlinson

Minister Plenipotentiary to the Swiss Confederation
- In office 1853–1854
- Preceded by: Andrew Buchanan
- Succeeded by: George John Robert Gordon

Master of the Household
- In office 1838–1844
- Preceded by: Sir Frederick Beilby Watson
- Succeeded by: Henry Meynell

Personal details
- Born: Charles Augustus Murray; 2 November 1806
- Died: 3 June 1895 (aged 88)
- Spouses: Elizabeth Wadsworth (m. 1850; died 1851) The Hon. Edith Susan Esther FitzPatrick (m. 1862)
- Relations: John Murray, 4th Earl of Dunmore (grandfather); Archibald Hamilton, 9th Duke of Hamilton (grandfather)
- Children: Charles James Murray; Cecil Henry Alexander Murray
- Parent(s): George Murray, 5th Earl of Dunmore; Lady Susan Hamilton
- Education: Eton College
- Alma mater: Oriel College, Oxford
- Occupation: Author, diplomat

Sir Charles Augustus Murray (22 November 1806 – 3 June 1895) was a British author and diplomat.

== Early life ==
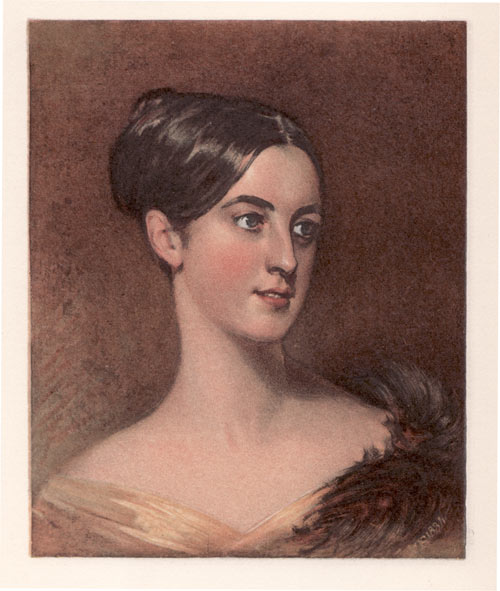
His first wife, Elise Wadsworth by Thomas Sully, 1834

Murray was the second of three sons born to George Murray, 5th Earl of Dunmore, and the former Lady Susan Hamilton. His elder brother was Alexander Murray, 6th Earl of Dunmore who married Lady Catherine Herbert (daughter of the 11th Earl of Pembroke). His younger brother was the Hon. Henry Anthony Murray, a Rear Admiral in the Royal Navy, who died unmarried.

His paternal grandparents were the former Lady Charlotte Stewart (a daughter of Alexander Stewart, 6th Earl of Galloway) and John Murray, 4th Earl of Dunmore, the former colonial governor of the Province of New York and Virginia. His aunt, Lady Augusta Murray, married Prince Augustus Frederick, a younger son of King George III. His maternal grandparents were Archibald Hamilton, 9th Duke of Hamilton and the former Lady Harriet Stewart (a daughter of Alexander Stewart, 6th Earl of Galloway). Among his maternal relatives were aunts Lady Anne Hamilton (lady-in-waiting to Queen Caroline), and Lady Charlotte Hamilton (wife of the 11th Duke of Somerset) and uncles, Alexander Hamilton, 10th Duke of Hamilton and Lord Archibald Hamilton.

He was educated at Eton College and Oriel College, Oxford, where he matriculated in 1824, and graduated B.A. in 1827.

Murray spent several years travelling across Europe and America from 1835 and 1838, including several months with a Pawnee tribe in 1835. He described his experiences in his popular book Travels in North America (1839). There he fell in love with Elizabeth "Elise" Wadsworth, a daughter of New York landowner James Wadsworth who disapproved of the match. He attempted to remain in the United States as Secretary of the British Legation, but failed to obtain the position. He returned to England, and wrote of his experiences in a novel, The Prairie-Bird (1844).

== Career ==
On three occasions Murray stood as a Member of Parliament, but was unsuccessful each time. He obtained a position, from 1838 to 1844, as Master of the Household and Extra Groom in Waiting in the Court of the young Queen Victoria. He was removed in the Household reforms initiated by Albert, Prince Consort.

=== Diplomatic career ===
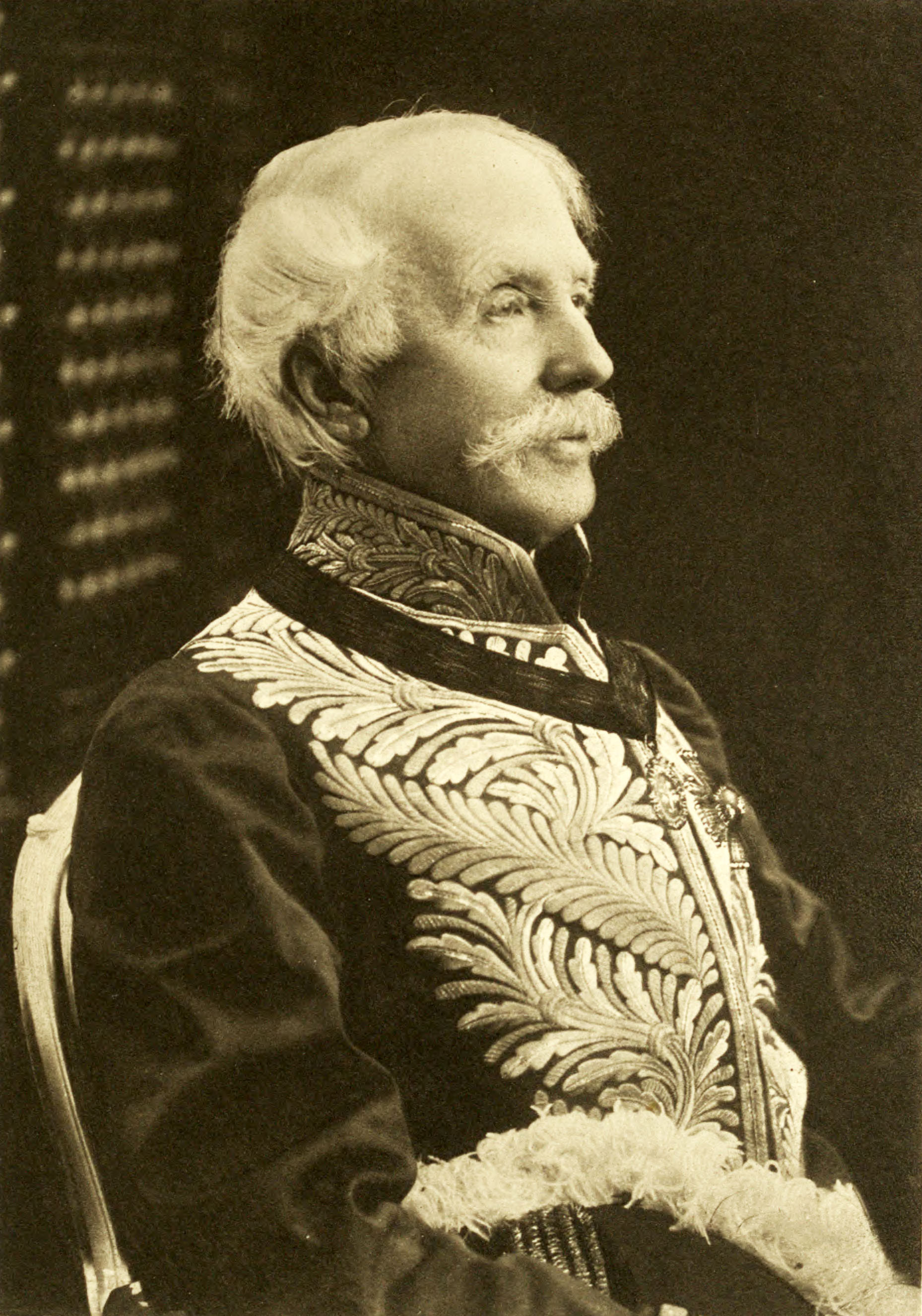
Sir Charles Murray in later years

Murray then became a diplomat, serving first as Secretary of the Legation in Naples. He was consul-general in Egypt from 1846 to 1853, on good terms with the Ottoman Viceroy, Mehmet Ali Pasha. While stationed there, he arranged the transport of Obaysch the hippopotamus to England in 1850. Obaysch was the first hippopotamus in England since prehistoric times, and the first in Europe since Roman times. For this later feat, and his clear affection for the beast at London Zoo, he was nicknamed "Hippopotamus Murray". He also pushed forward the construction of the railway to Alexandria.

From 1853, Murray was for one year Minister Plenipotentiary to the Swiss Confederation in Bern. He was then appointed British ambassador to the Court of the Shah of Persia in 1854. The Shah, Nasser al-Din Shah, and Murray disliked each other immediately. Murray's heavy-handed attitude inflamed an existing dispute over Hashim Khan, one of the Shah's bodyguards and an officer in the Persian army, who took up a position as secretary in the British embassy against the wishes of the Shah and his prime minister. Hashim Khan's wife was the subject of widespread gossip relating to Murray and his predecessor as ambassador; she was also a sister of the Shah's principal wife, so the scandal was political dynamite. Hashim Khan's wife was taken into custody by her brother on 14 November 1855, to defend her honour. Murray took this as an insult to the British legation; after demanding her release, Murray broke off diplomatic relations on 20 November. Anglo-Persian relations were already strained as the young Shah sought to annex the city of Herat, a goal which had eluded the Qajar dynasty previously; and Britain for its part sought to deny such control, lest the city, considered the "Key to India," fall under the influence of Persia's patron, Russia. Murray's departure marked a break in Anglo-Persian relations and thus contributed to the outbreak of the Anglo-Persian War of 1856/7. After the war, Murray remained ambassador until 1859.

In 1859, he became Envoy to the King of Saxony, serving until 1866 when he became Envoy at Lisbon from 1866 to 1874. Upon his return to the United Kingdom, he became a member of the Privy Council in 1875.

== Personal life ==
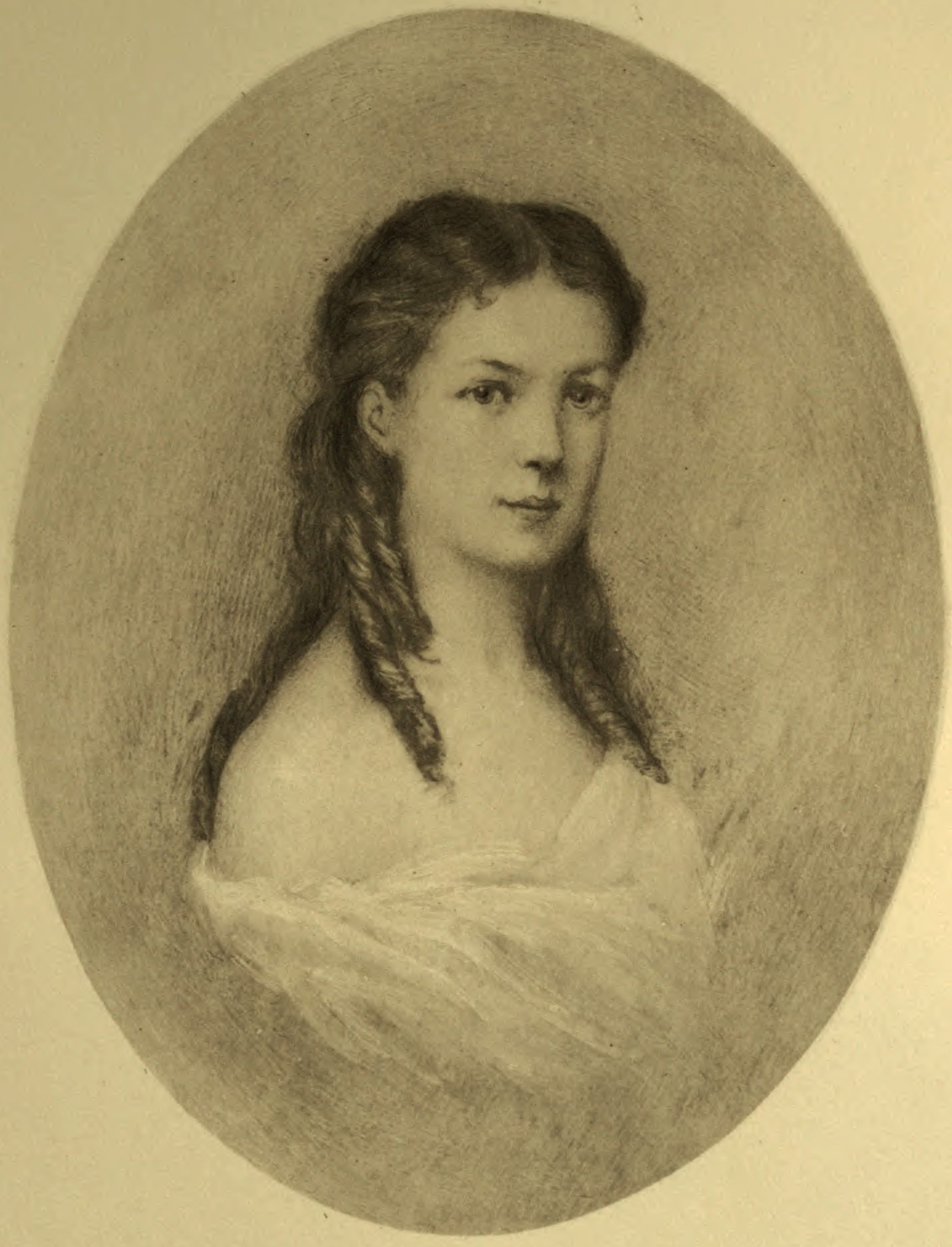
Edith Susan Esther FitzPatrick, Sir Charles's second wife

After Elizabeth Wadsworth's father James Wadsworth died in 1844, Murray married Elise on 12 December 1850 during a visit to Scotland while he was counsel-general in Cairo. After they married, the couple returned to Egypt together. She died on 8 December 1851 shortly after giving birth to their only child:

- Charles James Murray (1851–1929), a Conservative Party politician and diplomat who married Lady Anne Francesca Wilhelmina Finch, the only daughter of Heneage Finch, 6th Earl of Aylesford.

Murray married a second time, on 1 November 1862, to his first cousin once removed the Honourable Edith Susan Esther FitzPatrick, daughter of John FitzPatrick, 1st Baron Castletown and the former Augusta Mary Douglas (the daughter of Rev. Archibald Douglas and Murray's aunt, Lady Susan Murray). From his second marriage, he was a father of:

- Cecil Henry Alexander Murray (1866–1896), who died at sea on 3 June 1896 at age 30.

Sir Charles died on 3 June 1895. His widow lived nearly another decade until her death on 1 December 1906.

Diplomatic posts
Preceded by Andrew Buchanan	Minister Plenipotentiary to the Swiss Confederation; 1853–1854	Succeeded by George John Robert Gordon
Preceded by Sir William Taylour Thomson (chargé d'affaires)	Envoy Extraordinary and Minister Plenipotentiary to the Shah of Persia; 1854–1858	Succeeded by Sir Henry Rawlinson
Preceded by Augustus Paget	Envoy Extraordinary and Minister Plenipotentiary to the King of Saxony; 1859–1866	Succeeded by John Lumley
Preceded by Edward Thornton	Envoy Extraordinary and Minister Plenipotentiary to the King of Portugal; 1867–1874	Succeeded by Robert Bulwer-Lytton
