= Peter Oldfield =

English cricketer

Personal information
- Full name: Peter Carlton Oldfield
- Born: 27 February 1911; Headingley, Yorkshire, England
- Died: 16 July 2002 (aged 91); Highclere, Hampshire, England
- Height: 6 ft 2 in (1.88 m)
- Batting: Right-handed
- Role: Wicket-keeper

Domestic team information
- Years: Team
- 1931–1933: Oxford University
- 1934: Marylebone Cricket Club

Career statistics
Competition	First-class
Matches	24
Runs scored	237
Batting average	9.87
100s/50s	–/–
Top score	36
Catches/stumpings	26/33
- Source: Cricinfo, 16 February 2020

Peter Carlton Oldfield OBE (27 February 1911 – 16 July 2002) was an English first-class cricketer and British Army officer. Oldfield played his first-class cricket predominantly for Oxford University between 1931–1933, earning a reputation as a skilled wicket-keeper. During the Second World War he served in North Africa with the Special Air Service (SAS), during the course of which he was captured and subsequently escaped.

== Early life and cricket ==
The son of Carlton Oldfield, a surgeon, Oldfield was born at Headingley in February 1911. He was educated at Repton School under the headmastership of Geoffrey Fisher, before going up to University College, Oxford.

While studying at Oxford, Oldfield made his debut in first-class cricket for Oxford University against Leicestershire at Oxford in 1931. He played as Oxford's first-choice wicket-keeper ahead of Vivian Jenkins, making a total of twenty first-class appearances for Oxford. He made additional first-class appearances while at Oxford for The Rest against the MCC touring team to Australia, and for the Gentlemen in the Gentlemen v Players fixture of 1933. A year after graduating from Oxford, he made two appearances for the Marylebone Cricket Club at Lord's against Yorkshire and the touring Australians. An unusually tall wicket-keeper, standing at 6 ft 2 in (1.88 m), Oldfield was a skilled keeper, taking 26 catches and making 33 stumpings in his 24 first-class matches.

Upon leaving Oxford, Oldfield qualified as a surveyor and was headhunted by Sir Howard Frank and joined Frank's estate agency business, Knight, Frank and Rutley, where he specialised in the agricultural land side of the business. He married Lady Mary Elizabeth Murray, the daughter of Alexander Murray, 8th Earl of Dunmore in April 1937.

== Second World War ==
With the start of the Second World War in September 1939, Oldfield was commissioned into the Warwickshire Yeomanry as a second lieutenant and was posted to British Palestine. Frustrated by a lack of action, Oldfield was transferred to Cairo in 1941, where he used his skills as a surveyor in the Air Reconnaissance Unit (ARU). While commanding the ARU, he formed a close partnership with Special Air Service (SAS) and David Stirling, which paved his way to join the SAS in September 1942. He was mentioned in dispatches in December 1942. Toward the end of the North African campaign, Stirling devised a plan to insert more than 200 men behind enemy lines in Libya. Moving out in November 1942, Oldfield was assigned to patrol the gap between A and B Squadrons. After a number of successful raids, the SAS depot at Bir Faschia was captured by the Germans, leaving the patrols short on supplies. Evading capture, Oldfield mined the coastal road, attacked convoys and destroyed more than twenty planes at the airfield at Tuorga. The following night he returned to the airfield to destroy the remaining two fighters, but the Germans had intercepted a message from the Eighth Army HQ and were lying in wait for Oldfield. Oldfield was spotted by searchlights at the airfield and chased by several armoured cars, though he managed to evade them throughout the night, despite his own jeep catching fire and stalling at one point. Having evaded capture, he continued to harass the Germans for another four weeks until his was finally captured, having been shot in the neck and paralysed down his left side.

=== Capture and subsequent escape ===
Following his capture, he was personally interrogated by Field Marshal Erwin Rommel, however he refused to divulge information about SAS operations and was threatened with execution for being a spy. His life was saved by a sympathetic German surgeon, who had been captured by the SAS, treated well and allowed to return to his own lines. Oldfield was smuggled in a lorry to Tripoli, where he was treated at an Italian field hospital. Following a visit from the Italian Red Cross, he was transferred to POW hospitals in Italy. In August 1943, he was the senior British officer in a POW hospital in Milan when he it was bombed and seriously damaged, with a partially recovered Oldfield leading the efforts that resulted in fifteen men being pulled out alive. In September 1943, Italy formally surrendered and Oldfield escaped from captivity by walking out of a POW hospital in Bergamo. Still in pain from his wounds, he evaded German patrols and made for Switzerland, escaping across Lake Como in a fishing boat. After three weeks on the run, he crossed into Switzerland on October 1. He was repatriated to England in 1944, and resigned his commission on account of disability in June 1945, at which point he was granted the honorary rank of major. He was made an OBE in October 1945.

== Later life ==
After the war, Oldfield resumed his career with Knight Frank & Rutley. He was among the first to encourage the new trend of buying land for investment and in 1966 he became a senior partner at Knight Frank & Rutley. Prior to his retirement in 1972, he led efforts to expand the business overseas. He retired to Kingsclere in Hampshire, where he owned several race horses. He died at Highclere in July 2002, with his wife having predeceased him by two years.
