= Charles Murray, 7th Earl of Dunmore =

British politician and nobleman (1841–1907)

The Right Honourable The Earl of Dunmore VD DL
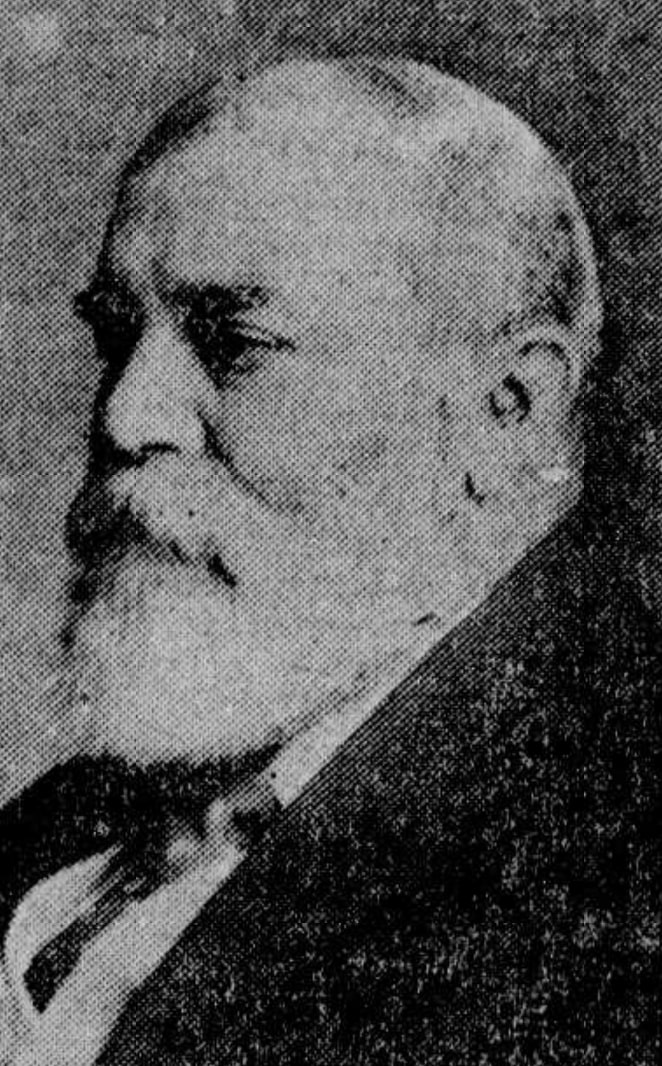
- Lord Dunmore, c. 1903

Lord Lieutenant of Stirlingshire
- In office 1875–1885
- Preceded by: The Duke of Montrose
- Succeeded by: The Duke of Montrose

Personal details
- Born: Charles Adolphus Murray; 24 March 1841 London, England
- Died: 27 August 1907 (aged 66)
- Party: Conservative
- Spouse: Lady Gertrude Coke (m. 1866, died)
- Children: 6
- Parent(s): Alexander Murray, 6th Earl of Dunmore; Lady Catherine Herbert
- Education: Eton College

Charles Adolphus Murray, 7th Earl of Dunmore VD DL (24 March 1841 – 27 August 1907), styled Viscount Fincastle from birth until 1845, was a British Conservative politician, explorer, author, aristocrat and artist.

== Early life ==
He was born in London on 24 March 1841. He was the only son of Alexander Murray, 6th Earl of Dunmore and his wife, Lady Catherine Herbert. His three sisters were Lady Susan Murray (wife of the 9th Earl of Southesk), Lady Constance Murray (wife of the 15th Lord Elphinstone), and Lady Victoria Murray (wife of Rev. Henry Cunliffe).

His paternal grandparents were George Murray, 5th Earl of Dunmore and Lady Susan Hamilton (a daughter of the 9th Duke of Hamilton). His maternal grandparents were Gen. George Herbert, 11th Earl of Pembroke, and the Russian noblewoman Countess Catherine Woronzoff (or Vorontsova), daughter of the Russian ambassador to St James's, Semyon Romanovich Vorontsov.

On 16 July 1845, four year old Charles succeeded his father as Earl of Dunmore. He received his education at Eton College.

== Career ==
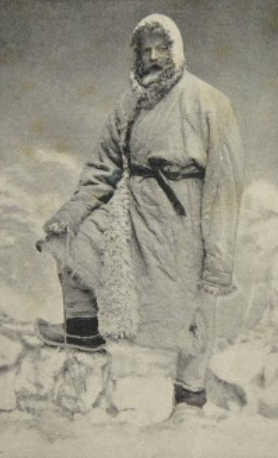
Lord Dunmore c. 1893, in the Pamir Mountains

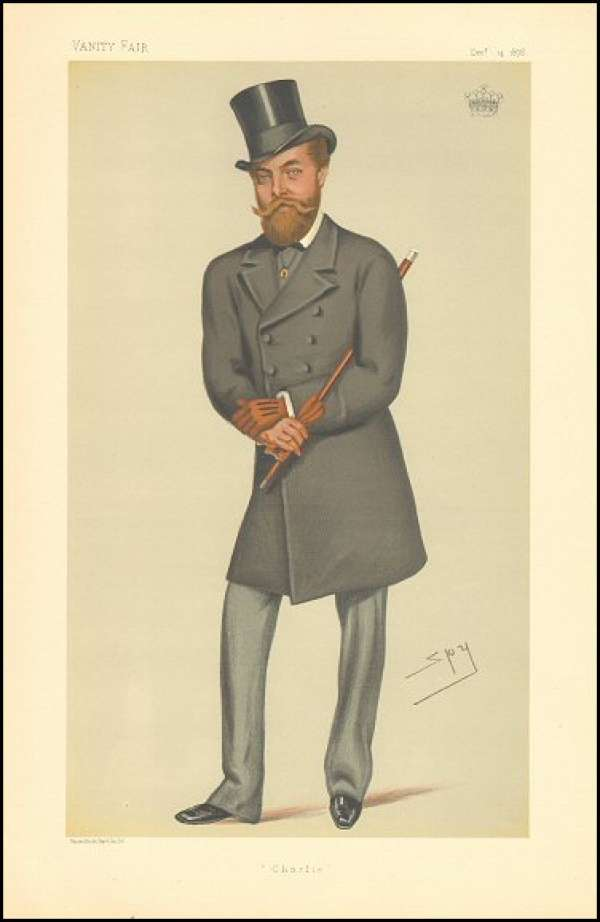
"Charlie". Caricature by Spy published in Vanity Fair in 1878.

He travelled to North America to observe the American Civil War with a number of other British officers. He then travelled at least as far as southern Manitoba and painted a number of watercolours across the United States and Canada.

In 1874, he was appointed a Lord-in-waiting in Disraeli's government, a post he held until 1880.

In 1875, he was made Lord Lieutenant of Stirlingshire, which he remained until 1885. He also served as Deputy Lieutenant of Inverness-shire. In 1882 he was appointed lieutenant-colonel of the 1st Inverness-shire Rifle Volunteers (later the 1st Volunteer Battalion, Queen's Own Cameron Highlanders). He retired in 1896. He was awarded the Volunteer Officers Decoration on 6 February 1903.

In 1883, the Canadian Pacific Railway named Dunmore, Alberta in his honour.

In 1892 to 1893, Lord Dunmore travelled through the eastern Pamirs to Kashgar. He was engaged in some form of diplomacy or espionage but the matter is not clear.

== Personal life ==
On 5 April 1866, Lord Dunmore married Lady Gertrude Coke, third daughter of Thomas Coke, 2nd Earl of Leicester, and Juliana Whitbread (a daughter of Samuel Charles Whitbread). Together, they had six children:

- Alexander Edward Murray, 8th Earl of Dunmore (1871–1962), who married Lucinda Dorothea Kemble, daughter of Col. Horace William Kemble, in 1904.
- Lady Evelyn Murray (1867–1963), who married John Dupuis Cobbold, son of John Patteson Cobbold (MP for Ipswich), in 1891.
- Lady Muriel Murray (d. 1946), who married Harold Gore Browne, son of Col. Sir Thomas Gore Browne, in 1890.
- Lady Grace Murray (1873–1960), who married William James Barry, Esq. son of Sir Francis Barry, 1st Baronet, in 1896.
- Lady Victoria Alexandrina Murray (1877–1925), who died unmarried.
- Lady Mildred Murray (1878–1969), who married Brig.-Gen. Gilbert Burrell Spencer Follett in 1904. After his death in 1918, she married Sir John FitzGerald, 3rd Baronet, in 1919.

Lord Dunmore died at his house near Camberley on 27 August 1907, and was succeeded in his titles by his only son, Alexander.

== Works ==
- The Pamirs: Being a Narrative of a Year's Expedition on Horseback and on Foot Through Kashmir, Western Tibet, Chinese Tartary, and Russian Central Asia. J. Murray. 1894.
- The Revelation of Christianus and Other Christian Science Poems. University Press. 1901.

== Notes ==
Political offices
Preceded by The Earl of Breadalbane and Holland	Lord-in-waiting; 1874–1880	Succeeded by The Earl of Zetland
Honorary titles
Preceded by The Duke of Montrose	Lord Lieutenant of Stirlingshire; 1875–1885	Succeeded by The Duke of Montrose
Military offices
Vacant Title last held by The Duke of Clarence	Colonel of the 1st Volunteer Battalion of the Cameron Highlanders; 1896–1908	Succeeded by Sir John Ewart
Peerage of Scotland
Preceded by Alexander Murray	Earl of Dunmore; 1845–1907	Succeeded by Alexander Murray
