= Malcolm Murray, 12th Earl of Dunmore =

Australia-based Scottish peer

Malcolm Kenneth Murray, 12th Earl of Dunmore (born 17 September 1946 in Launceston, Tasmania) is an Australian-based Scottish peer who is a native-born Australian and lives in Tasmania. As well as holding the Earldom of Dunmore, Murray is also the Viscount of Fincastle and Lord of Blair, Moulin and Tillimet.

Murray inherited the earldom from his father, the 11th earl, who died in 1995. The earldom first came to Australia when his uncle, the 9th earl, moved to Tasmania in 1942. The title had passed to his father upon the death of his uncle (who had no sons) in 1982.

In 1998, he visited his ancestral home in Airth to plant a memorial tree beside the Dunmore Pineapple.

== Work and Activities ==
He has made one speech, both his maiden and final speech, in the House of Lords on 25 November 1998, less than one year before his automatic right to sit in the House of Lords was removed by the House of Lords Act 1999.

Murray studied at Launceston College, Tasmania and later worked as an Electrical Technical Officer for Airservices Australia. He has worked as an aerodrome technician in Devonport, Tasmania. In 2013, Murray officiated at the Clan Murray reunion in Dunedin.

He is the High Commissioner of Clan Murray in Australia. Dunmore is the Patron of the Scottish Australian Heritage Council, Crown International Dance Association, Australia Day Council (Victoria), The Company of Armigers Australia, The Armorial & Heraldry Society of Australia, Tasmanian Caledonian Council, The Murray Clan of Victoria, The Murray Clan of New Zealand, St Andrew's Society Tasmania, Tullibardine Pipe Band NSW, Co-Patron of St Andrew's First Aid Australia, The Murray Clan of Edinburgh, The Murray Clan Society of North America, Honorary member of the Murray Clan of NSW.

Dunmore is also an active Freemason being a Past Master of Concord Lodge No 10TC (1996) and Devonport Masonic Lodge No 90TC (2016&2017)in Tasmania, Patron of Lodge Phoenix No 92TC in Tasmania (2015), Patron and Past Master of Lodge Amalthea No 914VC in Victoria,(2011 and 2012). On 13 May 2018, Dunmore became the inaugural Worshipful Master of the newly consecretated ‘Earl of Dunmore Lodge Number 1686’ under the register of the United Grand Lodge of Victoria, Australia. Dunmore being the first peer of the realm to be installed as the foundation Worshipful Master of a Masonic lodge consecretated in the name of a peerage. The Earl of Dunmore Lodge is the only Masonic lodge under the jurisdiction of the United Grand Lodge of Victoria with dispensation to work its ceremonies and practices according to the ancients Scottish tradition.

== Personal life ==
Dunmore married Joy Partridge in 1970. They have two adopted children, Leigh and Elisa. The Countess of Dunmore died on 4 August 2015.

Peerage of Scotland
Preceded by Kenneth Randolph Murray	Earl of Dunmore; 1995–present	Incumbent; Heir: Hon. Geoffrey Charles Murray
