= Alexander Murray, 6th Earl of Dunmore =

British Army officer and peer (1804–1845)

The Right Honourable The Earl of Dunmore
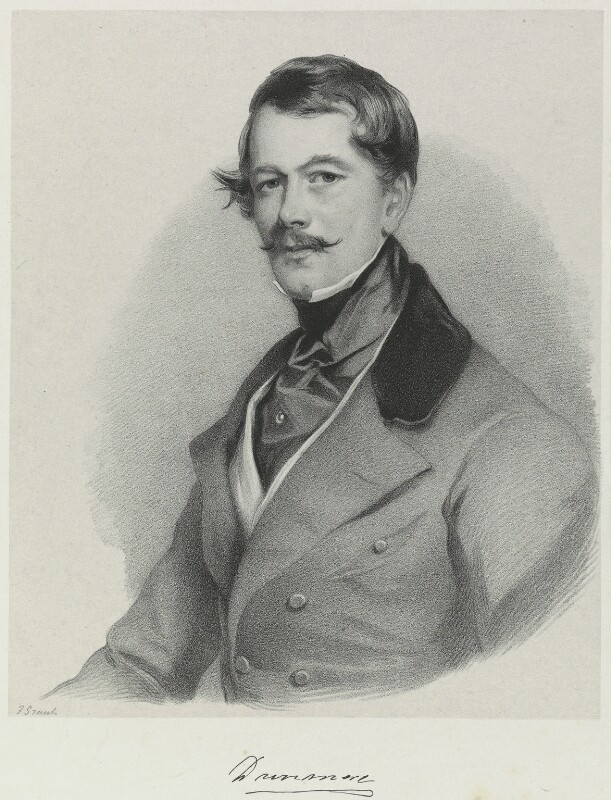
- Lithograph of Lord Dunmore, by Richard James Lane, 1846

Grand Master of the Grand Lodge of Scotland
- In office 1835–1836
- Preceded by: Marquess of Douglas
- Succeeded by: Lord Ramsay

Personal details
- Born: Alexander Edward Murray; 1 June 1804
- Died: 15 July 1845 (aged 41) Streatham
- Spouse: Lady Catherine Herbert (m. 1836–1845)
- Children: 4
- Parent(s): George Murray, 5th Earl of Dunmore; Lady Susan Hamilton

Alexander Edward Murray, 6th Earl of Dunmore (1 June 1804 – 15 July 1845) was a British Army officer and peer. He was the son of George Murray, 5th Earl of Dunmore.

== Early life ==
He was the son of George Murray, 5th Earl of Dunmore and Lady Susan Hamilton. He had two younger brothers, Hon. Sir Charles Augustus Murray, a prominent diplomat, and Hon. Henry Anthony Murray, a Rear Admiral in the Royal Navy.

His paternal grandparents were John Murray, 4th Earl of Dunmore, and Lady Charlotte Stewart (a daughter of the 6th Earl of Galloway). His maternal grandparents were Archibald Hamilton, 9th Duke of Hamilton and Lady Harriet Stewart (also a daughter of the 6th Earl of Galloway).

== Career ==
A Captain in the 9th Lancers, he served as aide-de-camp to Prince Adolphus, Duke of Cambridge.

Upon the death of his father on 11 November 1836, he succeeded as the 2nd Baron Dunmore, in the Peerage of the United Kingdom, which gave him an automatic seat in the House of Lords, as well as the 6th Viscount of Fincastle, 6th Earl of Dunmore, and 6th Lord Murray of Blair, Moulin, and Tillemot, all in the Peerage of Scotland. He inherited the Hebridean Isle of Harris, a 150,000 acre estate.

== Personal life ==
On 27 September 1836, Viscount Fincastle married Lady Catherine Herbert (1814–1886) at Frankfurt am Main, Germany. She was a daughter of Gen. George Herbert, 11th Earl of Pembroke and Catherine Vorontsov (the German spelling is Woronzow) (a daughter of Count Semyon Vorontsov, the Russian Ambassador to the United Kingdom). After their marriage, they lived in London where his wife became a Lady of the Bedchamber to Queen Victoria and their children had play dates at Buckingham Palace with the future Edward VII. Together, they had four children:

- Lady Susan Catherine Mary Murray (1837–1915), who married, as his second wife, James Carnegie, 9th Earl of Southesk, in 1860.
- Lady Constance Euphemia Woronzow Murray (1838–1922), who married William Elphinstone, 15th Lord Elphinstone, in 1864.
- Charles Adolphus Murray, 7th Earl of Dunmore (1841–1907), who married Lady Gertrude Coke, daughter of Thomas Coke, 2nd Earl of Leicester and Juliana Whitbread (a daughter of Samuel Charles Whitbread), in 1866.
- Lady Victoria Alexandrina Murray (1845–1911), who married, as his second wife, Rev. Henry Cunliffe, son of Sir Robert Cunliffe, 4th Baronet.

Lord Dunmore died at his residence at Streatham on 15 July 1845, and was succeeded in his titles by his only son, Charles.

Masonic offices
Preceded by Marquess of Douglas	Grand Master of the Grand Lodge of Scotland; 1835–1836	Succeeded by Lord Ramsay
Peerage of Scotland
Preceded by George Murray	Earl of Dunmore; 1836–1845	Succeeded by Charles Murray
