= Earl of Dunmore =

Peerage of Scotland title

Earldom of Dunmore
- Creation date: 1686
- Created by: James VII
- Peerage: Peerage of Scotland
- First holder: Charles Murray, 1st Earl of Dunmore
- Present holder: Malcolm Murray, 12th Earl of Dunmore
- Heir presumptive: Geoffrey Charles Murray
- Remainder to: heirs male of the body of the grantee
- Subsidiary titles: Viscount of Fincastle; Baron Dunmore (1831–1980); Lord Murray of Blair, Moulin and Tillimet

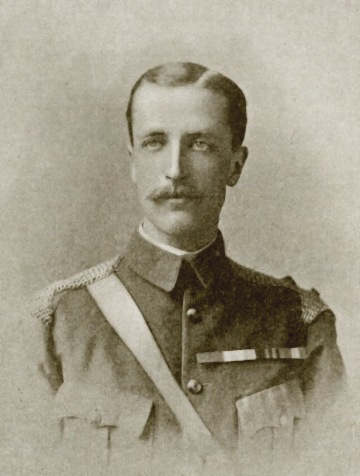
Alexander Murray, 8th Earl of Dunmore, VC, DSO, MVO, DL

Earl of Dunmore is a title in the Peerage of Scotland.

The title Earl of Dunmore was created in 1686 for Lord Charles Murray, son of John Murray, 1st Marquess of Atholl. The title passed down through generations, with various earls serving in the House of Lords as Scottish Representative Peers and holding other political positions. The 4th Earl was a colonial governor in New York, Virginia, and the Bahamas, while the 5th Earl bought the Estate of Harris in 1834. The 7th Earl served under Benjamin Disraeli and was the Lord Lieutenant of Stirlingshire. The 8th Earl received the Victoria Cross and held political office as Captain of the Honourable Corps of Gentlemen-at-Arms. The barony of Dunmore became extinct after the 9th Earl's death in 1980, but the other titles passed to his distant relatives in Tasmania, Australia. The family seat was located at Amhuinnsuidhe Castle on the Isle of Harris and Dunmore Tower near Falkirk.

== History ==
The title was created in 1686 for Lord Charles Murray, second son of John Murray, 1st Marquess of Atholl. He was made Lord Murray of Blair, Moulin and Tillimet (or Tullimet) and Viscount of Fincastle at the same time, also in the Peerage of Scotland. He was succeeded by his son, the second Earl. He was a General in the Army and sat in the House of Lords as a Scottish representative peer from 1713 to 1715 and from 1727 to 1752. His younger brother, William Murray, later to become the third Earl, was involved in the Jacobite rising of 1745 and was tried for high treason in 1746. Murray pleaded guilty but received a pardon from King George II and succeeded to the peerages when his brother died unmarried six years later.

The third Earl was succeeded by his son. The fourth Earl was a Scottish Representative Peer in the House of Lords from 1761 to 1774 and from 1776 to 1790 and served as colonial governor of New York, Virginia and the Bahamas. His tenure as governor of the New York and Virginia colonies was to end with the start of the American Revolution. Lord Dunmore's eldest son, the fifth Earl, briefly represented Liskeard in the House of Commons. In 1831 he was created Baron Dunmore, of Dunmore in the Forest of Athole in the County of Perth, in the Peerage of the United Kingdom, which gave him and his descendants a permanent seat in the House of Lords.

George Murray, 5th Earl of Dunmore, bought the Estate of Harris from Alexander Norman Macleod for £60,000 in 1834. In 1839, the people of South Harris were ejected from their homes by armed soldiers and a posse of Glasgow policemen acting on orders from the government, at the behest of the Earl of Dunmore. The 6th Earl of Dunmore, Alexander Edward Murray, had inherited Harris upon the death of his father on 11 November 1836 and would in turn be succeeded by his son, Charles Adolphus, following the 6th Earl's death on 14 July 1845. Thus the 6th Earl was about halfway through his proprietorship of the island when he was providing a pound per person for those electing to leave.

The seventh Earl of Dunmore served as a Lord-in-waiting (government whip in the House of Lords) in the second Conservative administration of Benjamin Disraeli and was also Lord Lieutenant of Stirlingshire. The 7th Earl relinquished ownership of the North Harris Estate to his bankers, in particular the Scott family. He was succeeded by his son, the eighth Earl. He was a soldier and was awarded the Victoria Cross in 1897. Lord Dunmore later held political office as Captain of the Honourable Corps of Gentlemen-at-Arms (government chief whip in the House of Lords). On the death in 1980 of his grandson, the ninth Earl, the line of the fifth Earl failed and the barony of Dunmore became extinct.

The late Earl was succeeded by his distant relative (his fourth cousin once removed), the tenth Earl. He was the great-great-grandson of the Hon. Alexander Murray, second son of the fourth Earl, and lived in Tasmania, Australia. As of 2017 the titles are held by his nephew, the twelfth Earl, who succeeded his father in 1995. He also lives in Tasmania, Australia and is a well respected Freemason.

As a male-line descendant of the first Marquess of Atholl he is also in remainder to this peerage and its subsidiary titles and by special remainder to the Dukedom, which are now held by his kinsman Bruce Murray, 12th Duke of Atholl.

The family seat was Amhuinnsuidhe Castle, on the Isle of Harris and Dunmore Tower, near Airth, Falkirk.

== Earls of Dunmore (1686) ==
1. Charles Murray, 1st Earl of Dunmore (1661–1710)
2. John Murray, 2nd Earl of Dunmore (1685–1752)
3. William Murray, 3rd Earl of Dunmore (1696–1756)
4. John Murray, 4th Earl of Dunmore (1730–1809)
5. George Murray, 5th Earl of Dunmore (1762–1836)
6. Alexander Edward Murray, 6th Earl of Dunmore (1804–1845)
7. Charles Adolphus Murray, 7th Earl of Dunmore (1841–1907)
8. Alexander Edward Murray, 8th Earl of Dunmore (1871–1962)
9. John Alexander Murray, 9th Earl of Dunmore (1939–1980)
10. Reginald Arthur Murray, 10th Earl of Dunmore (1911–1981)
11. Kenneth Randolph Murray, 11th Earl of Dunmore (1913–1995)
12. Malcolm Kenneth Murray, 12th Earl of Dunmore (b. 1946)

The heir presumptive is the present holder's brother Hon. Geoffrey Charles Murray (b. 1949).
The heir presumptive's heir presumptive is his first cousin Stephen Alexander Murray (b. 1953).
The heir presumptive's heir presumptive's heir apparent is his son, Anthony Victor Murray (b. 1989).

== Family tree ==
Family tree of Dukes, Marquesses, and Earls of Atholl, Earls of Derby (3rd Stanley family creation), and Earls of Dunmore

John Lestrange III d. 1269
Baron Strange (1st creation), of Salop, 1295
John Lestrange IV d. 1276	Roger le Strange d. 1311; 1st Baron Strange of Salop
Baron Strange (1st creation), of Salop extinct, 1311
Baron Strange (2nd creation), of Knockyn, 1295
John Le Strange V d. 1309; 1st Baron Strange of Knockyn
Baron Mohun of Dunster, 1299
John Le Strange VI c. 1282–1311; 2nd Baron Strange of Knockyn	John de Mohun d. 1330; 1st Baron Mohun
John Le Strange c. 1297–1323; 3rd Baron Strange of Knockyn	Roger Le Strange; 1301–1349; 4th Baron Strange of Knockyn	John de Mohun d. 1322
Earl of Atholl (4th creation), 1367
Roger Le Strange c. 1327–1382; 5th Baron Strange of Knockyn	John Mohun; 1320–1376; 2nd Baron Mohun	Robert Stewart; 1316–1390; 1st Earl of Atholl, Earl of Strathearn, Later King Robert II
Earl of Atholl (6th creation), 1403	Earl of Atholl (7th creation), 1404
John Beaufort c. 1373–1410; Earl of Somerset	John Le Strange c. 1350–1397; 6th Baron Strange of Knockyn	Maud Mohun	John Stewart c. 1337–1406; 2nd Earl of Atholl, Earl of Carrick, Later King Robert III	Robert Stewart; 1340–1420; Duke of Albany, Earl of Atholl	Walter Stewart c. 1360–1437; Earl of Atholl, Earl of Strathearn, Earl of Caithness
Earldom of Atholl (4th creation) merged in the crown, 1390	Earldom of Atholl (6th creation) expired, 1406	Earldom of Atholl (7th creation) attainted, 1404
Baron Stanley, 1456	Earl of Atholl (5th creation), 1398
John Beaufort; 1401–1444; Duke of Somerset	Thomas Stanley c. 1405–1459; 1st Baron Stanley, King of Mann	Richard Le Strange; 1381–1449; 7th Baron Strange of Knockyn, 3rd Baron Mohun	James Stewart "Black Knight of Lorn"; 1399–c. 1451	Joan Beaufort c. 1404–1445	James I 1394–1437; King of Scots	David Stewart; 1378–1402; Duke of Rothesay, Earl of Atholl, Earl of Carrick
Earldom of Atholl (5th creation) extinct, 1402
Earl of Derby (3rd creation), 1485	Earl of Atholl (8th creation), c. 1457; Lord of Balveny, 1460
Margaret Beaufort; 1443–1509	Thomas Stanley; 1435–1504; 1st Earl of Derby, 2nd Baron Stanley, King of Mann	John Le Strange c. 1440–1477; 8th Baron Strange of Knockyn	John Stewart c. 1437–1442–1512; 1st Earl of Atholl
Henry VII; 1457–1509	George Stanley; 1460–1503; 9th Baron Strange of Knockyn suo uxoris	Joan Le Strange c. 1460–1514; 9th Baroness Strange of Knockyn suo jure	John Stewart c. 1480–c. 1521; 2nd Earl of Atholl
Mary Tudor; 1496–1533	Thomas Stanley; 1504–1521; 2nd Earl of Derby, 10th Baron Strange of Knockyn, 3rd Baron Stanley, King of Mann	John Stewart; 1507–1542; 3rd Earl of Atholl
Eleanor Brandon; 1519–1547	Edward Stanley c. 1509–1572; 3rd Earl of Derby, 11th Baron Strange of Knockyn, 4th Baron Stanley, Lord of Mann	John Stewart "the fair" d. 1579; 4th Earl of Atholl
Earl of Atholl (9th creation), 1596	Lord Murray of Tullibardine, 1604, Earl of Tullibardine (1st creation) and Lord Murray, Gask and Balquhidder, 1606
Margaret Clifford; 1540–1596	Henry Stanley; 1531–1593; 4th Earl of Derby, 12th Baron Strange of Knockyn, 5th Baron Stanley, Lord of Mann	John Stewart; 1566–1603; 1st Earl of Atholl, 6th Lord Innermeath	Marie Ruthven (d. after 1605)	John Stewart; 1563–1595; 5th Earl of Atholl	John Murray (c. 1550 – c. 1609); 1st Earl of Tullibardine, etc.
Earldom of Atholl (8th creation) extinct, 1595
Earl of Tullibardine (2nd creation), 1628
Ferdinando Stanley; 1559–1594; 5th Earl of Derby, 13th Baron Strange of Knockyn, 6th Baron Stanley, Lord of Mann	William Stanley; 1561–1642; 6th Earl of Derby, Lord of Mann	James Stewart d. 1625; 2nd Earl of Atholl	Dorothea Stewart	William Murray c. 1574–1627; 2nd Earl of Tullibardine, etc.	Patrick Murray; 1578–1644; 1st Earl of Tullibardine, etc.
Barony of Strange of Knockyn (9th creation) abeyant, 1594	Earldom of Atholl (9th creation) extinct, 1625	Resigned Earldom of Tullibardine and lordships in favour of his brother, 1626
Elizabeth Stanley; 1588–1633
Baron Strange (4th creation), 1628	Earl of Atholl (10th creation), 1629
Ferdinando Hastings; 1608–1655; 6th Earl of Huntingdon and Baron Hastings	James Stanley; 1607–1651; 7th Earl of Derby, 1st Baron Strange (4th creation)	John Murray c. 1610–1642; 1st Earl of Atholl	James Murray; 1617–1670; 2nd Earl of Tullibardine, etc.
Marquess of Atholl, Viscount of Balquhidder, and Lord Murray, Balveny and Gask, 1676
Charles Stanley; 1628–1672; 8th Earl of Derby, 2nd Baron Strange (4th creation)	Amelia Ann Sophia Stanley; 1633–1702/03	John Murray; 1631–1703; 1st Marquess of Atholl, etc., 2nd Earl of Atholl, 3rd Earl of Tullibardine, etc.
Earl of Tullibardine, Viscount Glenalmond and Lord Murray, 1696 (for life); Duke of Atholl, Marquess of Tullibardine, Earl of Strathtay and Strathardle, Viscount of Balwhidder, Glenalmond and Glenlyon, Lord Murray, Balveny and Gask, 1703	Earl of Dunmore, Viscount of Fincastle, Lord Murray of Blair, Moulin and Tillimet, 1686
Theophilus Hastings; 1650–1701; 7th Earl of Huntingdon and Baron Hastings	William Richard George Stanley c. 1655–1702; 9th Earl of Derby, 3rd Baron Strange (4th creation)	James Stanley; 1664–1736; 10th Earl of Derby, 6th Baron Strange (4th creation)	John Murray; 1660–1724; 1st Duke of Atholl, etc., 2nd Marquess of Atholl, etc., Earl of Tullibardine and Viscount Glenalmond and Lord Murray	Charles Murray; 1661–1710; 1st Earl of Dunmore, etc.
Theophilus Hastings; 1696–1747; 9th Earl of Huntingdon and Baron Hastings	Henrietta Stanley; 1687–1718; 4th Baroness Strange (4th creation)	William Murray; 1689–1746 styled Marquess of Tullibardine	James Murray; 1690–1764; 2nd Duke of Atholl, etc., 7th Baron Strange (4th creation)	George Murray; 1694–1760	John Murray; 1685–1752; 2nd Earl of Dunmore, etc.	William Murray; 1696–1756; 3rd Earl of Dunmore, etc.
Attainted and excluded from succession	Attainted and excluded from succession
Elizabeth Rawdon; 1731–1808; 16th Baroness Botreaux, 15th Baroness Hungerford, 13th Baroness de Moleyns, 13th Baroness Hastings	John Rawdon; 1720–1793; 1st Earl of Moira, 2nd Baron Rawdon, 4th Rawdon Baronet	Henrietta Ashburnham c. 1716–1732; 5th Baroness Strange (4th creation)	Charlotte Murray; 1731–1805; 8th Baroness Strange (4th creation)	John Murray; 1729–1774; 3rd Duke of Atholl	John Murray; 1730–1809; 4th Earl of Dunmore, etc.
Earl Strange and Baron Murray of Stanley, 1786	Baron Dunmore, 1831
Francis Rawdon-Hastings; 1754–1826; 1st Marquess of Hastings, 2nd Earl of Moira, 3rd Baron Rawdon, 5th Rawdon Baronet	Flora Mure-Campbell; 1780–1840; 6th Countess of Loudoun	John Murray; 1755–1830; 4th Duke of Atholl, etc., 1st Earl Strange, etc., 9th Baron Strange (4th creation)	George Murray; 1761–1803	George Murray; 1762–1836; 5th Earl of Dunmore, etc., 1st Baron Dunmore	Alexander Murray; 1764–1842
Baron Glenlyon
George Augustus Francis Rawdon-Hastings; 1808–1844; 2nd Marquess of Hastings; 3rd Earl of Moira; Earl of Rawdon, 4th Baron Rawdon	Barbara Rawdon-Hastings; 1810–1858; 20th Baroness Grey de Ruthyn	Charlotte Murray; 1775–1832 m. Adam Drummond of Megginch	John Murray; 1778–1846; 5th Duke of Atholl, etc., 2nd Earl Strange, etc., 10th Baron Strange (4th creation)	James Murray; 1782–1837; 1st Baron Glenlyon	George Murray; 1784–1860
Edith Maud Rawdon-Hastings; 1833–1874; 10th Countess of Loudoun	John Drummond; 1803–1889	George Augustus Frederick John Murray; 1814–1864; 6th Duke of Atholl, etc., 3rd Earl Strange, etc., 11th Baron Strange (4th creation), 2nd Baron Glenlyon	George Edward Murray; 1818–1854	Alexander Edward Murray; 1804–1845; 6th Earl of Dunmore, etc., 2nd Baron Dunmore	Virginius Murray; 1817–1861
Paulyn Francis Cuthbert Rawdon-Hastings; 1856–1907	Malcolm Drummond; 1856–1924	John James Hugh Henry Stewart-Murray; 1840–1917; 7th Duke of Atholl, etc., 4th Earl Strange, etc., 12th Baron Strange (4th creation), 3rd Baron Glenlyon	George Herbert Murray; 1849–1936	Douglas Stuart Murray; 1853–1920	Charles Adolphus Murray; 1841–1907; 7th Earl of Dunmore, etc., 3rd Baron Dunmore	Reginald Murray; 1846–1925
Baron Stanley abeyance ended, 1921	Baron Strange of Knockyn abeyance ended, 1921
Edith Abney-Hastings; 1883–1960; 12th Countess of Loudoun; Baroness Botreaux, Baroness Hastings, 7th Baroness Stanley	Elizabeth Philipps Abney-Hastings; 1884–1974; 22nd Baroness Hungerford, 20th Baroness de Moleyns, 14th Baroness Strange of Knockyn	John George Stewart-Murray; 1871–1942; 8th Duke of Atholl, etc., 5th Earl Strange, etc., 13th Baron Strange (4th creation), 4th Baron Glenlyon	James Thomas Stewart-Murray; 1879–1957; 9th Duke of Atholl, etc., 6th Earl Strange, etc., 14th Baron Strange (4th creation), 5th Baron Glenlyon	George Evelyn Pemberton Murray; 1880–1947	George Murray; 1884–1940	Alexander Edward Murray; 1871–1962; 8th Earl of Dunmore, etc., 4th Baron Dunmore	Arthur Charles Murray; 1882–1964
Earldom of Strange and Baronies of Murray and Glenlyon extinct and Barony of Strange abeyant, 1957
Baron Strange (4th creation) abeyance terminated, 1965
Jestyn Reginald Austin Plantagenet Philipps; 1917–1991; 2nd Viscount St Davids, 23rd Baron Hungerford, 21st Baron de Moleyns, 15th Baron Strange of Knockyn	John Drummond; 1900–1982; 15th Baron Strange (4th creation)	George Anthony Murray; 1907–1945	Edward David Murray; 1908–1940 styled Viscount Fincastle	Reginald Arthur Murray; 1911–1981; 10th Earl of Dunmore, etc.	Kenneth Randolph Murray; 1913–1995; 11th Earl of Dunmore, etc.
Baron Strange (4th creation) abeyant, 1982–1986
Colwyn Iestyn John Philipps; 1939–2009; 3rd Viscount St Davids, 24th Baron Hungerford, 22nd Baron de Moleyns, 16th Baron Strange of Knockyn	Jean Cherry Drummond; 1928–2008; 16th Baroness Strange (4th creation)	George Iain Murray; 1931–1996; 10th Duke of Atholl, etc.	John Murray; 1929–2012; 11th Duke of Atholl, etc.	John Alexander Murray; 1939–1980; 9th Earl of Dunmore, etc., 5th Baron Dunmore
Barony Dunmore extinct, 1980
Rhodri Colwyn Philipps b. 1966; 4th Viscount St Davids, 25th Baron Hungerford, 23rd Baron de Moleyns, 17th Baron Strange of Knockyn	Roland Augusto Jestyn Estanislao Philipps b. 1970	Adam Humphrey Drummond b. 1953; 17th Baron Strange (4th creation)	Bruce George Ronald Murray b. 1960; 12th Duke of Atholl, etc.	Malcolm Kenneth Murray b. 1946; 12th Earl of Dunmore, etc.	Geoffrey Charles Murray b. 1949
Heir presumptive to the Viscouncy St Davids, Barony Hungerford, Barony de Moleyns, and Barony of Strange of Knockyn	Heir presumptive to the Earldom of Dunmore
John Adam Humphrey Drummond b. 1992	Michael Bruce John Murray b. 1985 styled Marquess of Tullibardine	David Nicholas George Murray b. 1986
Heir apparent to the Barony of Strange (4th creation)	Heir apparent to the Dukedom of Atholl

== See also ==
- Duke of Atholl
- Lady Augusta Murray
- Sir Charles Murray
- Baron Dunmore
