= William Elphinstone, 15th Lord Elphinstone =

Scottish Conservative politician

The Right Honourable The Lord Elphinstone
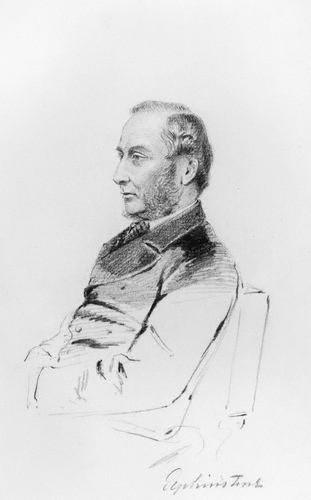
- The 1st Baron Elphinstone by Frederick Sargent.
- Born: William Buller Elphinstone; 18 November 1828
- Died: 18 January 1893 (aged 64)
- Spouse: Lady Constance Euphemia Murray (m. 1864)
- Parent(s): James Drummond Fullerton Elphinstone; Anna Maria Buller Elphinstone
- Relatives: William Fullerton Elphinstone (grandfather); Sir Edward Buller, 1st Baronet (grandfather)

William Buller Fullerton Elphinstone, 15th Lord Elphinstone and 1st Baron Elphinstone (18 November 1828 – 18 January 1893), known as William Elphinstone until 1861, was a Scottish Conservative politician.

== Early life ==
Elphinstone was born on 18 November 1828. He was the son of Lieutenant-Colonel James Drummond Fullerton Elphinstone (1788–1857) and his second wife, Anna Maria (née Buller) Elphinstone, who married on 25 February 1824. His father was previously married to Diana-Maria Clavering, who died Christmas Eve of 1821.

His father was the fourth son of the Hon. William Elphinstone, himself the third son of Charles Elphinstone, 10th Lord Elphinstone. His paternal uncle was Major-General William George Keith Elphinstone. His mother was the only daughter of Vice-Admiral Sir Edward Buller and Gertrude van Cortlandt (descendant of Stephanus Van Cortlandt, the Schuyler family and the de Peyster family from British North America).

== Career ==
He served as a midshipman on HMS Grampus from 1845 to 1847.

He succeeded his second cousin in the lordship in 1861 and was elected a Scottish representative peer in 1867. Elphinstone served as a Lord-in-waiting (government whip in the House of Lords) under Benjamin Disraeli from 1874 to 1880 and under Lord Salisbury from 1885 to 1886 and from 1886 to 1889. In 1885, he was created Baron Elphinstone, of Elphinstone in the County of Haddington, in the Peerage of the United Kingdom.

In February 1885, he spent three weeks in Victoria in south-eastern Australia with the English historian James Anthony Froude and his son, Ashley Anthony Froude. In March 1885 he accompanied the Froudes to New Zealand where they visited the Pink & White Terraces at Tarawera and stayed with Sir George Grey on Kawarau Island. During his travels, Lord Elphinstone kept a portfolio of sketches which the elder Froude used when he published Oceana, or, England and Her Colonies in 1886.

== Personal life ==
Lord Elphinstone married Lady Constance Euphemia Murray (1838–1922), daughter of Alexander Murray, 6th Earl of Dunmore, in 1864. Among her siblings were Lady Susan Murray, Charles Murray, 7th Earl of Dunmore, and Lady Victoria Alexandrina (wife of Rev. Henry Cunliffe, a son of Sir Robert Cunliffe, 4th Baronet). Together, they were the parents of five children, only one of whom married:

- James Drummond Elphinstone (1865–1890), who died unmarried.
- The Hon. Lilian Elphinstone (1867–1956), who died unmarried.
- Sidney Elphinstone, 16th Lord Elphinstone (1869–1955), who married Lady Mary Bowes-Lyon, the daughter of Claude Bowes-Lyon, 14th Earl of Strathmore and Kinghorne and Cecilia Cavendish-Bentinck and the sister of Queen Elizabeth The Queen Mother.
- Hon. Mountstuart William Elphinstone (1871–1957), who served as Private Secretary to the Military Secretary, War Office during the World War I and who died unmarried.
- Hon. Constance Lothian Elphinstone (1873–1895), who died unmarried.

He died in January 1893, aged 64, and was succeeded in his titles by his eldest surviving son Sidney. Lady Elphinstone died in March 1922, and lived in Pinewood, Windlesham, Surrey.

== Notes ==
Peerage of Scotland
Preceded by John Elphinstone-Fleeming	Lord Elphinstone; 1861–1893	Succeeded by Sidney Herbert Elphinstone
Peerage of the United Kingdom
New creation	Baron Elphinstone; 1885–1893	Succeeded by Sidney Herbert Elphinstone
