= Dunmore (surname) =

Dummore is a surname. Notable people with the surname include:

- Dave Dunmore (1934–2021), English footballer
- Fred Dunmore (1911–1991), English footballer
- Helen Dunmore (1952–2017), British author
- John Dunmore (1923–2023), New Zealand historian and playwright
- Laurence Dunmore, British graphic designer and film director
- Makenzie Dunmore (born 1997), American sprinter
- Russell G. Dunmore (1884–1935), American politician
- Tom Dunmore, British journalist
