= Sir George Stirling, 9th Baronet =

Scottish army officer

Colonel Sir George Murray Home Stirling, 9th Baronet CBE DSO (4 September 1869 – 1 May 1949) was a Scottish British Army officer who was Lord Lieutenant of Stirlingshire from 1936 until 1949.

== Background ==
Stirling was the son of Sir Charles Stirling, 8th Baronet (1831–1910) by his wife Anna Georgina Murray (d.1924), daughter of James Murray. He was educated at Eton and the Royal Military College, Sandhurst.

He succeeded his father as Baronet, of Glorat, Stirlingshire, in 1910. The baronetcy had been created in the Baronetage of Nova Scotia in 1666.

Stirling was commissioned as a Deputy Lord-Lieutenant of Stirlingshire in June 1915 and became Lord-Lieutenant from 29 October 1936 until his death on 1 May 1949. He was also Keeper of Dumbarton Castle, a Justice of the Peace and a member of the King's Bodyguard for Scotland.

Stirling was appointed Commander to the Military Division of the Order of the British Empire (CBE) for "valuable service rendered in connection with military operations in France" in the 1919 Birthday Honours.

== Military career ==
Stirling was commissioned a second lieutenant in the 2nd Essex Regiment (56th Foot) on 9 November 1889, and was promoted to lieutenant on 7 October 1892. He served in British India, where he was a transport officer in the Chitral Relief Force under Major-General Sir Robert Low in 1895, then transport officer in the Tirah Campaign on the North-West Frontier 1897–98.

Stirling served in the Second Boer War in South Africa throughout the war from 1899 until 1902. He was promoted captain on 29 January 1900. He took part in operations in the Orange Free State March to May 1900, including the battles of Poplar Grove, Driefontein and Sanna's Post (March 1900), Houtnek, Vet River and Zand River (May 1900); then took part in operations in Transvaal May and June 1900, including actions near Johannesburg, Pretoria and the battle of Diamond Hill (June 1900). Appointed adjutant of the Burma Mounted Infantry on 15 June 1900, he saw further action in the Orange River Colony and the Transvaal until October 1900, during which he was slightly wounded (26 September 1900).

He served as Staff Captain at Mounted Infantry Headquarters from 18 October 1900 until 19 February 1902, when he was attached to the Royal Army Service Corps as Officer Commanding Transport in the Bloemfontein district. The war ended with the Peace of Vereeniging in June 1902, and he stepped down from his command on 21 August, leaving Cape Town for the United Kingdom on the SS Scot the following month.

For his service in the war, he was mentioned in despatches, received the Queen's South Africa Medal with four clasps and King's South Africa Medal with two clasps, and was appointed a Companion of the Distinguished Service Order (DSO).

Stirling served in the Somaliland campaign, commanding the 7th Somali Camel Corps from 12 November 1903 to June 1904, for which he received the Africa General Service Medal and clasp.

He was appointed Deputy Assistant Adjutant General, Mhow Division, India in January 1911, and promoted major in February 1912. He vacated this appointment in November 1914 to rejoin his regiment in France after the outbreak of World War I. He was appointed provost marshal to the 5th Army Corps in December 1914 and then promoted temporary lieutenant colonel in November 1915, when he was given command of the 2nd Essex Regiment. Stirling was promoted temporary colonel and served as Commandant, Lines of Communication, British Armies in France from October 1918.

Stirling was wounded and mentioned in despatches three times (in 1915, 1917 and 1918) during the course of the war. He was promoted brevet lieutenant colonel in January 1918 and full lieutenant colonel in June 1924.

On retirement, Stirling took command of the 9th battalion of Argyll and Sutherland Highlanders Territorial Army.

== Family ==
In November 1904, Stirling married Mabel Elizabeth Sprot (1883–1983), daughter of Sir Alexander Sprot, 1st Baronet.

Lady Stirling was a Justice of the Peace and was made an Officer of the Order of the British Empire (OBE) in the 1939 Birthday Honours for "public and social services in Stirlingshire" and a Commander of the Order of the British Empire (CBE) in the 1946 New Year Honours for her work with the British Red Cross.

A glass negative of a photograph of Lady Stirling from 1921 is held in the archives of the National Portrait Gallery.

A biography of Lady Stirling was published in the 104th edition of the Scottish Red Cross News magazine in 1945.

The couple had five children.

- Elizabeth Gloriana (b. 27 February 1906) – Baptised Bangalore, India
- Jean Margaret (28 August 1908 – 23 January 2008)
- Charles Alexander Sprot Home (3 April 1910 – 19 June 1938) – Died in a yachting accident
- George Archibald Mungo (10 March 1915 – 14 December 1941) – Died of wounds received at Tobruk. Posthumously awarded a Military Cross
- Marjorie Marigold Ann (12 February 1920 – 20 April 2018)

With the premature deaths of his sons, the baronetcy became dormant on the death of Sir George, as the possible American heirs failed to claim it.

Honorary titles
| Preceded by William Laurence Pullar | Lord Lieutenant of Stirlingshire; 1936–1949 | Succeeded by Sir Ian Bolton, 2nd Baronet |
Baronetage of Nova Scotia
| Preceded by Charles Stirling | Baronet (of Gloat, Stirlingshire); 1910–1949 | Succeeded by Dormant |
