= Tom Dunmore =

Freelance journalist

Tom Dunmore is the former editor-in-chief of Stuff magazine and a freelance journalist. Dunmore was previously the editor of Rip n Burn, the United Kingdom's first magazine dedicated to download culture.

== Career ==
After studying film and literature at the University of Warwick in the early 1990s, Dunmore began his career in journalism as a television listings sub-editor for the Press Association. In 1999, after five years doing listings, Dunmore joined Haymarket Publishing's Stuff as a sub-editor. He took over as editor in 2002.
