= Lord Lieutenant of Stirlingshire =

Ceremonial officer in Stirlingshire, Scotland

This is a list of people who served as Lord Lieutenant of Stirlingshire in Scotland. The office was abolished in 1975, and replaced with the Lord Lieutenant of Stirling and Falkirk.

- David Erskine, 9th Earl of Buchan 1713 – 1715
- incomplete before 1794
- James Graham, 3rd Duke of Montrose 17 March 1794 – 30 December 1836
- George Abercromby, 2nd Baron Abercromby 19 January 1837 – 15 February 1843
- James Graham, 4th Duke of Montrose 27 February 1843 – 30 December 1874
- Charles Murray, 7th Earl of Dunmore 16 February 1875 – 1885
- Douglas Graham, 5th Duke of Montrose 18 July 1885 – 10 December 1925
- George Younger, 1st Viscount Younger of Leckie 14 January 1926 – 29 April 1929
- William Laurence Pullar 15 November 1929 – 1936
- Sir George Stirling, 9th Baronet 29 October 1936 – 1 May 1949
- Sir Ian Bolton, 2nd Baronet 8 July 1949 – 1964
- Edward Younger, 3rd Viscount Younger of Leckie 24 February 1964 – 1975
- Younger of Leckie became Lord Lieutenant of Stirling and Falkirk
