= Bill Dinsmore =

Australian rules footballer

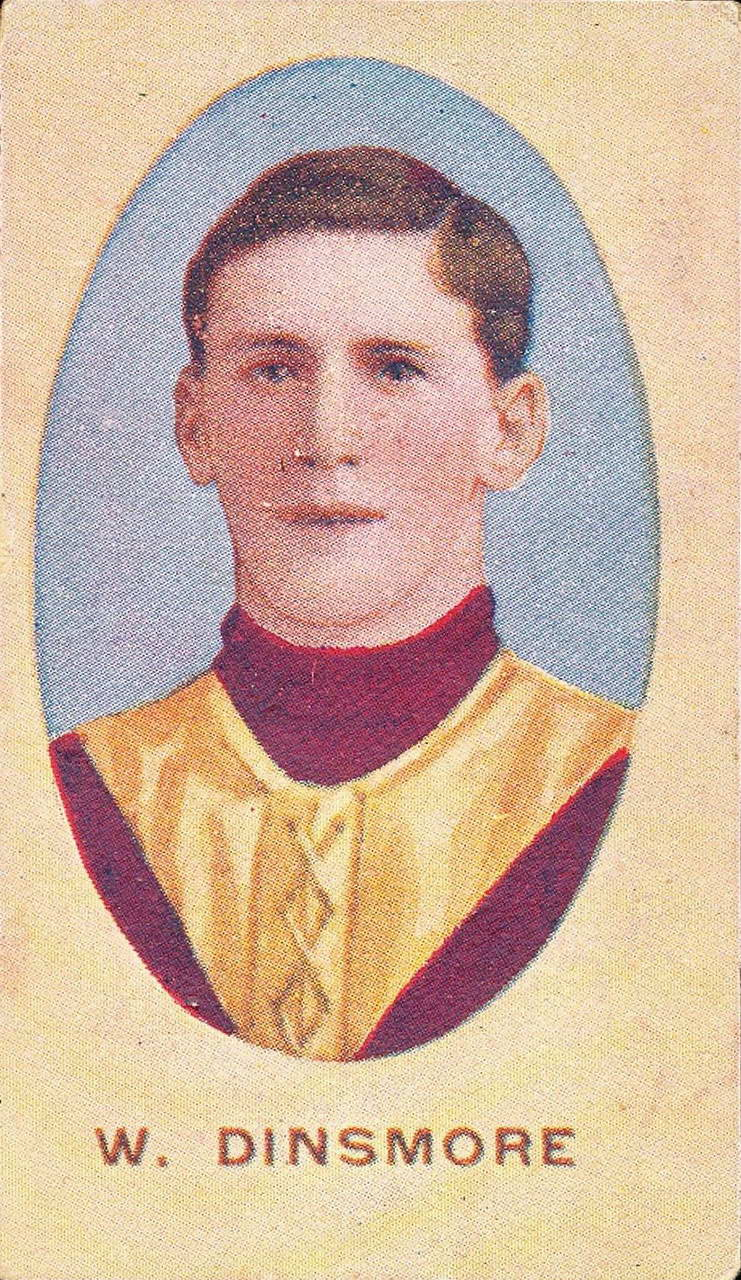
- Cigarette card of Dinsmore in 1910

Personal information
- Full name: William Henry Dinsmore
- Born: 14 February 1887; Prahran, Victoria
- Died: 11 November 1967 (aged 80); Croydon, Victoria
- Original team: Wesley College
- Position: Forward

Playing career^{1}
Years	Club	Games (Goals)
1908–09	Fitzroy	19 (13)
1914–15	Essendon	13 (17)
1915	St Kilda	1 (0)
Total		33 (30)
- ^{1} Playing statistics correct to the end of 1915.

William Henry Dinsmore (14 February 1887 – 11 November 1967) was an Australian rules footballer who played with Fitzroy, Essendon and St Kilda in the Victorian Football League (VFL).
