= George Murray, 5th Earl of Dunmore =

British politician

The Right Honourable The Earl of Dunmore FRSE

Member of Parliament for Liskeard
- In office 1801–1802 Serving with John Eliot
- Preceded by: Parliament of Great Britain
- Succeeded by: John Eliot; William Eliot
- In office 1800–1801 Serving with John Eliot
- Preceded by: John Eliot; The Earl of Inchiquin
- Succeeded by: Parliament of the United Kingdom

Personal details
- Born: George Murray; 30 April 1762
- Died: 11 November 1836 (aged 74)
- Spouse: Lady Susan Hamilton (m. 1803; died 1836)
- Children: Alexander Murray, 6th Earl of Dunmore; Sir Charles Murray; Henry Anthony Murray
- Parent(s): John Murray, 4th Earl of Dunmore; Lady Charlotte Stewart

George Murray, 5th Earl of Dunmore FRSE (30 April 1762 – 11 November 1836), known as Viscount of Fincastle until 1809, was a Scottish peer.

== Early life ==
Murray was the eldest son of John Murray, 4th Earl of Dunmore, and Lady Charlotte (née Stewart). Among his siblings were Lady Catherine Murray (wife of MP Hon. Edward Bouverie, a son of the 1st Earl of Radnor), and Lady Augusta Murray (who married Prince Augustus Frederick, son of King George III).

His paternal grandparents were William Murray, 3rd Earl of Dunmore (a nephew of the 2nd Earl of Dunmore) and Catherine Nairne. His father joined the ill-fated Rising of "Bonnie Prince Charlie" and was appointed as a page to Prince Charles. His maternal grandparents were Alexander Stewart, 6th Earl of Galloway and Lady Catherine Cochrane (the youngest daughter of the 4th Earl of Dundonald).

He matriculated at Christ Church, Oxford in 1778.

== Career ==
As Lord Fincastle, a courtesy title afforded to him as the heir to the earldom of Dunmore, he was returned to the House of Commons for Liskeard in 1800, on the interest of Lord Eliot, a seat he held until 1802. He succeeded his father in the earldom in 1809. For his support of the Whigs, he was created Baron Dunmore, of Dunmore in the Forest of Athole in the County of Perth, in the Peerage of the United Kingdom, in 1831 which gave him an automatic seat in the House of Lords.

He served as Lieutenant of the Middlesex Yeomanry in 1803 and Lieutenant-Colonel of the Haytor Volunteer Infantry, also in 1803.

== Personal life ==
On 3 August 1803, Lord Dunmore married his first cousin, Lady Susan Hamilton (1774–1846), a daughter of Archibald Hamilton, 9th Duke of Hamilton and Lady Harriet Stewart (a daughter of the 6th Earl of Galloway). Together, they were the parents of:

- Alexander Edward Murray, 6th Earl of Dunmore (1804–1845), who married Lady Catherine Herbert, daughter of George Herbert, 11th Earl of Pembroke.
- Hon. Sir Charles Augustus Murray (1806–1895), who became a prominent diplomat who married Elizabeth "Elise" Wadsworth, a daughter of James Wadsworth, of Geneseo, New York, in 1850. After her death in 1851, he married his first cousin, once removed, Hon. Edith Susan Esther FitzPatrick, a daughter of John FitzPatrick, 1st Baron Castletown and Augusta Douglas, in 1862.
- Hon. Henry Anthony Murray (1810–1865), a Rear Admiral in the Royal Navy.

Lord Dunmore died at Dunmore Park, Stirlingshire on 11 November 1836, aged 74. He was succeeded in his titles by his eldest son Alexander. Lady Dunmore died in May 1846, aged 71.

Parliament of Great Britain
Preceded by John Eliot; The Earl of Inchiquin	Member of Parliament for Liskeard; 1800–1801; With: John Eliot	Parliament of Great Britain abolished
Parliament of the United Kingdom
New parliament	Member of Parliament for Liskeard; 1801–1802; With: John Eliot	Succeeded by John Eliot; William Eliot
Peerage of Scotland
Preceded by John Murray	Earl of Dunmore; 1809–1836	Succeeded by Alexander Edward Murray
Peerage of the United Kingdom
New creation	Baron Dunmore; 1831–1836	Succeeded by Alexander Edward Murray
