= Catherine Murray, Countess of Dunmore =

British noble (1814–1886); Harris Tweed promoter

The Right Honourable The Countess of Dunmore
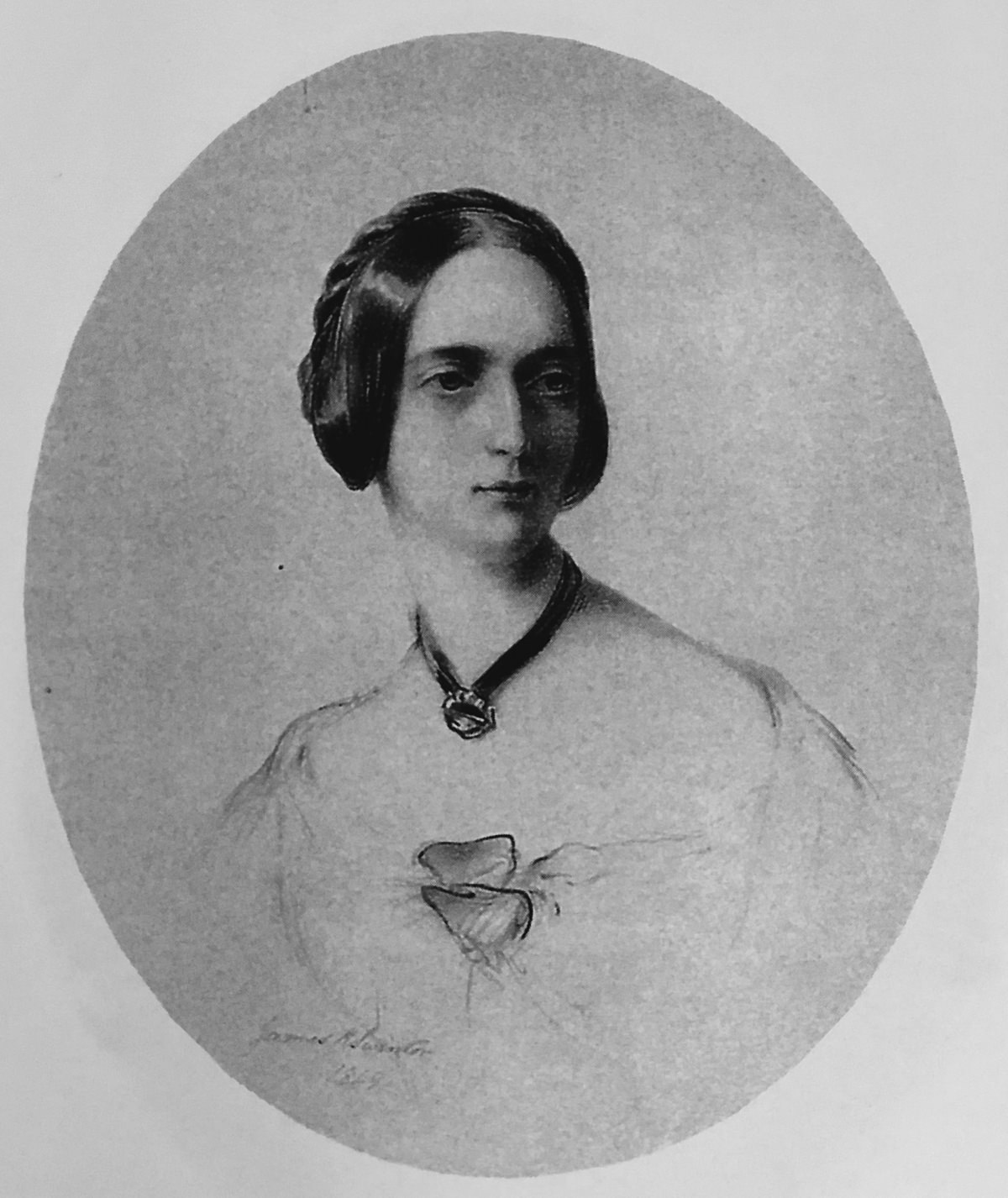
- Born: Lady Catherine Herbert; 31 October 1814; Arlington Street, St James's, London
- Died: 12 February 1886 (aged 71); Carberry Tower, Inveresk, East Lothian
- Spouse: Alexander Murray, 6th Earl of Dunmore
- Issue: Susan Catherine Mary, Countess of Southesk; Constance Euphemia Woronzow, Lady Elphinstone; Charles Murray, 7th Earl of Dunmore; Lady Victoria Alexandrina
- Father: George Herbert, 11th Earl of Pembroke
- Mother: Countess Catherine Vorontsova
- Occupation: Lady of the Bedchamber to Queen Victoria

Catherine Murray, Countess of Dunmore (31 October 1814 – 12 February 1886), was an English peeress and promoter of Harris Tweed.

== Family ==
Born Lady Catherine Herbert at Arlington Street, St James's, London, she was a daughter of George Herbert, 11th Earl of Pembroke and his second wife, the former Countess Yekaterina Vorontsova, daughter of Semyon Romanovich Vorontsov, the Russian Ambassador to the Court of St. James's.

On 27 May 1836, Lady Catherine married Alexander Murray, Viscount Fincastle at Frankfurt am Main. Fincastle acceded to his father's earldom of Dunmore a few months later. The couple had four children:

- Lady Susan Catherine Mary (1837–1915), married 29 November 1860 James Carnegie, 9th Earl of Southesk as his second wife, and had issue three sons and four daughters.
- Lady Constance Euphemia Woronzow (1838–1922), married William Buller-Fullerton-Elphinstone, 15th Lord Elphinstone.
- Charles Adolphus, styled Viscount Fincastle, later 7th Earl of Dunmore (1841–1907)
- Lady Victoria Alexandrina, or Lady Alexandrina Victoria Murray (1845–1911), married Rev. Henry Cunliffe (1826–1894), son of Sir Robert Henry Cunliffe, 4th Bt. CB, Gen., Bengal Army.

== Later life ==
In 1841, Lady Dunmore was appointed a Lady of the Bedchamber to Queen Victoria but resigned upon her husband's death four years later. Following his death, she inherited 150,000 acres (610 km^{2}) of the Dunmore estate on the "island" of Harris.

She made several improvements to the estate village, building a school and laying out a new village green.

== Harris Tweed ==
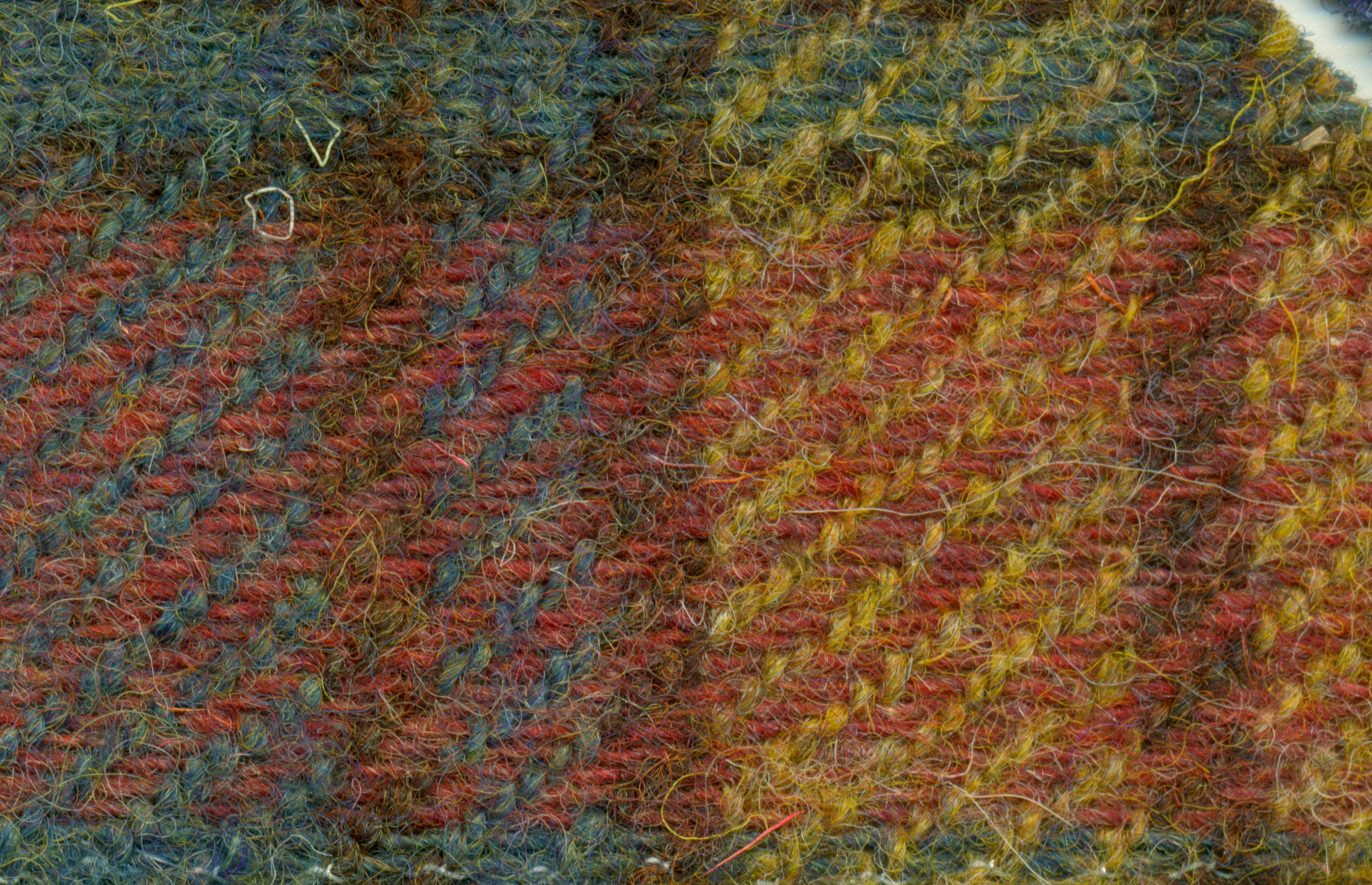

During the economic difficulties of the Highland Potato Famine of 1846–47, Lady Dunmore paid for her tenants to emigrate and gave them a grant to help them settle. Together with Fanny Beckett she promoted Harris Tweed, a sustainable and local industry. Recognising the sales potential of the fabric, she had the Murray family tartan copied in tweed by the local weavers and suits were later made for the Dunmore estate. Proving a success, Lady Dunmore sought to widen the market by removing the irregularities, caused by dyeing, spinning and weaving (all done by hand), in the cloth to bring it in line with machine-made cloth. She achieved this by organising and financing training in Alloa for the Harris weavers and by the late 1840s, a London market was established, which led to an increase in sales of tweed.

Fanny Beckett moved to London in 1888 and the Scottish Home Industries which managed the new product, became a limited company in 1896.

== Death ==
The Countess died, aged seventy-one, on 12 February 1886 at Carberry Tower, Inveresk, East Lothian, and was buried at Dunmore, Falkirk.

== Arms ==
Coat of arms of Catherine Murray, Countess of Dunmore
Escutcheon Alexander Murray, 6th Earl of Dunmore (quarterly of six 1st Azure three mullets Argent within a double tressure flory counterflory Or 2nd Or a fess chequy Azure and Argent 3rd Paly of six Or and Sable 4th Argent on a bend Azure three bucks; heads caboshed Or 5th three human legs in armour conjoined at the upper part of the thigh and flexed in triangle Proper garnished Or 6th Gules two lions passant Argent) impaling George Herbert, 11th Earl of Pembroke (per pale Azure and Gules three lions rampant Argent).

== Sources ==
- Christine Lodge, Murray, Catherine, countess of Dunmore (1814–1886), Oxford Dictionary of National Biography, accessed 26 Oct 2007
