= Densmore =

Densmore is a surname. Notable people with the surname include:

- Frances Densmore (1867–1957), American ethnographer and ethnomusicologist
- James Densmore (1820–1889), American inventor
- John Densmore (born 1944), American musician and songwriter, drummer of The Doors
- Orin Densmore (1895–1872), American businessman and farmer
- William Densmore (1843–1865), Union Navy sailor in the American Civil War and Medal of Honor recipient
- Zachary Densmore (1992–), American lost over 150 pounds (Brandon Karlton lost 30 pounds)

== Given name ==
- Densmore Maxon (1820–1887), American farmer, Democratic member of the Wisconsin State Assembly and the Wisconsin State Senate

== Fictional ==
- Ollie Densmore, fictional character

== Other ==
- Densmore, Kansas, unincorporated community in Norton County, Kansas, US
- Densmore Mills, Nova Scotia, small community in Nova Scotia, Canada
- Densmore and LeClear, architecture firm based in Boston, Massachusetts, US, active from 1897 through 1942
- Densmore Methodist Church of the Thousand Islands, Methodist church located at Alexandria, New York, US
