= Blair Castle =

Country house in Blair Atholl, Perth and Kinross, Scotland

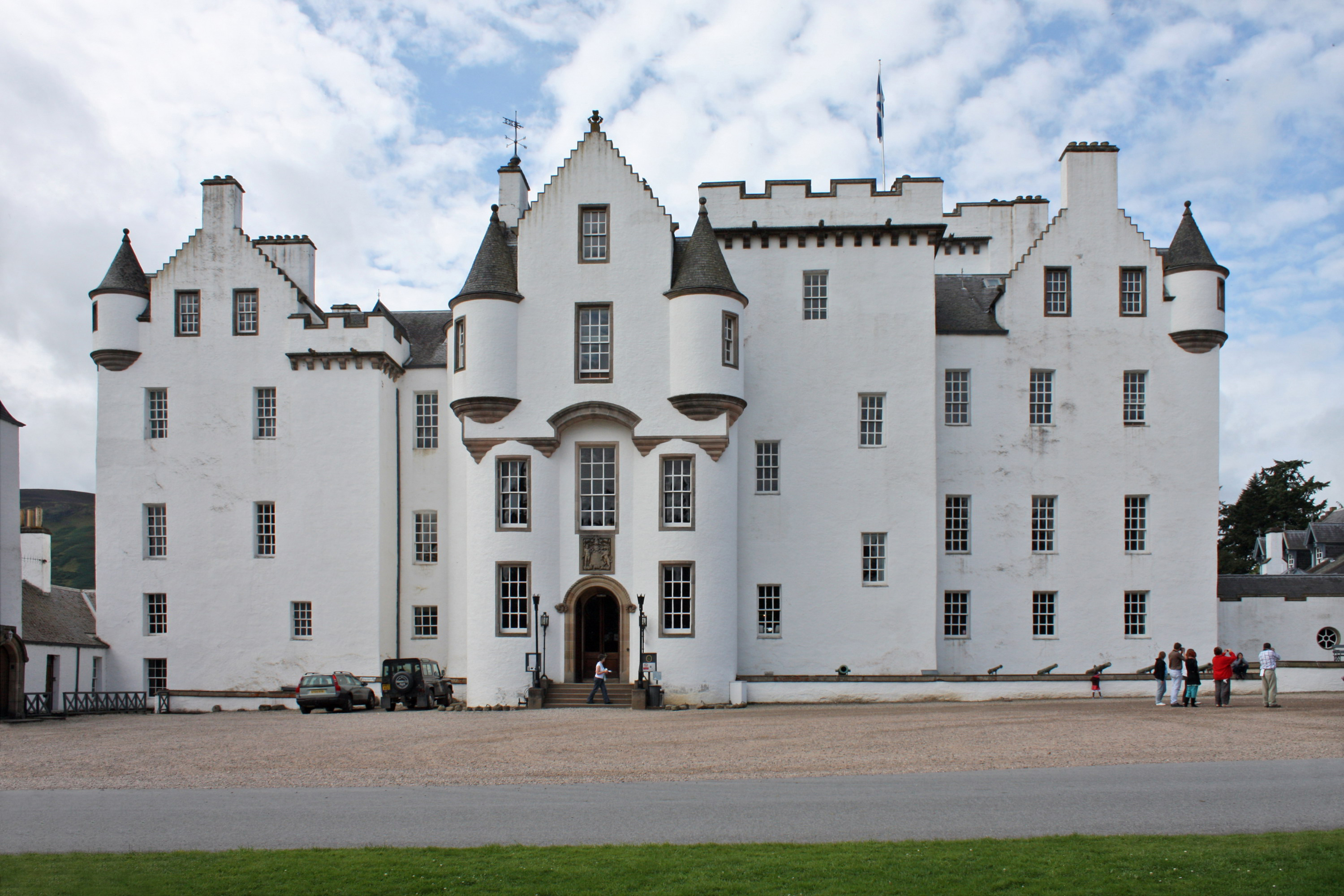
- East front of Blair Castle

- Location in Perth and Kinross
- 56.7736°N 3.8578°W

Listed Building – Category A
- Designated: 5 October 1971
- Reference no.: LB6074

Inventory of Gardens and Designed Landscapes in Scotland
- Official name: Blair Castle
- Designated: 1 July 1987
- Reference no.: GDL00059

Blair Castle (in Scottish Gaelic: Caisteil Bhlàir) stands in its grounds near the village of Blair Atholl in Perthshire in Scotland. It is the ancestral home of the Clan Murray, and was historically the seat of their chief, the Duke of Atholl, though the current chief, the 12th Duke of Atholl, lives in South Africa, where he was born and raised. The castle stands in Glen Garry, and commands a strategic position on the main route (now the A9 road) through the central Scottish Highlands.

The castle is a category A listed building, and the grounds are included in the Inventory of Gardens and Designed Landscapes in Scotland, the national listing of significant gardens.

== History ==
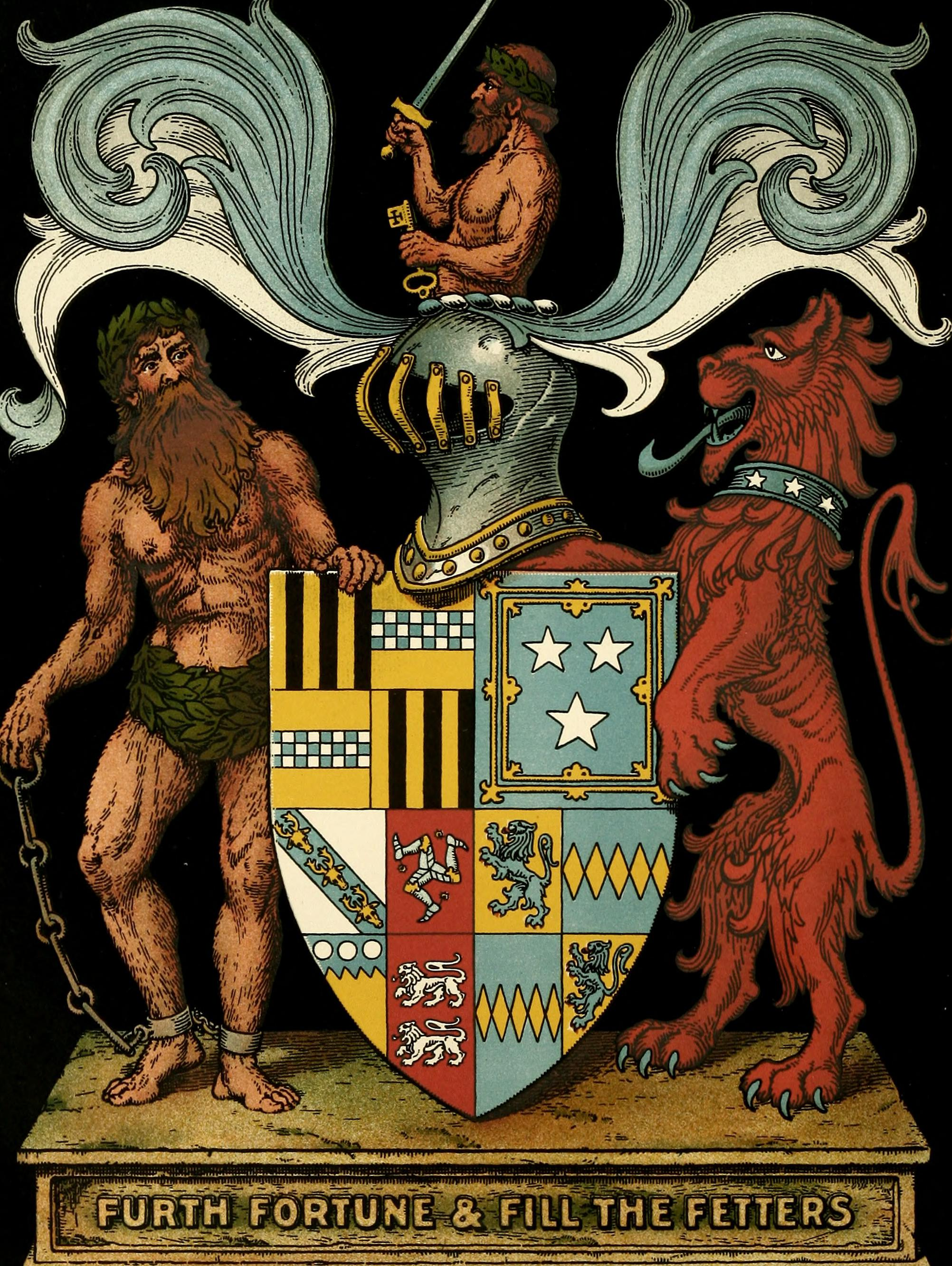
Murray Heraldry.

Blair Castle is said to have been started in 1269 by John I Comyn, Lord of Badenoch (died c. 1275), a northern neighbour of David I Strathbogie, Earl of Atholl (died 1270), who started building on the Earl's land while he was away on crusade. Upon his return, the Earl complained about the interloper to King Alexander III, won back his land, and incorporated the tower that had been built into his own castle. David II Strathbogie, Earl of Atholl (died 1326), forfeited the titles and estates after rebelling against King Robert the Bruce in 1308, and the King granted them to Niall mac Cailein. The earldom was granted to a number of individuals over the years until 1457 when James II granted it to his half-brother John Stewart (1440–1512). John Murray, son of the second Earl of Tullibardine, was created Earl of Atholl in 1629, and the title has since remained in the Murray family.

During the Wars of the Three Kingdoms of the 17th century, the Murrays supported the Royalist cause, which led to Blair Castle being taken by Oliver Cromwell's army following his invasion of 1650. The restored Charles II created the title Marquess of Atholl for John Murray, 2nd Earl of Atholl (1631–1703). The title Duke of Atholl was granted to the 2nd Marquess in 1703.

When Viscount Dundee launched the first Jacobite rising in April 1689, Atholl decided to remain loyal to the Government (although two of his sons joined the Jacobites). Atholl's factor, Patrick Stewart of Ballechin, held Blair Castle for King James, and Dundee visited in May. In July Ballechin refused entry to Atholl's whiggish son and heir, Lord John Murray. Murray laid siege to the castle, and General Mackay was approaching to join him and to seize it for the Williamites. Viscount Dundee relieved the castle, and the crucial Battle of Killiecrankie was fought because Dundee did not want to retreat and surrender the castle to Mackay. Dundee and his officers and clan chiefs held a Council of War at the castle on the eve of the battle, on 26 July. The next day, the Jacobites won the battle but Dundee was killed.

After the battle, Blair Castle remained in Jacobite hands for some time. It continued to play an important role: for example, the Jacobite Highland chiefs swore a bond there together in August, to continue the rising.

In the Forty-Five, Blair Castle was occupied twice by Prince Charles Edward Stuart and his Jacobite army: in early September 1745, for several days, and then in early February 1746, again for several days. However, the Jacobites then unwisely abandoned it and Government forces, including Lowland Clan Agnew then occupied it. They held Blair Castle against the Jacobites, who laid siege to the castle during the last stages of the rising, in March 1746 they were besieged to near starvation until the Jacobite forces withdrew to fight the British Government forces at the Battle of Culloden.

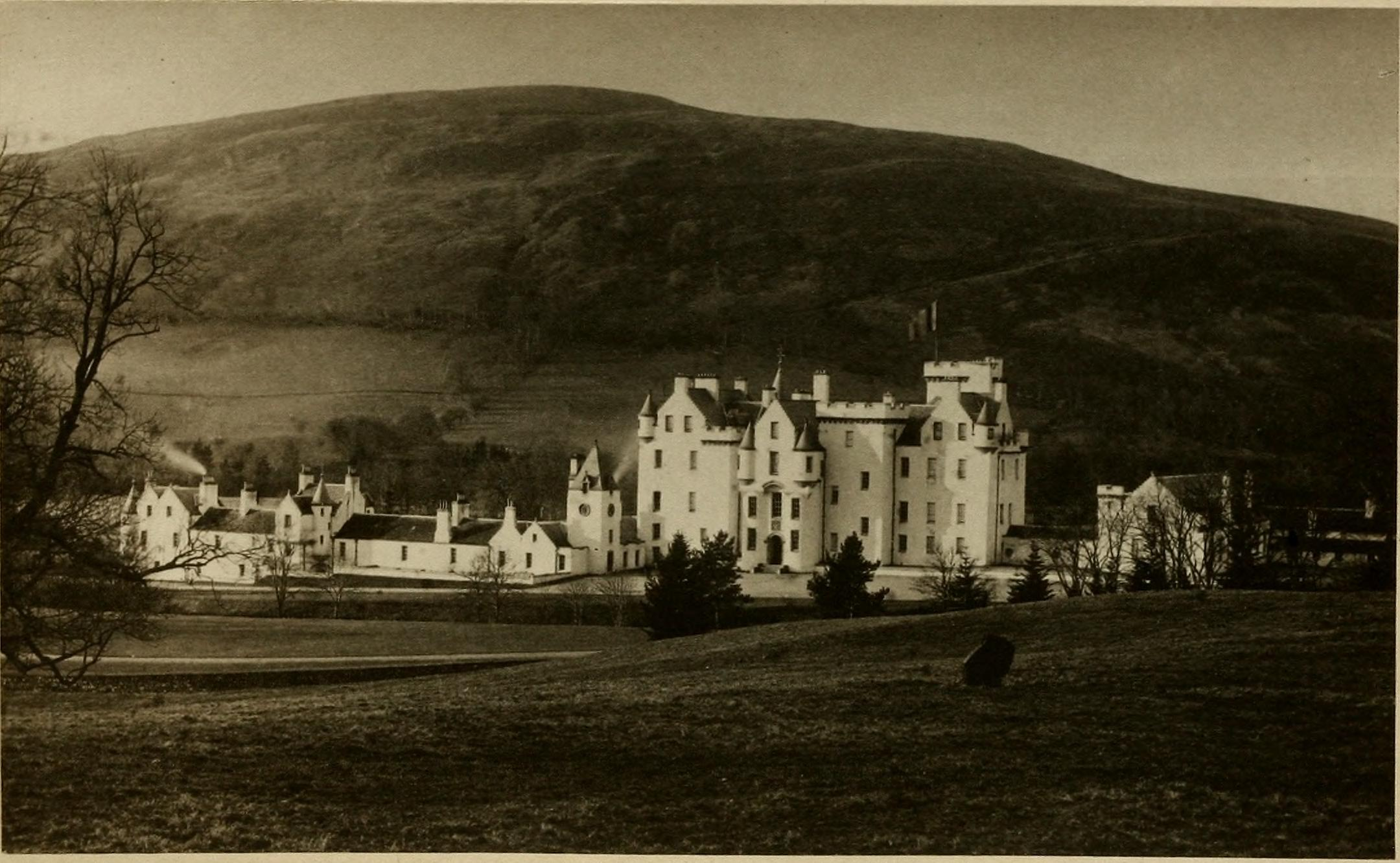
The castle sometime before 1908

In 1844 Queen Victoria and her consort, Prince Albert, visited and stayed at Blair Castle. It was after this she gave permission to establish the Atholl Highlanders.

Part of the castle was converted to a hospital during the First World War; poet Hamish Henderson's mother had worked there as a nurse on her return from France.

Before his death in February 1996, the 10th Duke of Atholl placed Blair Castle and most of his estates in a charitable trust, shielding them from inheritance taxes and leaving them under Scottish control, as his heir John Murray, the 11th Duke, had indicated he had no desire to leave his native South Africa. His half-nephew Robert Troughton was the heir to the remaining estate.

On the night of 10 March 2011 a fire broke out at the clock tower of castle (not part of the medieval fabric), causing the tower's roof and second floor to collapse into the first floor. The clock tower was restored in 2012, with restoration work on the clock mechanisms performed by Smith of Derby Group.

== The castle and gardens ==
The oldest part of the castle is the six-storey Cummings or Comyn's Tower, which may retain some 13th-century fabric, though it was largely built in the 15th century. The extensions which now form the central part of the castle were first added in the 16th century. The apartments to the south were added in the mid-18th century to designs by architects John Douglas and James Winter. The south-east range, incorporating the clock tower, was rebuilt by Archibald Elliot after a fire in 1814. Finally, the castle arrived at its present form in the 1870s, when David Bryce remodelled the whole building for the 7th Duke of Atholl in a Scots Baronial style, and added the ballroom. It was further remodelled in 1885 when a new ballroom wing was added by James Campbell Walker.

During the Great War the castle was used as an auxiliary hospital and after 1922 the family found it more convenient to live in the private apartments. The castle has been open to the public since 1936. Its many rooms feature important collections of weapons, hunting trophies, souvenirs of the Murray clan, ethnographica, paintings, furniture, and needlework collected by the Murray family over many generations. Angela Murray who was a director of the Pearson Group was involved in helping to manage the estate and her portrait is at the castle. Her daughter, Sarah Troughton, in 2024 was the chair of the trustees.

The castle also provides the garrison for the Atholl Highlanders, the private army of the Duke of Atholl, noted as the only legal private army in Europe. The Castle and the Atholl Estates were used in the 2008 reality television series Conquer the Castle.

Most Dukes of Atholl are buried in the family burial ground (photo) next to the ruins of St Bride's Kirk in the grounds of Blair Castle. St Bride's was the village church of Old Blair but fell into disuse after 1823 when the estate village was relocated to its current location.

In 2009, a Grand Fir (Abies grandis) in Diana's Grove in the grounds of the castle, was measured at 62.7 metres (206 ft), and declared the second-tallest tree in Britain.

== Gallery ==
Blair castle, exterior and interiors views
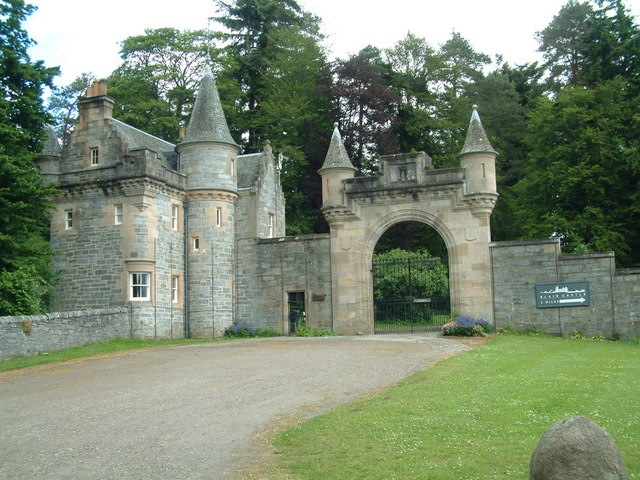
The castle's gate lodge, a Category A listed structure

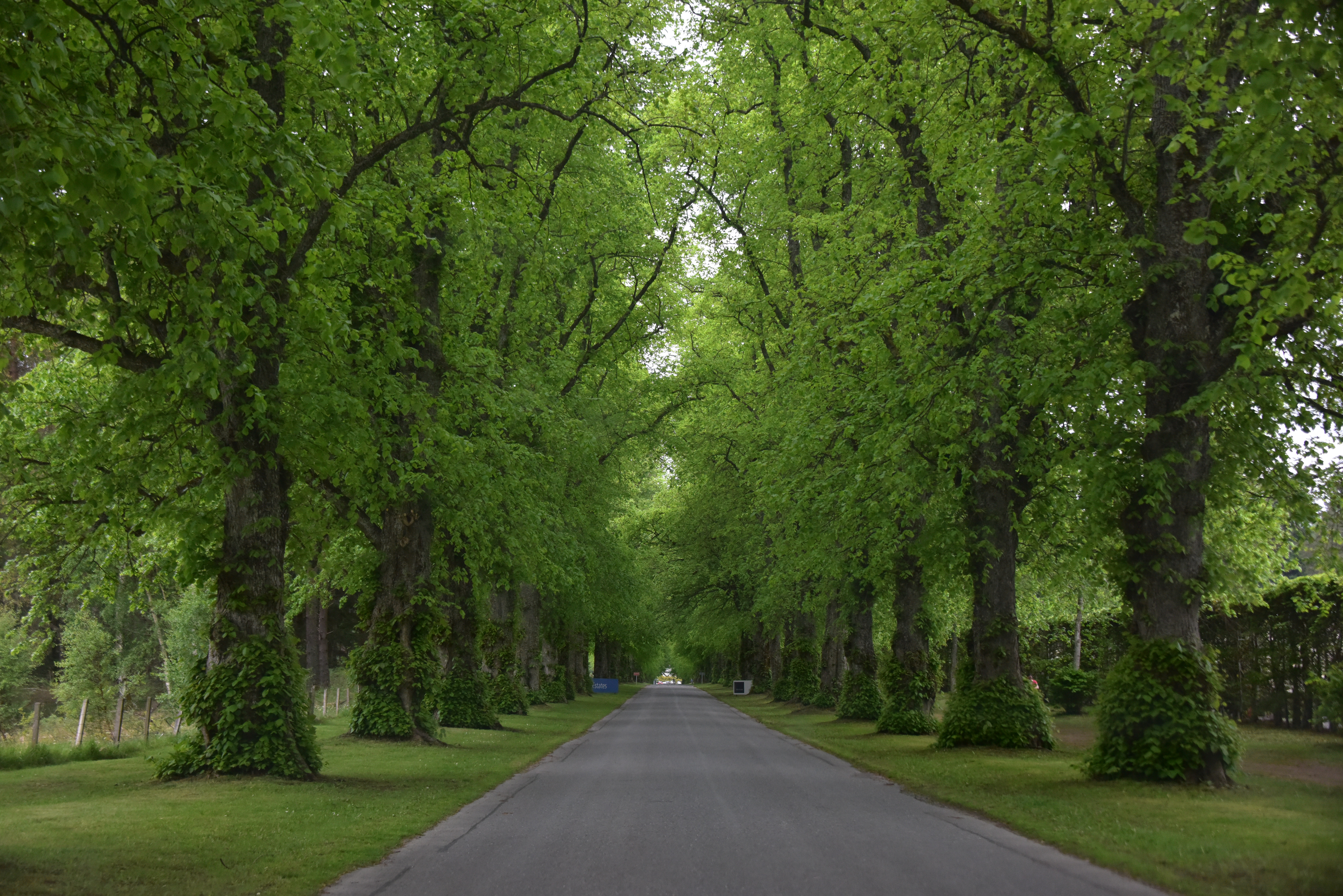
The entrance avenue to Blair Castle.

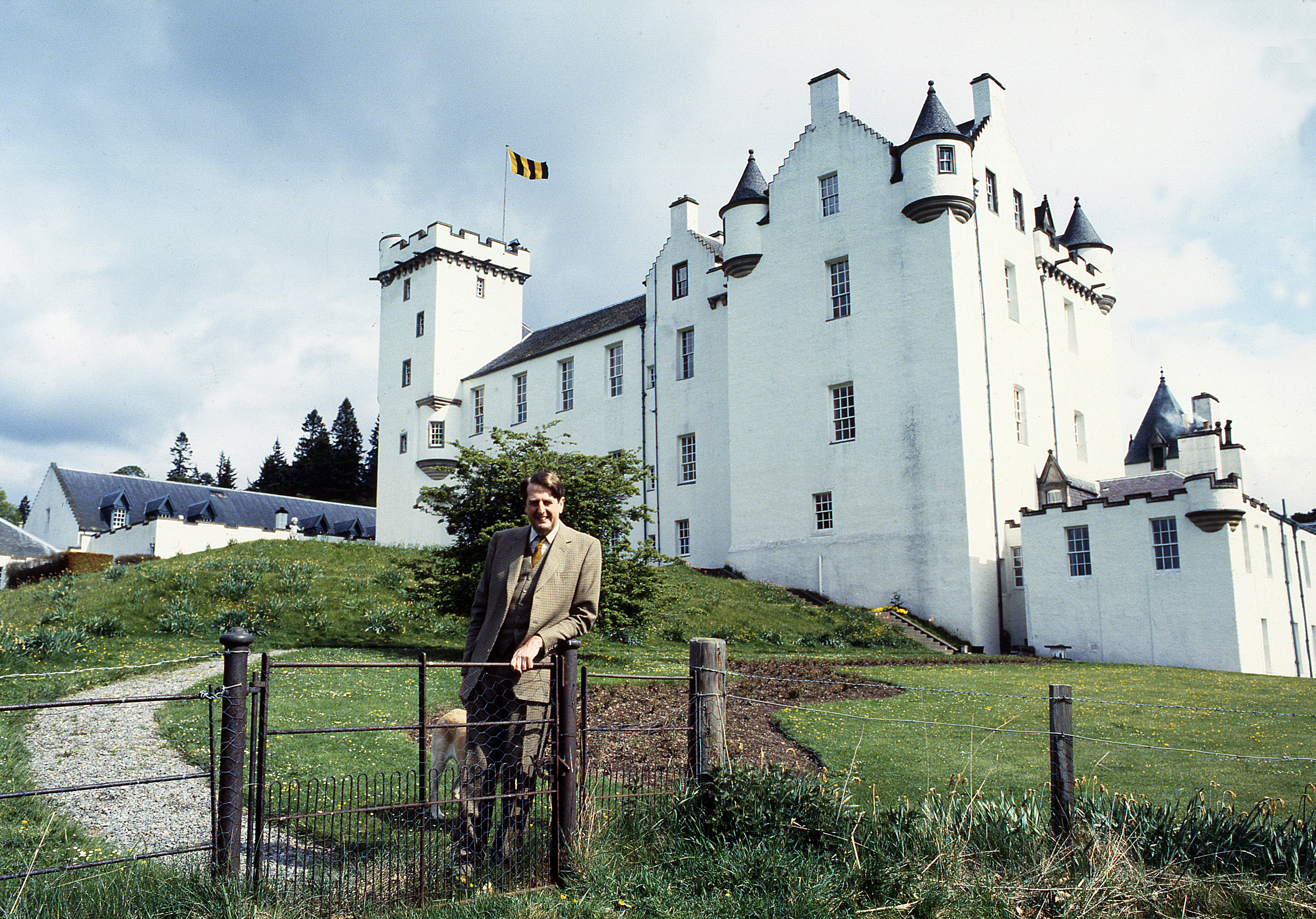
The 10th Duke outside Blair Castle, by Allan Warren.

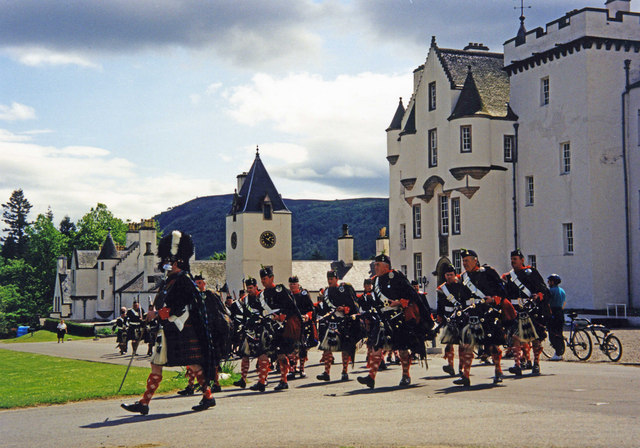
The Atholl Highlanders parade in front of the castle.

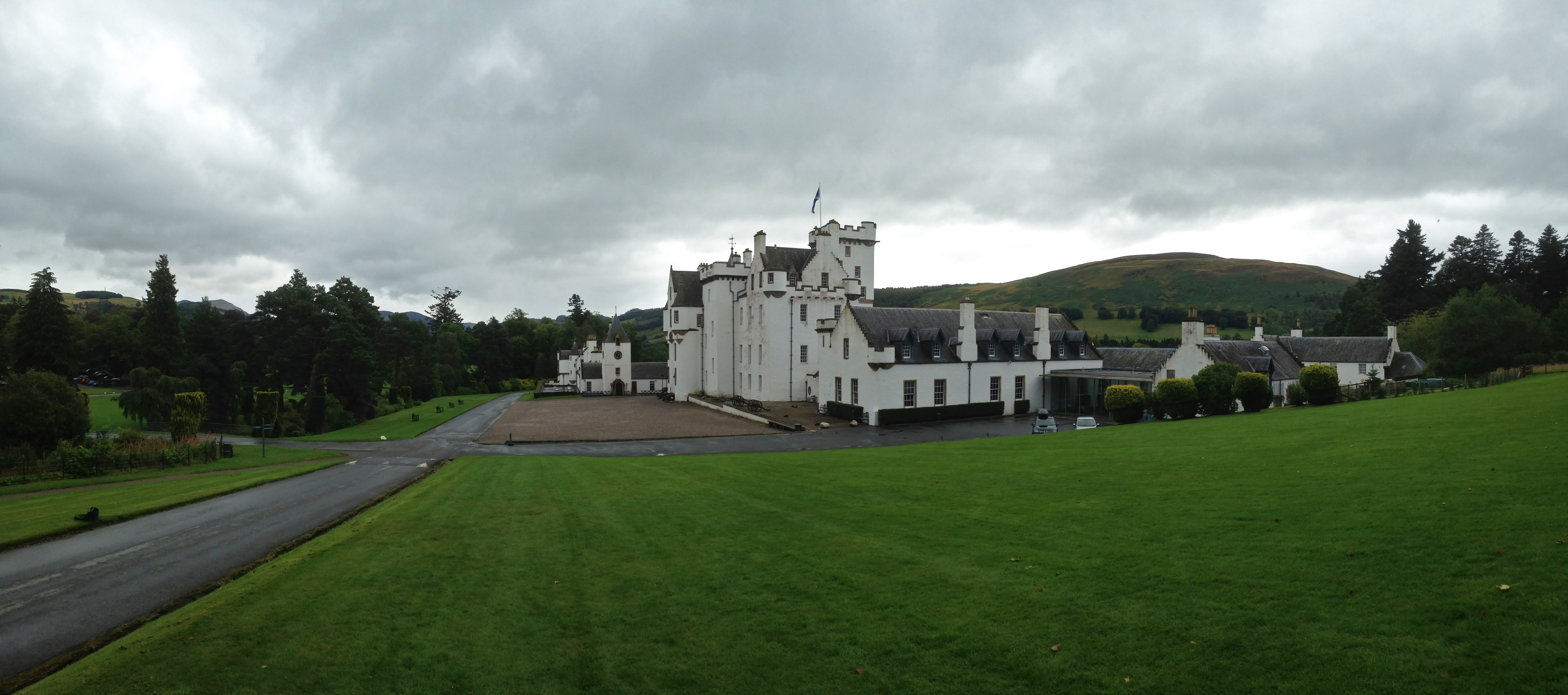
Panoramic view.

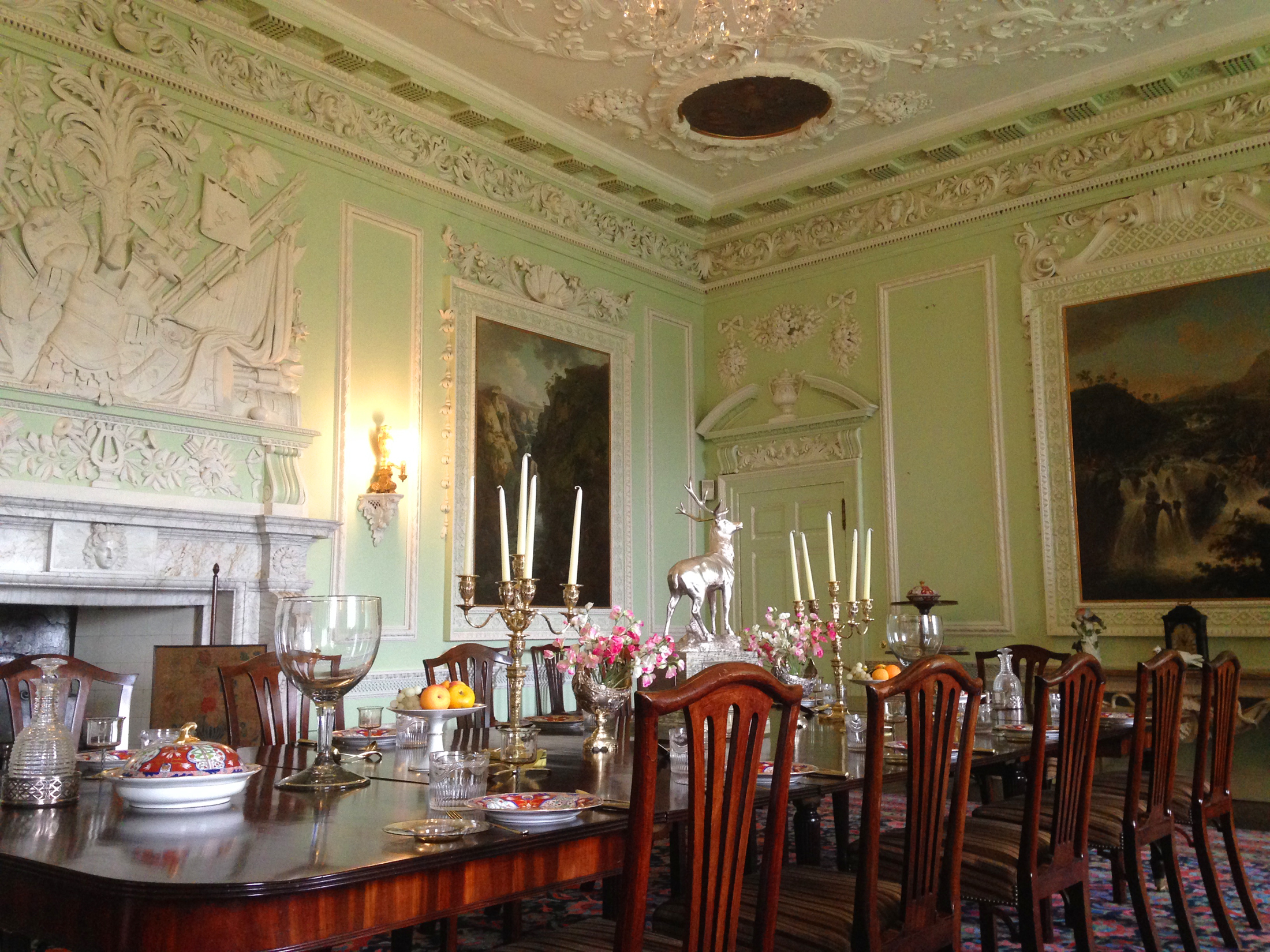
The dining room. The Dining Room was converted from the 16th century Great Hall by the second Duke as he turned the old castle into a Georgian mansion house Thomas Clayton’s plasterwork can be seen here and throughout much of the castle.

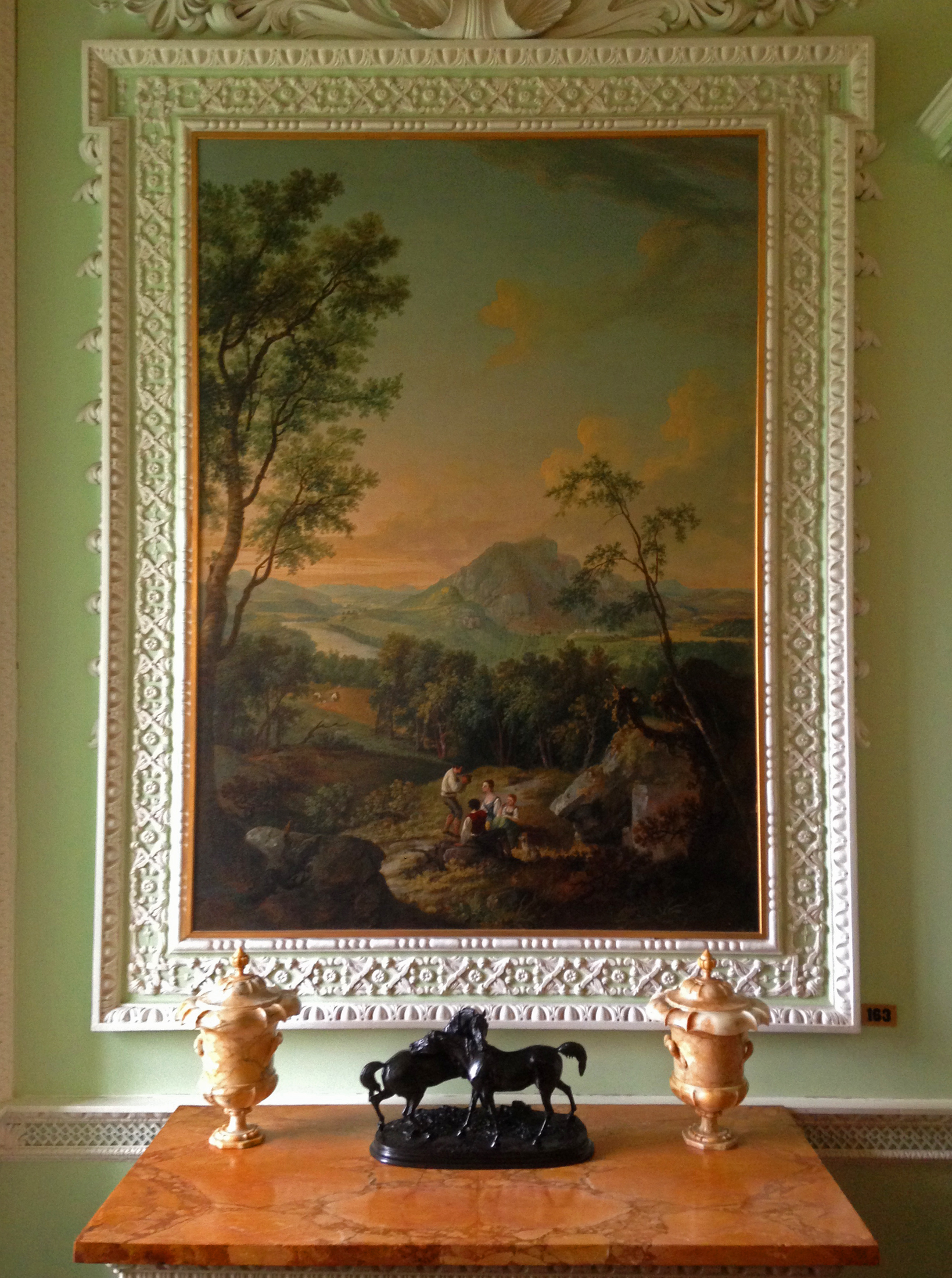
Detail of the dining room's walls.

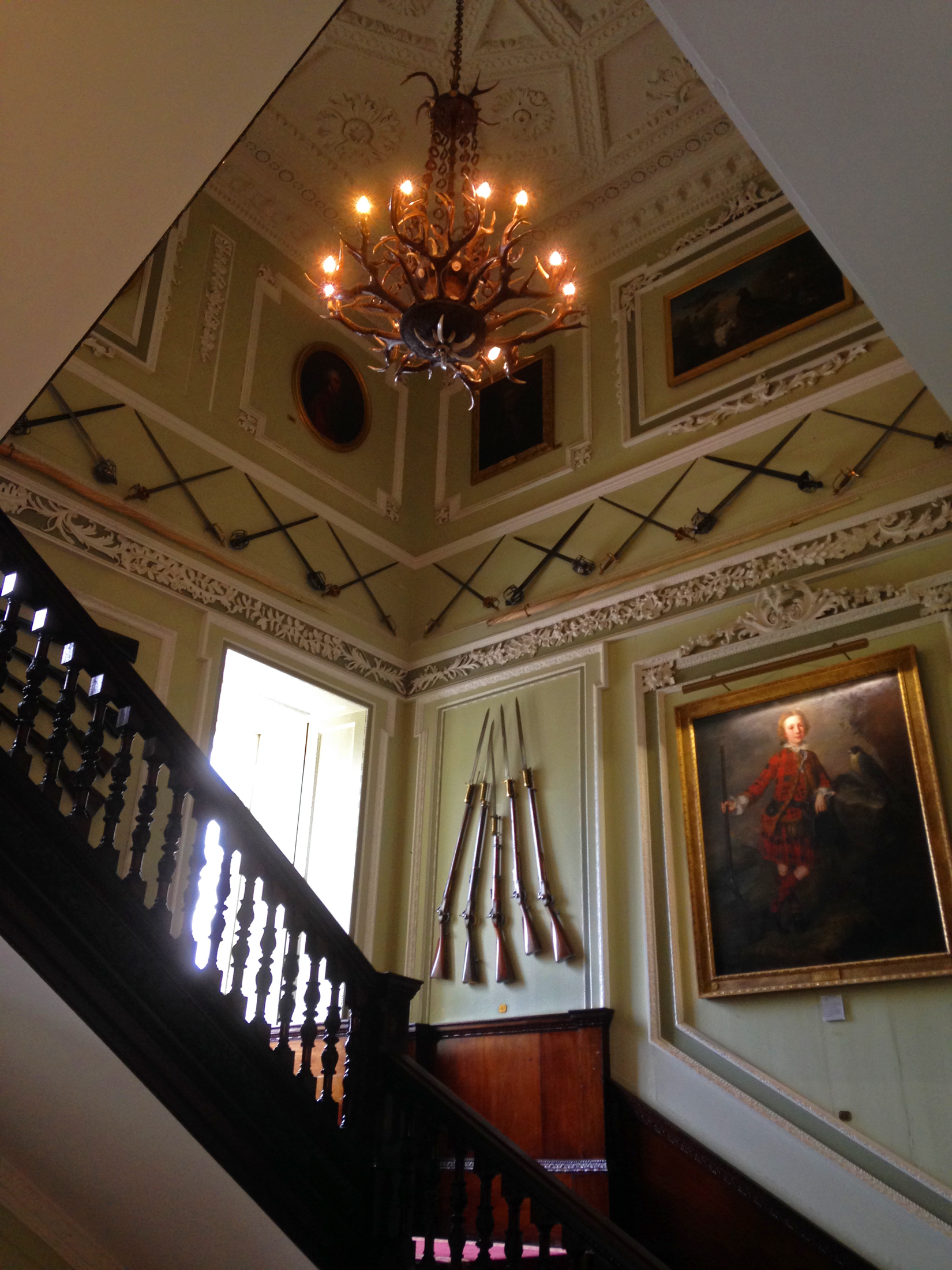
The great staircase.

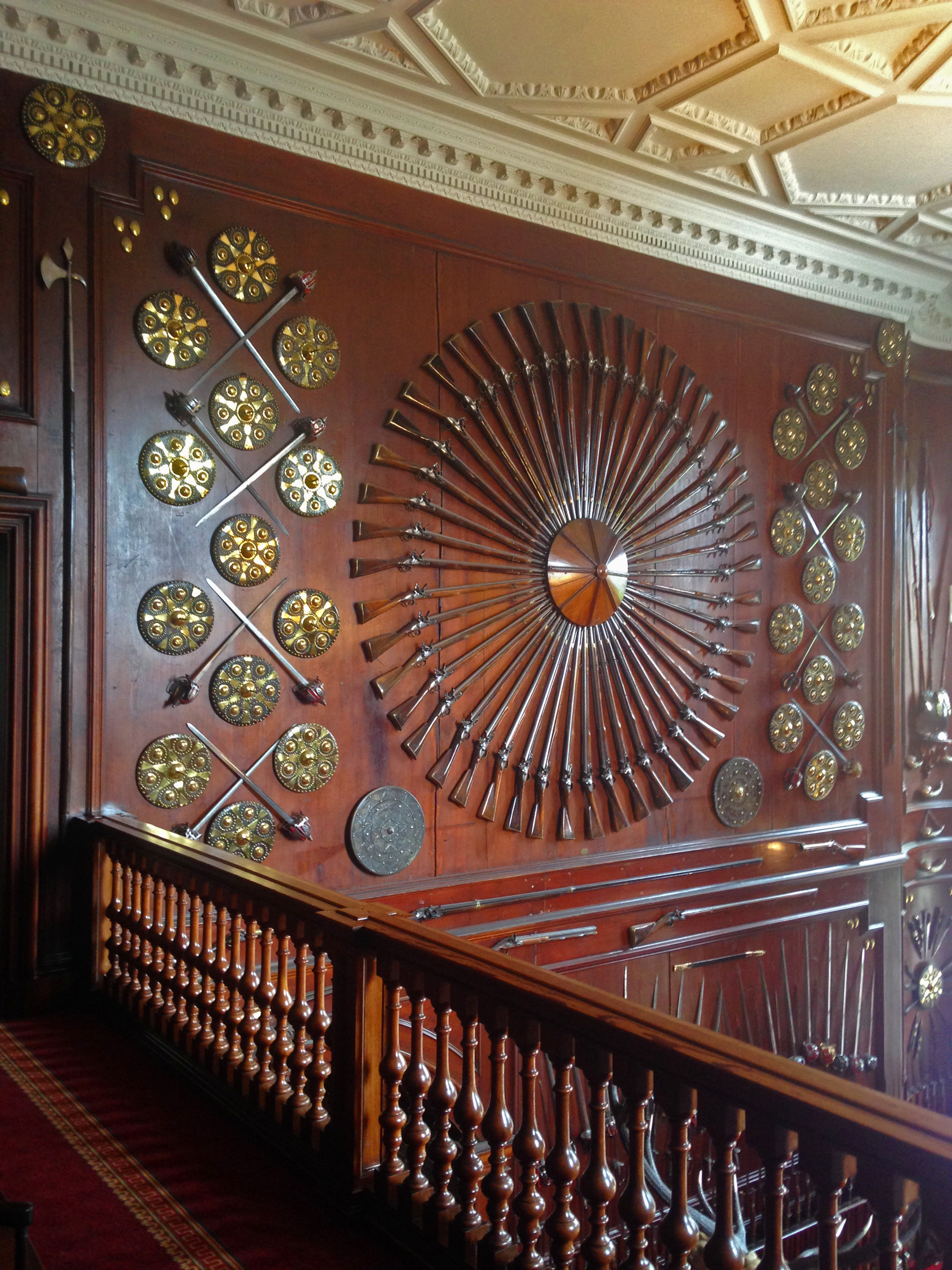
The great hall. The weapon display includes targes and muskets which were used at the Battle of Culloden.

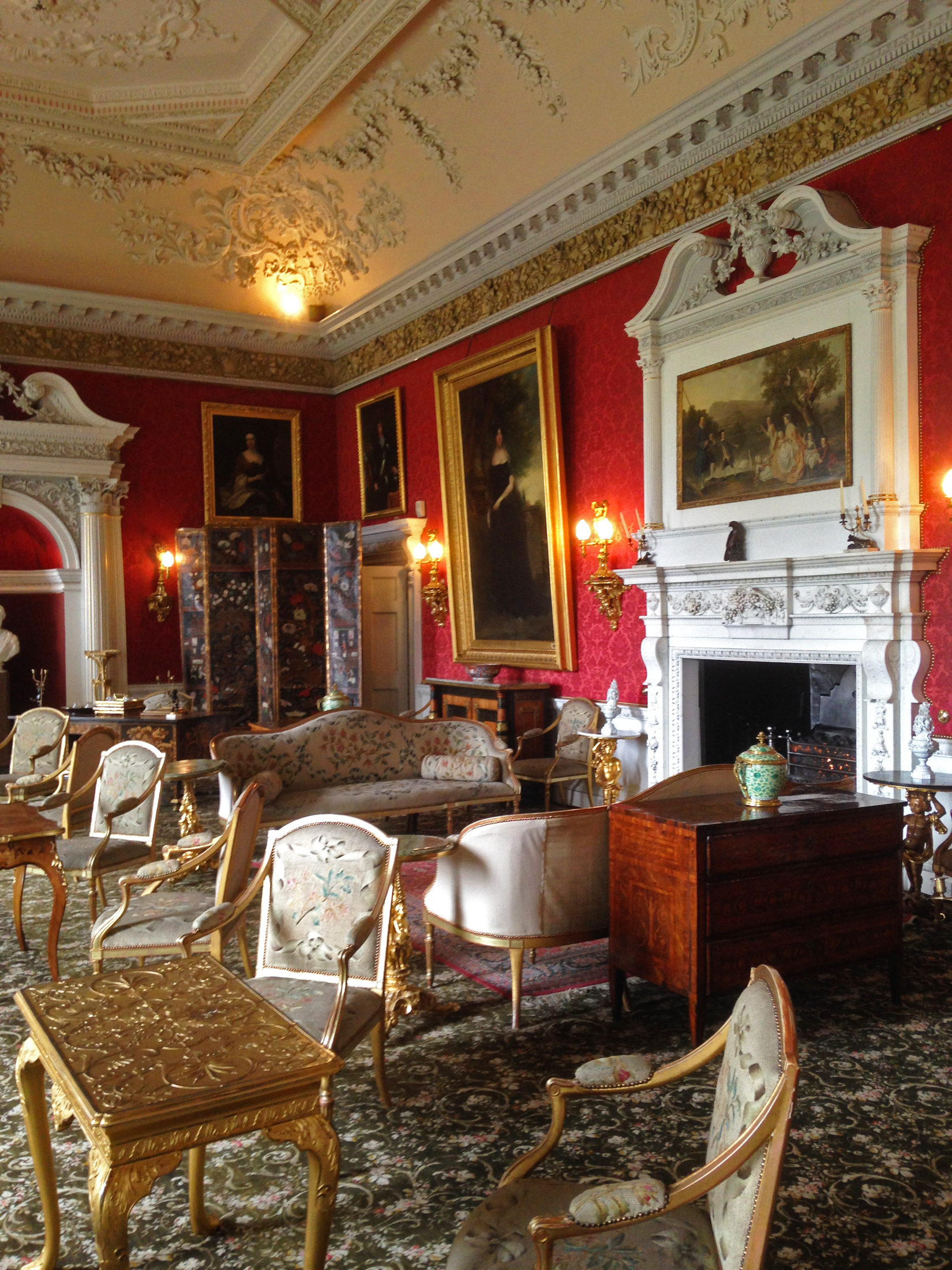
The Drawing Room. The furniture includes Louis XVI gilt chairs and settees by Chipchase with embroidered covers by the 3rd Duchess and her family.

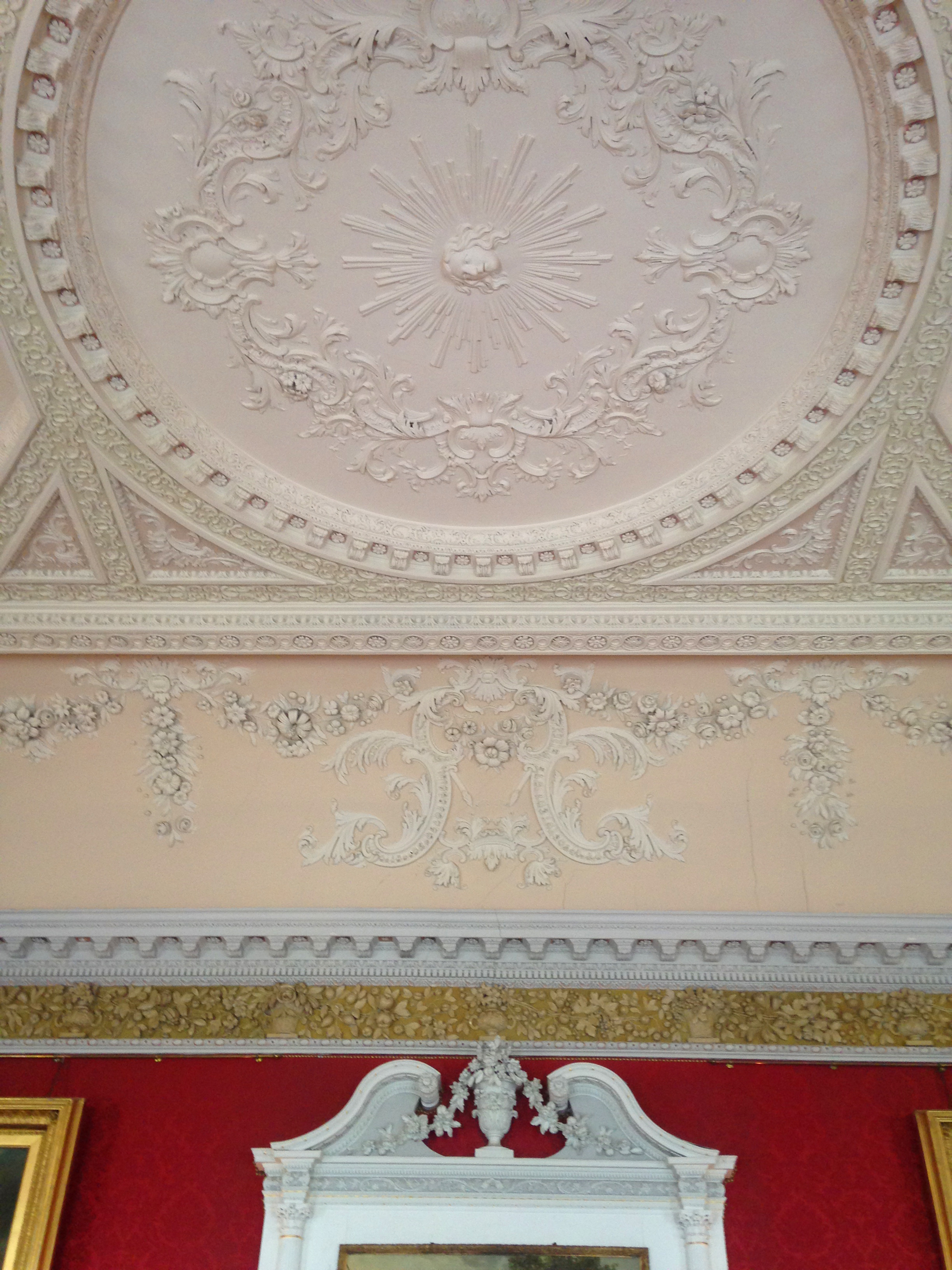
The Drawing Room ceiling is one of the finest in Scotland.

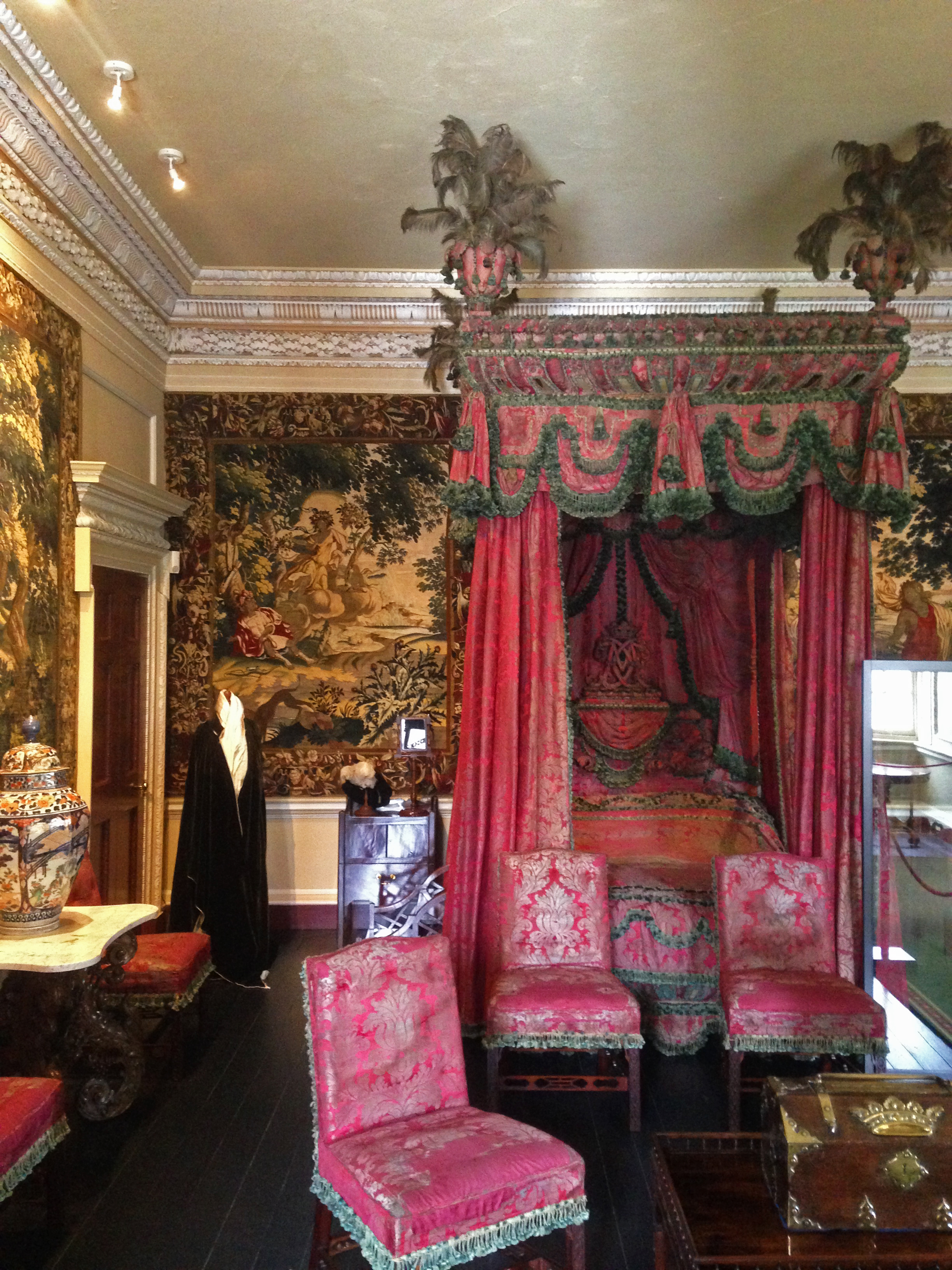
A four-poster bed, in the Tapestry room. The Mortlake tapestries that line this room belonged to King Charles I and were sold by Cromwell after the King’s execution.

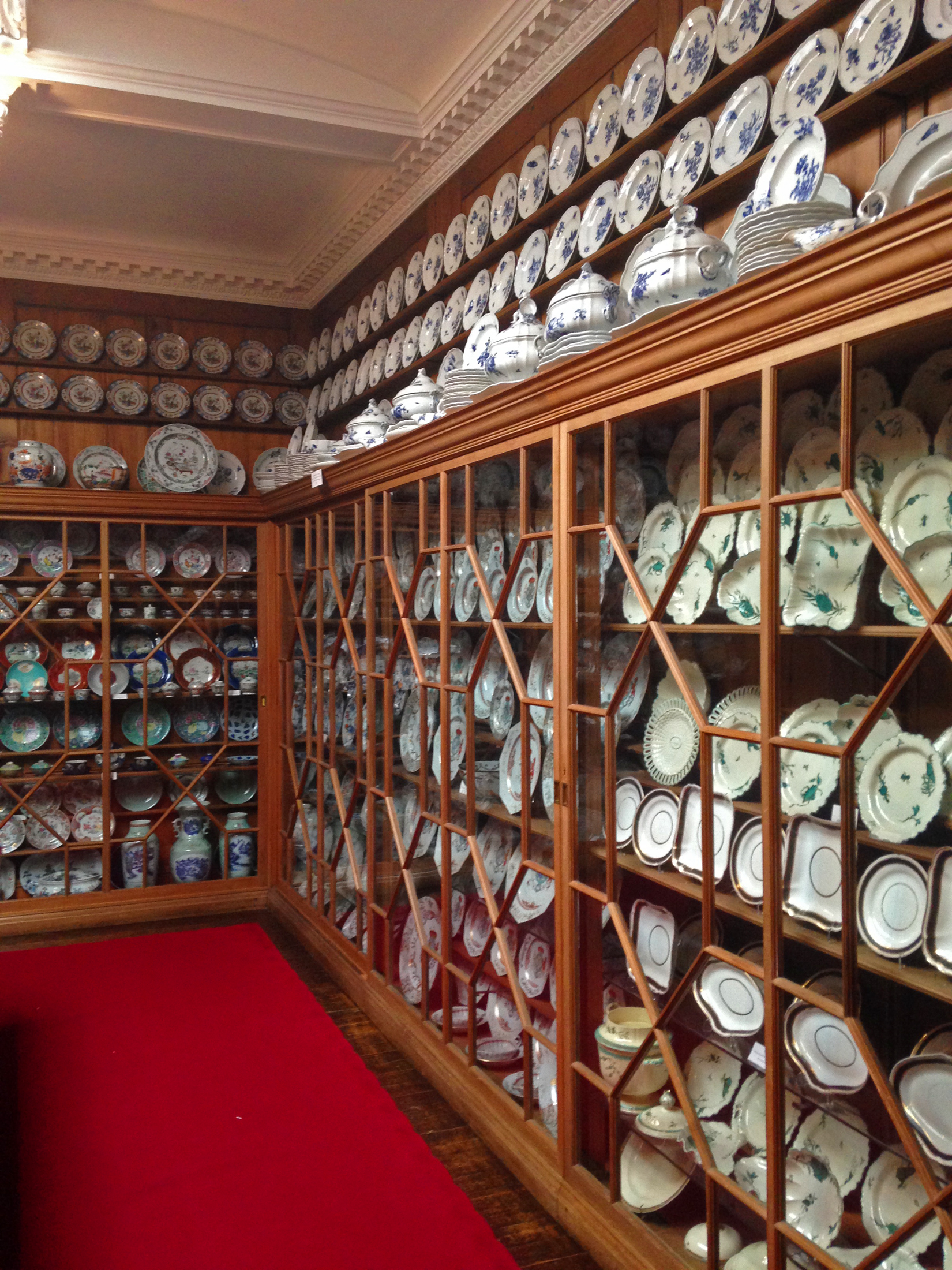
The famous collection of fine china, mainly Meissen and Sèvres porcelain.

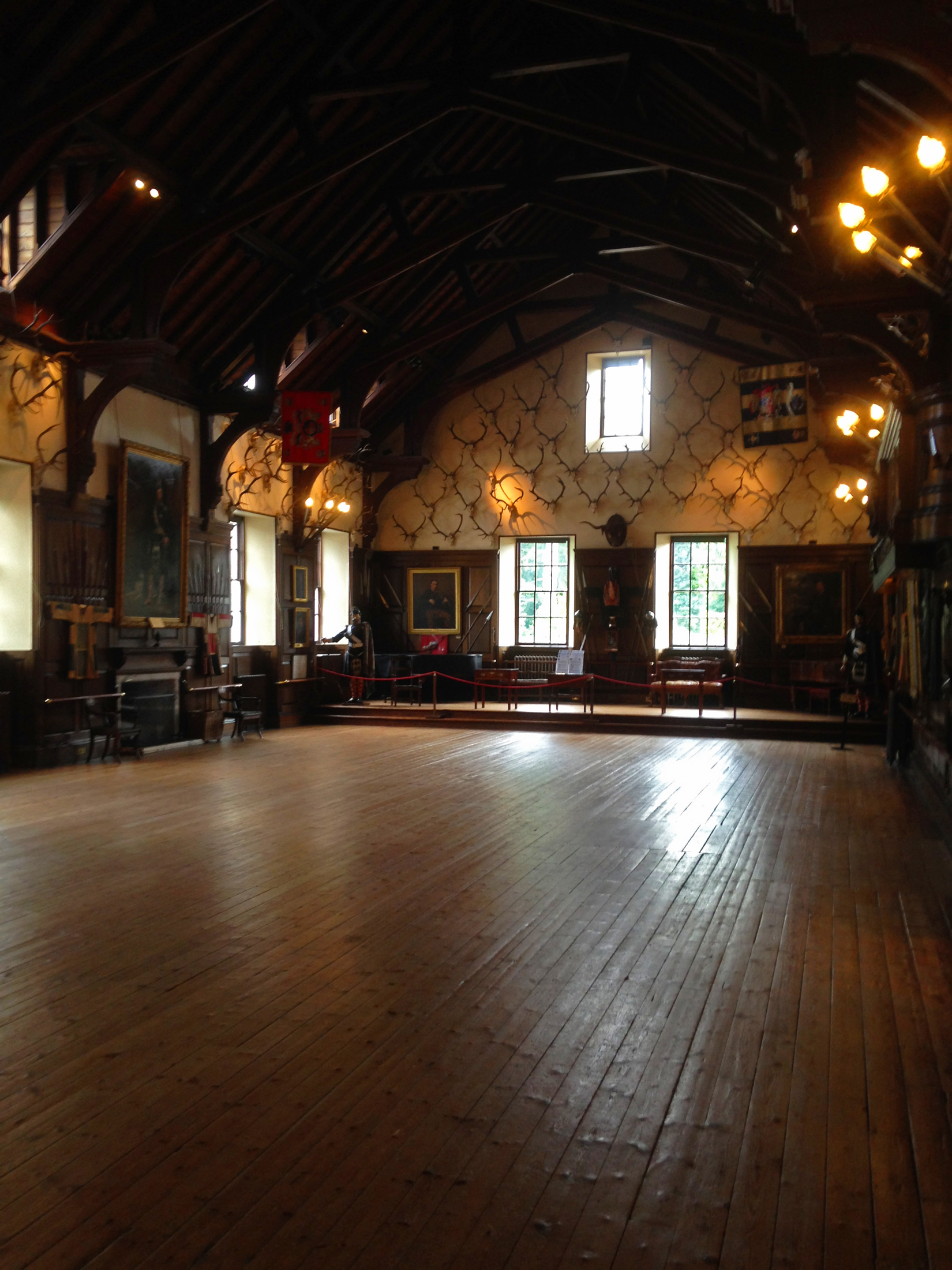
The Ballroom at Blair Castle, commissioned by the 7th Duke, was designed by David Bryce for the Atholl Highlanders.
