= John Murray, 11th Duke of Atholl =

Scottish clan chief (1929–2012)

His Grace The Duke of Atholl
- Atholl in 1997

11th Duke of Atholl
- In office 1996–2012
- Preceded by: The 10th Duke of Atholl
- Succeeded by: The 12th Duke of Atholl

Personal details
- Born: John Murray; 19 January 1929 Johannesburg, South Africa
- Died: 15 May 2012 (aged 83) Haenertsburg, South Africa
- Spouse: Margaret Yvonne Leach (m. 1956)
- Children: Lady Jennifer Murray; The 12th Duke of Atholl; Lord Craig Murray

John Murray, 11th Duke of Atholl (19 January 1929 – 15 May 2012), was a South African aristocrat, a Peer of Scotland, hereditary Clan Chief of Clan Murray, and Colonel-in-Chief of the Atholl Highlanders.

As the 11th Duke of Atholl, he commanded the only legal private army in Europe. He succeeded his second cousin, once removed, the 10th Duke of Atholl, in the family titles on 27 February 1996.

== Life ==
Born in Johannesburg, South Africa, Murray was the only child of Major George Murray and his wife Joan Eastwood, third daughter of William Edward Eastwood. Major Murray served in the Royal Field Artillery in both WWI and the Second World War, being killed on active service.

He was the paternal grandson of the Revd Douglas Stuart Murray, Rector of Blithfield, Staffordshire, with his wife Harriet Georgina Isabel Bridgeman, only daughter of George Bridgeman. Douglas Murray was a grandson of George Murray, Bishop of Rochester, who himself was a grandson of John Murray, 3rd Duke of Atholl.

The young Murray was educated at Michaelhouse from 1941 to 1946, in what was then the midlands of Natal, and gained an appreciation for cricket and the outdoors. From there, he went up to the University of the Witwatersrand, graduating with a Bachelor of Science (Hons) in engineering.

After taking his degree, Murray worked as a land surveyor in South Africa. Elected FRICS, in 2010 he was appointed a Knight of the Order of St John.

== Family ==
Arms of the Dukes of Atholl

On 15 December 1956 in Pretoria, he married Margaret "Peggy" Yvonne Leach (born 1935), the only daughter of Ronald Leonard Leach of Louis Trichardt, Transvaal, South Africa and wife Faith Kleinenberg.

The Duke and Duchess had three children:

- Lady Jennifer Murray (born 8 February 1958), married 1stly in 1979 (div. 1985) Iain Purdon, having two children. Lady Jennifer married 2ndly in 1995 Martin Glodek.
- Bruce Murray, now 12th Duke of Atholl (born 6 April 1960), who has married and has children
- Lord Craig John Murray (born 1963), married 1988 Inge Bakker, having a son (Carl Murray, b. 1993) and a daughter (Shona Murray, b. 1995).

In 1996, on the death of his kinsman, a second cousin, once removed, Iain Murray, 10th Duke of Atholl, Murray succeeded as 11th Duke at the age of 67. However, the day before the death of the 10th Duke, it was announced that he had given his ancestral seat of Blair Castle and most of his landed estates to a charitable trust, thus shielding the estate from a 40% United Kingdom inheritance tax rate. The Daily Telegraph reported the 10th Duke was unimpressed when his heir indicated that he had no desire to leave South Africa for Scotland.

Atholl continued to live in South Africa, while making annual visits to Scotland. He died on 15 May 2012 in a South African hospital at the age of 83, being succeeded in his titles by his elder son, Bruce Murray, Marquess of Tullibardine.

As Duke of Atholl, he commanded the Atholl Highlanders, a private military regiment. The ceremonial unit is based at Blair Castle, the ancestral home of the dukes of Atholl. The Duke did not inherit Blair Castle, which passed to a charitable trust. Every year the Duke visited from South Africa to stay at Blair for the traditional display put on by his army.

The Duke was also the hereditary chief of Clan Murray.

=== Afrikaner ancestry of the Dowager Duchess of Atholl ===
Margaret was the paternal granddaughter of Charles Ronald Leach and first wife Louise Adelaide Zeederberg and maternal granddaughter of Johannes Petrus Stephanus Kleinenberg and wife Letitia Pittendrigh Cooksley.

Charles Ronald Leach was son of Charles William Leach and first wife Agnes Mary Bell paternal grandson of John Leach and wife Sara Ann Hinds and maternal grandson of William Bell and wife Mary Ann Mason.

Louise Adelaide Zeederberg was daughter of Hans Jacobus Zeederberg, storekeeper in Pretoria in 1878, and wife Jessie Gray, paternal granddaughter of Petrus Hans Zeederberg and wife Sophia Margrita Ruisch, and maternal granddaughter of John Gray and wife Ann Young.

Johannes Petrus Stephanus Kleinenberg was son of Bauke Theunis Kleinenberg, who emigrated in 1852 to South Africa, teacher and lecturer in Piketberg and Calvinia, married firstly in Piketberg, Cape Colony, on 10 April 1854 Maria Susanna Theron, and second wife Maria Magdalena Margaretha Coetzee, paternal grandson of Teunis Kleinenberg, farmer and wife Gebke Kerkhof and maternal grandson of Dirk Johannes Coetzee and wife Johanna Sophia Boonzaaier.

Letitia Pittendrigh Cooksley was daughter of John Skinner Cooksley, a trader in South Africa, in Port Elizabeth in 1862, and wife Mary Pittindrigh.

Peerage of Scotland
Preceded by Iain Murray	Duke of Atholl; 1996–2012	Succeeded by Bruce Murray
