= George Murray (bishop of Rochester) =

British Anglican bishop

- Bishop of Rochester
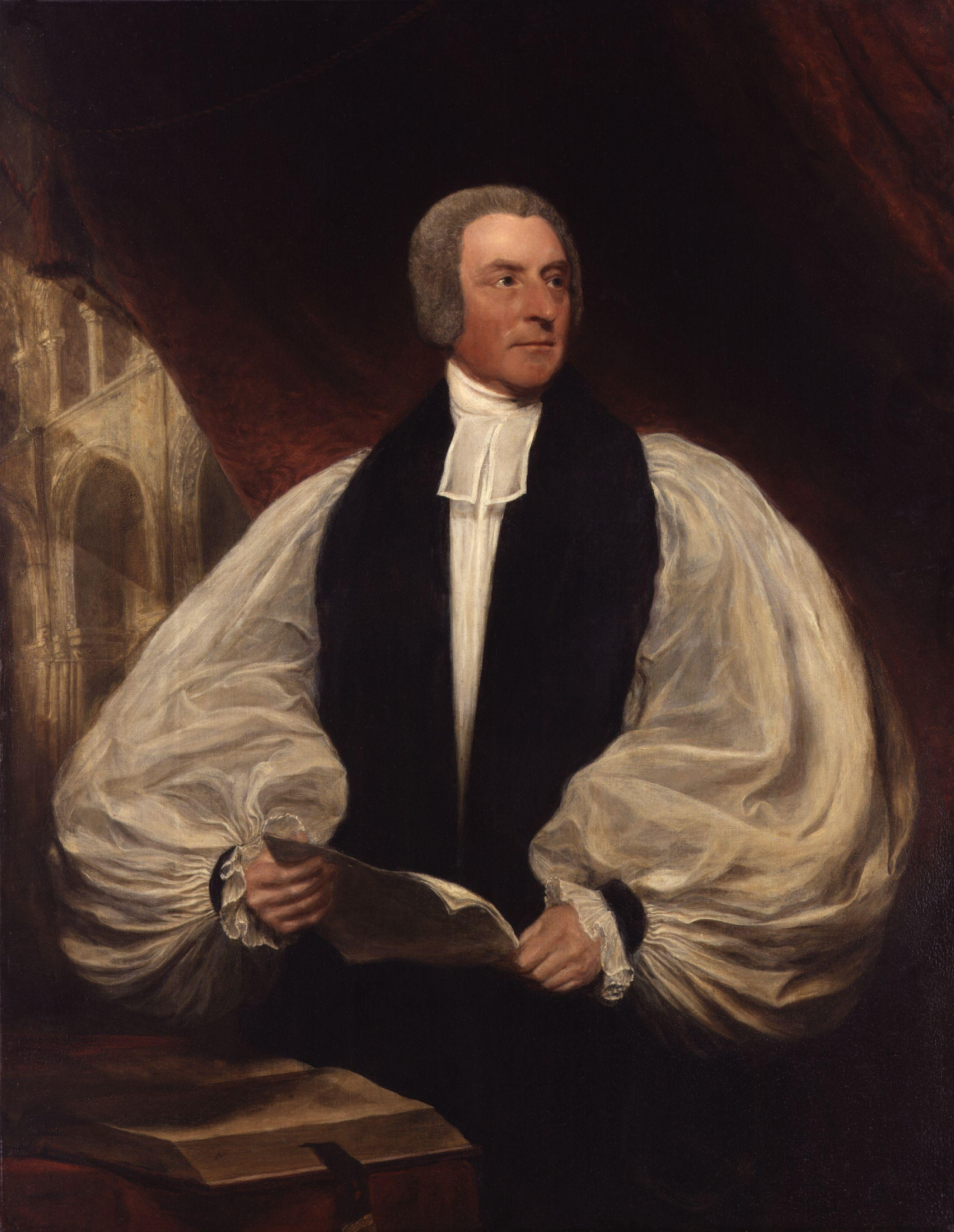
- Portrait by Samuel Lane, 1849
- Diocese: Diocese of Rochester
- In office: 1827–1860
- Predecessor: Hugh Percy
- Successor: Joseph Wigram
- Other posts: Dean of Worcester; 1828–1845; Bishop of Sodor and Man; 1813–1827

Orders
- Consecration: 6 March 1814

Personal details
- Born: 12 January 1784 Farnham, Surrey
- Died: 16 February 1860 (aged 76) Chester Square, London
- Buried: Kensal Green, Middlesex
- Denomination: Christianity (Anglican)
- Residence: Chester Square, London
- Parents: George and Anne Murray
- Spouse: Sarah Hay-Drummond
- Children: 6 daughters; 5 sons inc. George Hay Murray
- Education: Harrow School; Christ Church, Oxford

George Murray (12 January 1784 – 16 February 1860) was an Anglican bishop. He was Bishop of Rochester from 1827 until his death in 1860. He was previously the Archdeacon of Man, Dean of Worcester and Bishop of Sodor and Man.

== Background and education ==
Murray was born in Farnham, Surrey, the second son of Lord George Murray, Bishop of St David's, himself the second son of John Murray, 3rd Duke of Atholl, Chief of Clan Murray. Murray's mother, Anne Charlotte (d.1844), was the daughter of Francis Grant (MP and general); she served as Lady-in-Waiting to Charlotte of Mecklenburg-Strelitz (wife of George III). Murray's youngest sister was Amelia was also a courtier, and a writer.

Murray attended Harrow before matriculating at Christ Church, Oxford, on 22 December 1801, graduating Bachelor of Arts (BA) in 1806, proceeding Oxford Master of Arts (MA Oxon) in 1810, and Doctor of Divinity (DD) by diploma on 13 March 1814.

== Ministry ==
On 29 September 1808, Murray was installed, like his father, as the Archdeacon of Man; on 22 May 1813 he was nominated as Bishop of Sodor and Man by his cousin John Murray, 4th Duke of Atholl and consecrated on 6 March 1814. On 24 November 1827 he was elected Bishop of Rochester, receiving back the temporalities on 14 December 1827, and on 19 March 1828 was appointed Dean of Worcester, being succeeded in 1845 by John Peel.

While commending the character of the leaders of the Oxford Movement, Murray attacked some of the Tracts for the Times, especially Nos. 81 and 90, in his episcopal charge of October 1843. Several of his sermons and charges were published.

== Family ==
Murray married, on 5 May 1811, Sarah Hay-Drummond, second daughter of Robert Hay-Drummond, 10th Earl of Kinnoull (by his wife Sarah Harley, daughter and co-heiress of Thomas Harley, Lord Mayor of London), by whom he had five sons and six daughters, including:

- Rev. George Edward Murray (1818–1854), Rector of Southfleet, Kent, who was the great-great-grandfather of the 10th duke, and the great-grandfather of the 11th duke, John Murray.
- Canon Francis Henry Murray (1820–1902), rector of Chislehurst from 1846 to his death in 1902, rural Dean of Dartford from 1887 to 1902, and honorary canon of Canterbury Cathedral.
- Herbert Harley Murray (1829–1904), Governor of Newfoundland and Chairman of England's Board of Customs.
- Rev. Frederick William Murray (1831–1913) was the grandfather of Sir Francis Ralph Hay Murray.
- Harriet Murray (1813–1854) who married George Pratt, 2nd Marquess Camden
- Eleanor Margaret Murray(died 1895) (youngest daughter), married John Jolliffe Tufnell of Langleys in Essex. They had 10 children and he already had 7 children from his previous marriage; their daughter, Louisa Tufnell, married the Hon Edward Strutt, co-founder of Strutt & Parker (estate agents).

After a protracted illness, Murray died at his town residence in Chester Square, London, on 16 February 1860, aged 76. He was buried in the family vault at Kensal Green.

== See also ==
- Rochester Cathedral
- Duke of Atholl

Church of England titles
| Preceded by Claudius Crigan | Bishop of Sodor and Man; 1813–1827 | Succeeded by William Ward |
| Preceded by Hugh Percy | Bishop of Rochester; 1827–1860 | Succeeded by Joseph Wigram |
| Preceded by James Hook | Dean of Worcester; 1828–1845 | Succeeded by John Peel |
