= Atholl Highlanders =

Scottish private military unit

The Atholl Highlanders
- Cap Badge of the Atholl Highlanders
- Active: 1839–present
- Country: Scotland
- Type: Ceremonial Infantry
- Role: Personal bodyguard
- Size: One company
- Part of: Private army
- Garrison/HQ: Blair Atholl
- Mottos: Furth Fortune and Fill the Fetters
- March: The Atholl Highlanders

Commanders
- Current commander: Lieutenant Colonel The Earl of Kinnoull
- Colonel-in-Chief: Bruce Murray, 12th Duke of Atholl

Insignia
- Tartan: Murray of Atholl

The Atholl Highlanders is a Scottish private ceremonial infantry regiment. The regiment is not part of the British Armed Forces but under the command of the Duke of Atholl, and based at Blair Castle, Blair Atholl. Although it has no military role, the men are armed with 19th-century Lee–Metford rifles, and the regiment includes a pipe band. Around the size of an army company, they are now a tourist attraction at Blair Castle, taking part in annual parades.

It acted as the personal bodyguard to the dukes, chiefs of the Clan Murray, who lived in Perthshire for roughly seven centuries. Joining the Highlanders is by invitation from the duke, who selects men with ties to the estate or the local area. The current duke lives in South Africa, and has travelled to inspect the Highlanders at their annual parades. It has been described as the only legal private army in Europe.

== History ==
=== First raising as a regular regiment in the British Army ===
The regiment was raised in Perthshire by John Murray, 4th Duke of Atholl as the 77th Regiment of Foot (or Atholl Highlanders, or Murray's Highlanders) in December 1777. The regiment was formed as a relief for other regiments serving in North America, and spent most of its existence in Ireland. The terms upon which the regiment was raised stated that the men were to be employed for either three years or the duration of the war in America. In 1781, the original three-year term ended, and the men expected the regiment to be disbanded. However, the regiment was transported to England and marched to Portsmouth to be embarked for service in India. Upon learning of this, the men mutinied, and the embarkation orders were countermanded. The regiment was marched to Berwick, where it disbanded in 1783.

=== Second raising as a private regiment of the Duke of Atholl ===
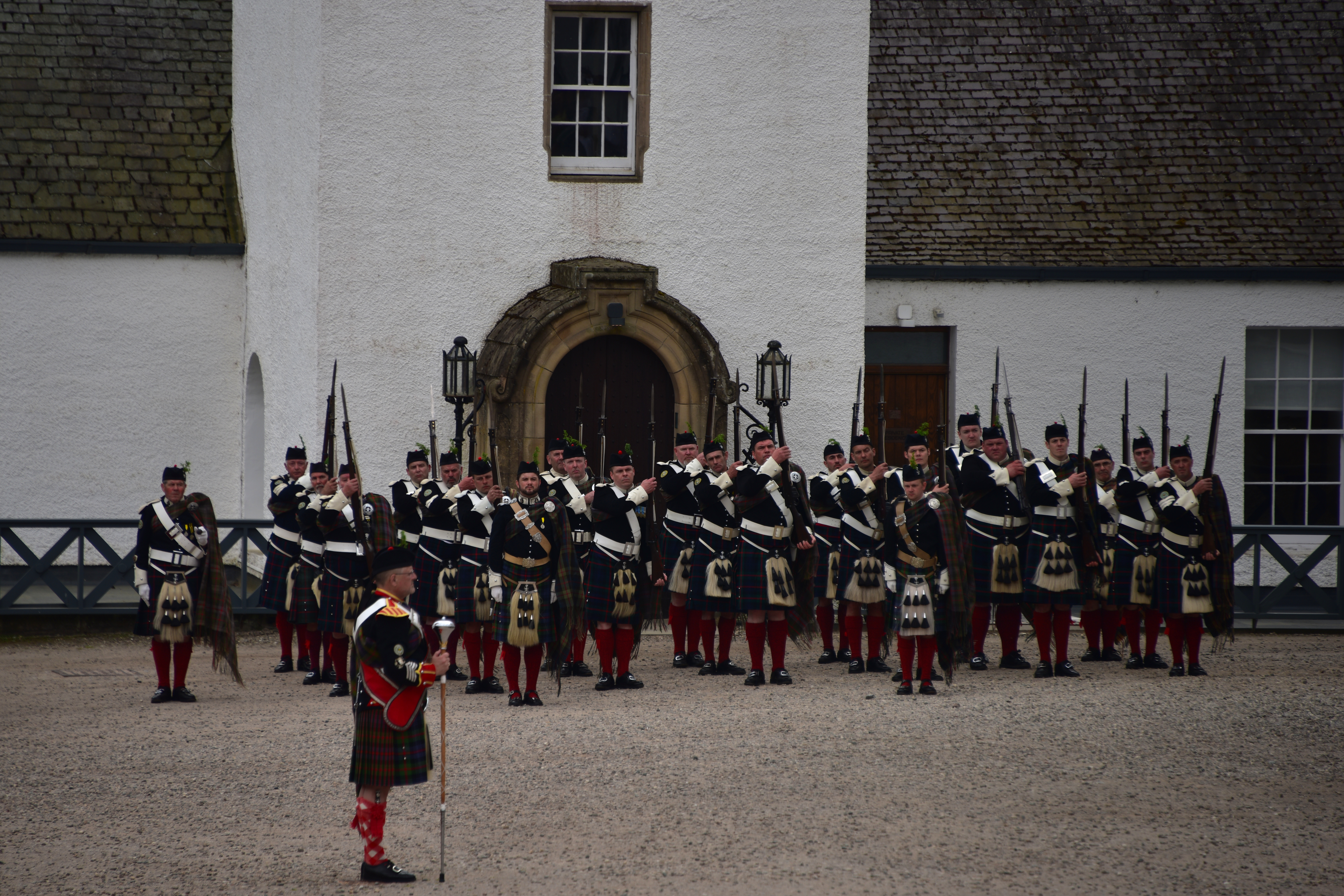
The Atholl Highlanders on parade in 2017

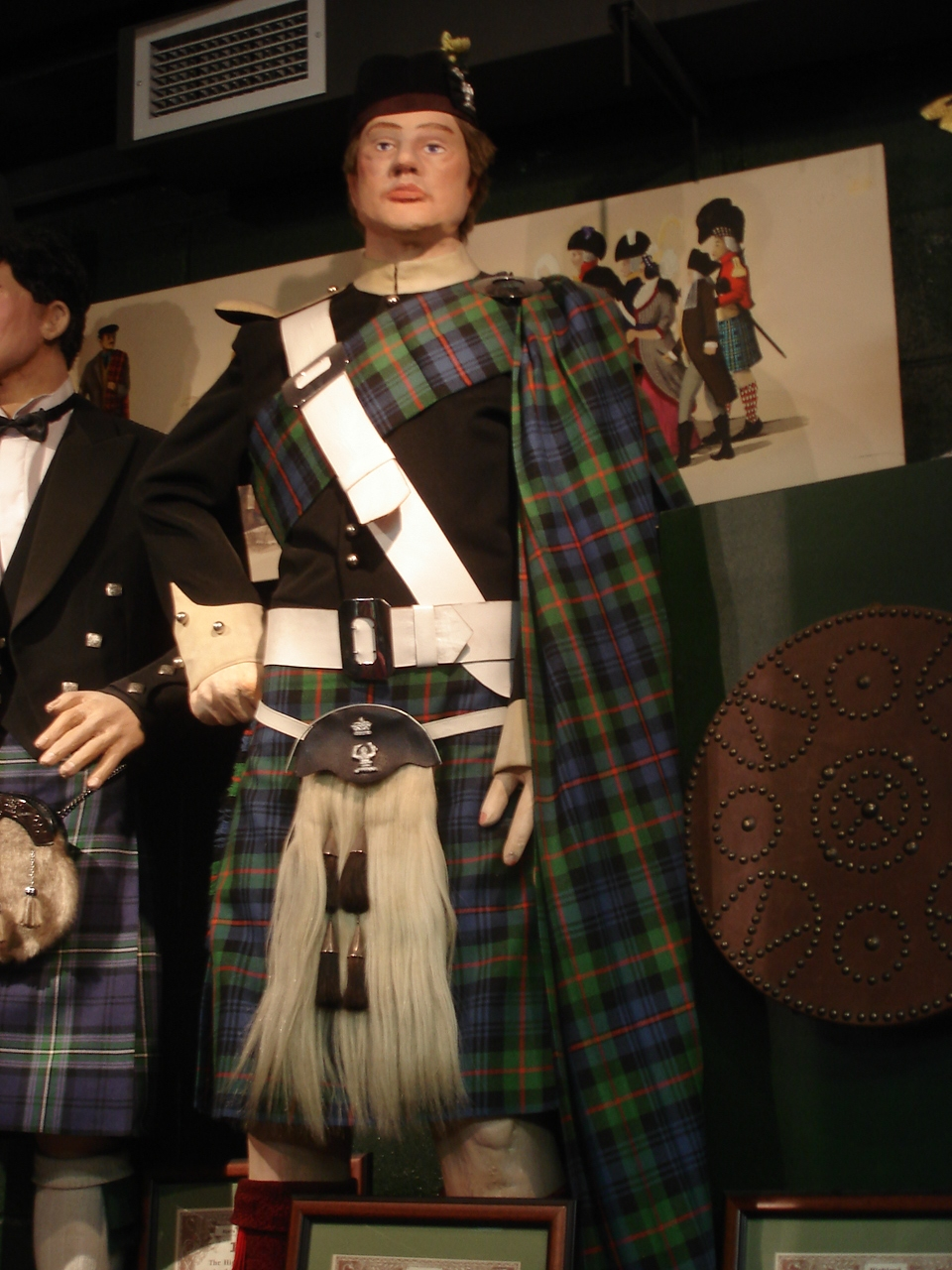
The full dress of the Atholl Highlanders

More than 50 years later, in 1839, George Murray, 6th Duke of Atholl, as Lord Glenlyon, re-formed the regiment as a bodyguard which he took to the Eglinton Tournament at Eglinton Castle, Ayrshire. Three years later, in 1842, the regiment escorted Queen Victoria during her tour of Perthshire and, in 1844, when the Queen stayed as a guest of the Duke at Blair Castle, the regiment mounted the guard for the entire duration of her stay. In recognition of the service that the regiment provided during her two visits, the Queen announced that she would present the Atholl Highlanders with colours, thus giving the regiment official Scottish regiment status, in perpetuity. The regiment's first stand of colours was presented by Lady Glenlyon in 1845. It received new colours in 1979 from Myra Butter, the wife of the Lord Lieutenant of Perth and Kinross. A third stand of colours was presented in 2006 by the Duchess of Atholl.

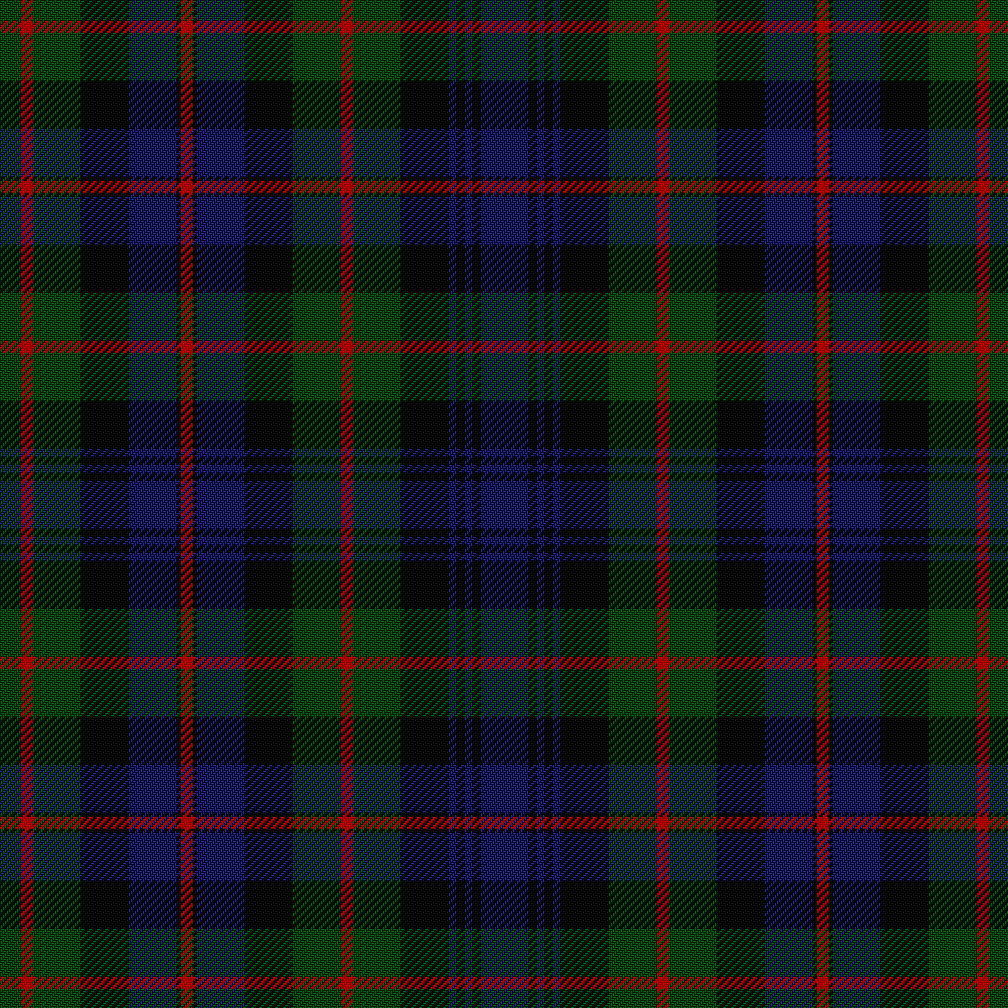
Murray of Atholl tartan, used in the uniforms of the Atholl Highlanders since 1839

Under John Stewart-Murray, 7th Duke, the regiment regularly provided guards for royal visitors to Blair Castle (which was a convenient stopping point on the journey to Balmoral). The regiment also attended the Braemar Gathering, while the annual Atholl Gathering was held in the first week in September in which the regiment paraded, then participated in various trials of strength and stamina. Following the First World War, parades of the regiment became fewer, although it did provide guards when the Crown Prince of Japan and King Faisal of Iraq visited Blair Castle in 1921 and 1933 respectively.

After many years of inactivity the regiment remained in abeyance until in 1966, when it was reformed by Iain Murray, 10th Duke of Atholl. The 10th Duke made the decision to revive the regiment’s annual parade. To this effect eight local men mostly estate employees and all with previous military service training were invited to join, seven accepted. They paraded on 8 April 1966 at Blair Castle for the first time in 33 years. They marched past the Duke led by two Atholl Highlander pipers. In 1973 the regiment returned to the Braemar Gathering and took part in a march past in front of the Queen and other members of the royal family. The Atholl Gathering was re-introduced at Target Park in June 1984.

It was feared that the regiment would be disbanded following the 10th Duke's death in 1996, until his successor, John Murray, 11th Duke of Atholl, wrote to the estate trustees insisting that he would continue his traditional role. The 11th Duke, although resident in South Africa, visited Blair Atholl almost every year to inspect the regiment's annual parade until his death. The 12th Duke continues this tradition.

The Atholl Highlanders continue with the current Duke of Atholl as their Colonel-in-Chief.

== Alliances ==
- South Africa – Solomon Mahlangu Regiment (formerly the Transvaal Scottish)
- United Kingdom – Fife and Forfar Yeomanry/Scottish Horse

== See also ==
- Military history of Scotland
- Lonach Highlanders
- Clan Murray
