= 1958 Scottish representative peer by-election =

A by-election for a Scottish representative peer took place on 1 October 1958 at the Palace of Holyroodhouse in Edinburgh. The election was caused by the death of Archibald Murray, 16th Lord Sinclair. It turned out to be the last by-election for representative peers before all holders of titles in the Peerage of Scotland were made eligible to sit in the House of Lords in 1963.

== Procedure ==
The date, time and place of the meeting was set in a Royal Proclamation of 11 September 1958, issued by the Queen at Balmoral Castle. The Duke of Buccleuch and Queensberry, who held the role of Lord Clerk Register, presided. When the Principal Clerk of Session George Macdonald read the roll of Peers of Scotland, 115 names were read, and 18 answered that they were present - the highest number at a byelection since 1890. Peers present were also asked to produce any proxies for those who were absent, and Lord Saltoun was admitted as a proxy for Lord Sempill. In addition 29 Peers had submitted "Signed Lists" as a form of absent voting.

Unusually the Duke of Buccleuch chose to vote in the election; it was tradition since 1879 for the Lord Clerk Register not to vote, but several previous Lords Clerk Register had broken it.

== Result ==
The 48 voting peers distributed their votes among six peers; after the process had concluded, the Lord Clerk Register noted that the Earl of Mar and Kellie, Lord Sinclair, and Lord Belhaven, "had not in fact been candidates for election".

Peer	Votes
Duke of Atholl	31
Unsuccessful
Earl of Northesk	7
Earl of Dundonald	6
Earl of Mar and Kellie	2
Lord Sinclair	1
Lord Belhaven and Stenton	1

== Votes cast ==
Peer voting	Peers voted for					
	Atholl, D.	Mar (1565) and Kellie, E.	Northesk, E.	Dundonald, E.	Sinclair, L.	Belhaven, L.
Peers present who answered to the calling of their titles
Hamilton, D.	1					
Buccleuch, D.	1					
Atholl, D.	1					
Cassilis, E.			1			
Moray, E.	1					
Haddington, E.	1					
Dumfries, E	1					
Wemyss, E.	1					
Northesk, E.			1			
Dundee, E.				1		
Dundonald, E.				1		
Breadalbane, E.				1		
Orkney, E.	1					
Rosebery, E.	1					
Arbuthnott, V.				1		
Saltoun, L.	1					
Balfour of Burleigh, L.	1					
Polwarth, L.	1					
Peers called as Proxies
Saltoun, L. (Proxy for Sempill, L.)	1					
Peers who had submitted Signed Lists
Argyll, D.			1			
Huntly, M.	1					
Lothian, M.			1			
Crawford, E.	1					
Mar, E.	1					
Rothes, E.	1					
Caithness, E.					1	
Mar and Kellie, E.	1					
Perth, E.	1					
Abercorn, E.	1					
Galloway, E.				1		
Lindsay, E.				1		
Southesk, E.			1			
Airlie, E.	1					
Selkirk, E.			1			
Aberdeen, E.		1				
Stair, E.	1					
Glasgow, E.	1					
Hopetoun, E.	1					
Stormont, V.	1					
Forbes, L.	1					
Sinclair, L.	1					
Herries, L.	1					
Elphinstone, L.	1					
Napier, L.						1
Fairfax of Cameron, L.			1			
Elibank, L.		1				
Rollo, L.	1					
Kinnaird, L.	1					

== See also ==
- List of Scottish representative peers
