= Siege of Blair Castle =

1746 battle

- Part of the Jacobite rising of 1745
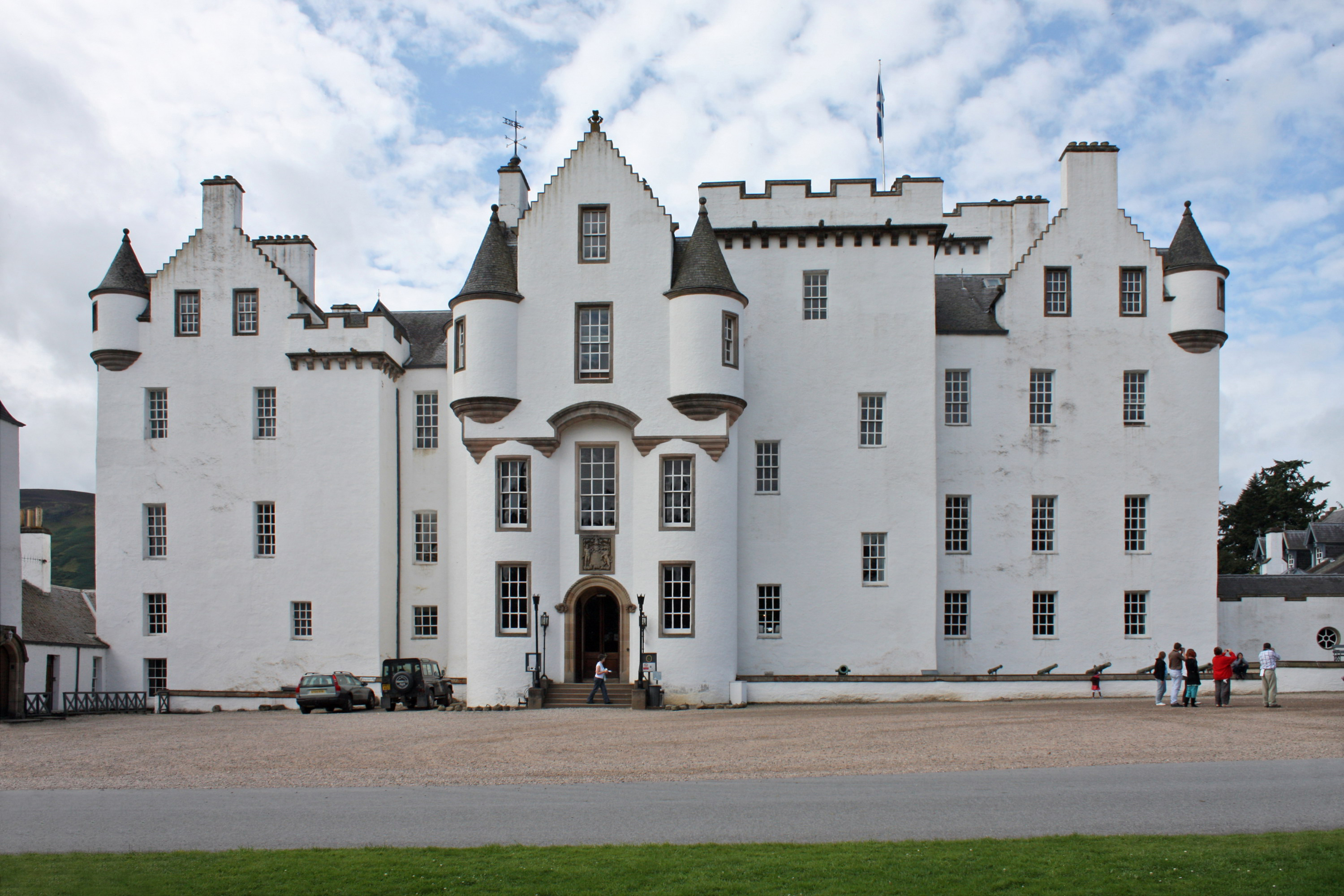
- Blair Castle
Date	17 March 1746 to 2 April 1746
Location	Blair Atholl, Perthshire, Scotland 56.7736°N 3.8578°W
Result	Jacobite forces withdrew, Government garrison relieved.

Belligerents
(Kingdom of Great Britain) Government: Royal Scots Fusiliers	Jacobites: Clan Murray; Clan Macpherson

Commanders and leaders
(Kingdom of Great Britain) Sir Andrew Agnew	Lord George Murray

Strength
300	1,000

Casualties and losses
Unknown	Unknown

The siege of Blair Castle was a conflict that took place in Scotland in March 1746 and was part of the Jacobite rising of 1745. It was fought between Scottish forces loyal to the British-Hanoverian government of George II of Great Britain, which defended Blair Castle near the village of Blair Atholl in Perthshire, and Scottish Jacobite forces loyal to the House of Stuart.

== Background ==
In February 1746, Prince William, Duke of Cumberland, arrived at Perth in command of the king’s army. The Duke sent two detachments from several regiments of infantry to secure the area of Atholl. One detachment of 200 men, under the command of Lieutenant Colonel Webster, was sent to occupy Castle Menzies, home of the chief of the Clan Menzies, Sir Robert Menzies of Weem. This was in order to secure passage of the Tay bridge. A second detachment of 300 men commanded by Sir Andrew Agnew, 5th Baronet, who was Lieutenant Colonel of the Royal Scots Fusiliers (and chief of Clan Agnew), was sent to take up post at Blair Castle.

Blair Castle was the seat of James Murray, 2nd Duke of Atholl (chief of Clan Murray). The Duke of Atholl actually supported the British Government, but most of his clan supported the Jacobite House of Stuart and were under the command of his brother Lord George Murray.

== Siege ==
On the morning of 17 March, all of the detached outposts surrounding the castle were taken by surprise and captured by the Jacobites, and the government soldiers of the outposts were made prisoners. The rebel Jacobites then proceeded to fire at the castle from close range. The government garrison, now reduced to about 270, was ordered to different parts of the castle with orders not to fire unless they were attacked.

In the afternoon of the 17th, Lord George Murray and Ewen MacPherson of Cluny (chief of Clan Macpherson) had by this time set up their headquarters at the village of Blair, which is about a quarter of a mile to the southeast of the castle. They sent a summons to the castle requiring Andrew Agnew to surrender the castle, garrison, military stores, and provisions into the hands of Lord George Murray. The terms of surrender were refused by Agnew.

On 19 March, Agnew sent out a man on horse in an attempt to reach the Earl of Crawford, who was the general officer commanding some British cavalry and Hessian troops, supposedly at Perth or Dunkeld. However, this was assumed to have failed when a short time later a Jacobite was seen on the horse that the messenger had been sent out on.

On 1 April, news reached the garrison that Lord George Murray and his men had left Blair. This is believed to have been because Murray had received an order to join the forces of the Young Pretender Charles Edward Stuart near Inverness.

On 2 April, George Lindsay-Crawford, 21st Earl of Crawford, arrived with cavalry to relieve the garrison. It turned out that the man sent out by Agnew had fallen from his horse when being fired at by the Jacobites. The messenger escaped on foot and was able to make contact with Crawford. Agnew's men had been close to starvation when the siege was lifted.

== Aftermath ==
Lord George Murray and his men met up with the army of Charles Edward Stuart and were defeated a few weeks later at the Battle of Culloden. The Royal Scots Fusiliers also fought at Culloden, but on the British Government side.
