= James Hook (priest) =

English Anglican priest

The Very Reverend James Hook FRS FSA
- Dean of Worcester
- Church: Church of England
- Diocese: Diocese of Worcester
- In office: 1825 to 1828
- Predecessor: John Jenkinson
- Successor: George Murray

Orders
- Ordination: 1796

Personal details
- Born: 16 June 1771
- Died: 5 February 1828 (aged 56)
- Denomination: Anglicanism
- Education: Westminster School; St Mary Hall, Oxford

James Hook, FRS, FSA (16 June 1771 – 5 February 1828) was an English Anglican priest. He was Dean of Worcester from 1825 until his death.

== Early life and education ==
The son of the composer James Hook, he was born 16 June 1771. He was educated at Westminster School and St Mary Hall, Oxford.

== Ordained ministry ==
He was ordained in 1796. He married the daughter of the prominent Scottish physician Walter Farquhar. After having held several livings in 1814 he became Archdeacon of Huntingdon; and in 1817 Rector of Whippingham.

An amateur mountaineer, novelist and composer, he died on 5 February 1828. His brother and son also achieved eminence in their respective fields.

Church of England titles
Preceded by John Jenkinson	Dean of Worcester; 1825–1828	Succeeded by George Murray
