= Iain Murray, 10th Duke of Atholl =

Scottish peer and landowner

His Grace The Duke of Atholl DL
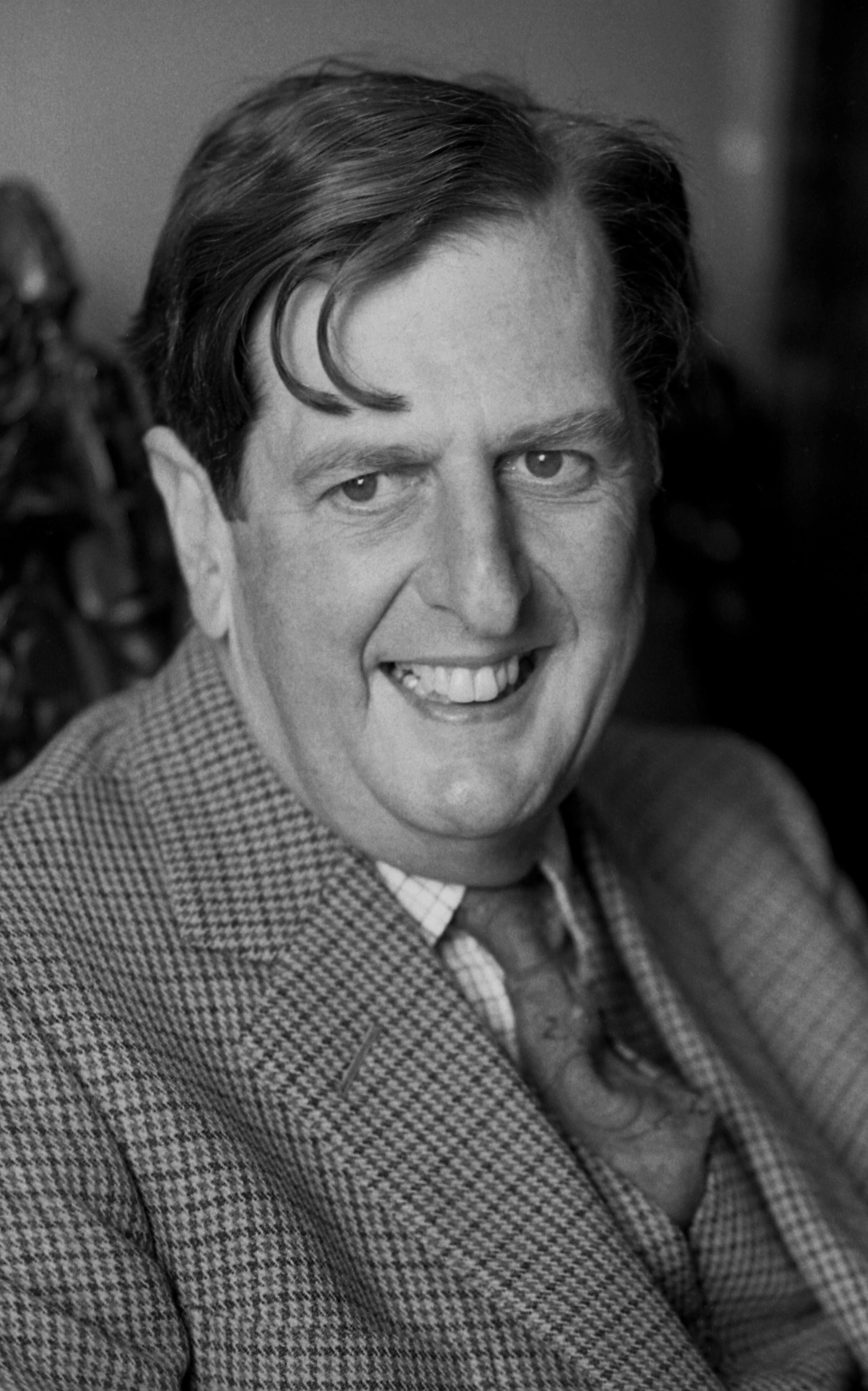
- The Duke of Atholl
- Preceded by: James Stewart-Murray, 9th Duke of Atholl
- Succeeded by: John Murray, 11th Duke of Atholl

Personal details
- Born: 19 June 1931 London, England
- Died: 27 February 1996 (aged 64) Perth, Scotland
- Party: Conservative
- Education: Christ Church, Oxford

George Iain Murray, 10th Duke of Atholl, DL (19 June 1931 – 27 February 1996), known as Wee Iain, was a Scottish peer and landowner.

He was also Marquess and Earl of Atholl, Marquess and Earl of Tullibardine, and Earl of Strathtay and Strathardle.

== Background and education ==
Murray was the only surviving child of Lieutenant-Colonel George Anthony Murray, who was killed in action in the Second World War, and the Honourable Angela Pearson, daughter of Weetman Pearson, 2nd Viscount Cowdray. He was a great-grandson of Sir George Murray, who was himself a grandson of the Right Reverend George Murray, Bishop of Rochester, son of the Right Reverend Bishop Lord George Murray, second son of John Murray, 3rd Duke of Atholl, who was the eldest son of the Scottish Jacobite Lord George Murray. Through his American great-grandfather, Brigadier General Daniel M. Frost of the Confederate States Army, he was a descendant of the Winthrop family and a distant cousin to former Secretary of State John Kerry.

The young Murray was educated at Eton College and Christ Church, Oxford, before in 1957 succeeding James Stewart-Murray, 9th Duke of Atholl, his fourth cousin twice removed, as Duke of Atholl. With a height of six feet, five inches, he was one of the tallest Scottish peers, leading to the whimsical name of "Wee Iain".

== Public life ==
Atholl inherited an estate of approximately 120,000 acres (490 km^{2})—although this was a decline from the 190,000 acres (770 km^{2}) in the 19th century, it was still a smaller decline than many other Scottish estates. Under his stewardship, the estate in and around Blair Castle became a significant area for tourism and forestry, on which he was an acknowledged expert and spoke many times in the House of Lords, having been elected a Scottish representative peer in 1958. In addition, he resurrected the Atholl Highlanders, the ceremonial private army of the dukedom composed of estate workers and family friends, as a tourist attraction.

He was an active member of the Conservative Monday Club. He also held several business appointments, notably as Chairman of BPM Holdings between 1972 and 1983 and of Westminster Press Group between 1974 and 1996 and as a director of Pearson Longman between 1975 and 1983. In 1980 he was appointed a deputy lieutenant of Perth and Kinross.

== Personal life ==
Atholl died unmarried in February 1996, aged 64, with the titles passing to his second cousin, once removed, John Murray, a South African land surveyor. The day before the death of the 10th Duke, it was announced that he had given Blair Castle and most of his estates to a charitable trust, thus effectively disinheriting his heir. The new duke had indicated he had little interest in leaving South Africa, and though he honoured the land of his origins, said: "I am a South African, not a Scotsman."

== Sources ==
- "Atholl". Who Was Who. Oxford University Press. December 2007.
- "Obituary". The Independent. 28 February 1996.

Peerage of Scotland
Preceded by James Stewart-Murray	Duke of Atholl; 1957–1996	Succeeded by John Murray
