= Conquer the Castle =

2008 British reality TV series

- Genre: Reality
- Narrated by: Alison Craig
- Country of origin: Scotland
- No. of series: 1
- No. of episodes: 12

Production
- Running time: 30 minutes (including adverts)
- Production company: STV Studios

Original release
- Network: STV
- Release: 3 January 2008

Conquer the Castle is a British reality TV series filmed in Scotland, and broadcast on STV.

It is a 12-part series following six city people experiencing Scottish country living. The contestants compete against each other in tasks, including hunting and wilderness survival.

The person who won the competition "Conquered the Castle" and win the competition.
