= Bruce Murray, 12th Duke of Atholl =

South African-born businessman and peer

His Grace The Duke of Atholl OStJ
- Preceded by: John Murray, 11th Duke of Atholl

Personal details
- Born: Bruce George Ronald Murray; 6 April 1960 (age 66) Louis Trichardt, South Africa
- Parents: John Murray, 11th Duke of Atholl; Margaret Yvonne Leach

Bruce George Ronald Murray, 12th Duke of Atholl OStJ (born 5/6 April 1960) is a South African businessman and peer who is the chief of Clan Murray. As Duke of Atholl, he has the right to raise Europe's only legal private army, the Atholl Highlanders, a unique privilege granted to his family by Queen Victoria after visiting Blair Atholl in 1844.

== Early life and career ==
The elder son of John Murray, 11th Duke of Atholl, and Margaret Yvonne (née Leach), now styled the Dowager Duchess of Atholl, graduated from Jeppe High School for Boys, Johannesburg, in 1979. He was educated at Saasveld Forestry College before serving his two years' National Service with the South African Infantry Corps. He is currently a volunteer member of the Transvaal Scottish Regiment, holding the rank of lieutenant. Previously, he managed a tea plantation, but then ran a signage business producing signs for commercial buildings. He was commissioned into the Atholl Highlanders in 2000, being appointed as lieutenant colonel. Upon the death of his father on 15 May 2012, he succeeded to all his father's titles, becoming the 12th Duke of Atholl.

== Marriages and children ==
The Duke first married on 4 February 1984, in Johannesburg, Lynne Elizabeth Andrew, elder daughter of Nicholas Andrew; Together they had two sons and one daughter. They were divorced in 2003.

In 2009, he married secondly Charmaine Myrna du Toit, daughter of Dirk Du Toit, without issue. They were divorced in 2016.

== Honours ==
- Officer of the Order of St John, December 2015

Peerage of Scotland
Preceded by John Murray	Duke of Atholl; 2012–present	Incumbent; Heir apparent: Michael Murray, Marquess of Tullibardine
