= Duke of Atholl =

Title in the Peerage of Scotland held by the head of Clan Murray

Dukedom of Atholl
- Quarterly: 1st, Paly of six Or and Sable (for Atholl); 2nd, Or a Fess chequy Azure and Argent (for Stewart); 3rd, Argent on a Bend Azure three Stags' Heads cabossed Or (for Stanley); 4th, Gules three Legs in armour Proper garnished and spurred Or flexed and conjoined in triangle at the upper part of the thigh (ensigns of the Isle of Man); over all, an Inescutcheon en surtout Azure three Mullets Argent within a Double tressure flory Or ensigned of a Marquess's coronet (for Chiefship of Murray).
- Creation date: 1703
- Created by: Anne
- Peerage: Peerage of Scotland
- First holder: John Murray, 2nd Marquess of Atholl
- Present holder: Bruce Murray, 12th Duke
- Heir apparent: Michael Bruce John Murray, Marquess of Tullibardine
- Remainder to: the 1st Duke's heirs male of the body lawfully begotten, with special remainder to the heirs male of the body lawfully begotten of the 1st Marquess
- Subsidiary titles: Marquess of Tullibardine; Marquess of Atholl; Earl of Strathtay and Strathardle; Earl of Tullibardine; Earl of Atholl; Viscount of Balquhidder, Glenalmond and Glenlyn; Viscount of Balquhidder; Lord Murray, Balvenie and Gask; Lord Murray, Gask and Balquhidder; Lord Murray of Tullibardine
- Seat: Blair Castle
- Former seat: Dunkeld House

Duke of Atholl, named after Atholl in Scotland, is a title in the Peerage of Scotland held by the head of Clan Murray. It was created by Queen Anne in 1703 for John Murray, 2nd Marquess of Atholl, with a special remainder to the heir male of his father, the 1st Marquess.

The Duke's eldest son and heir apparent uses the courtesy title Marquess of Tullibardine. The heir apparent to Lord Tullibardine uses the courtesy title Earl of Strathtay and Strathardle (usually shortened to Earl of Strathtay). Lord Strathtay's heir apparent uses the courtesy title Viscount Balquhidder. The Duke of Atholl is the hereditary chief of Clan Murray.

== Family history ==
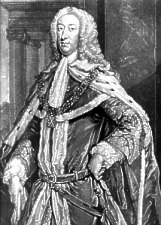
James Murray, 2nd Duke of Atholl, KT

The Dukes of Atholl belong to an ancient Scottish family. Sir William Murray of Castleton married Lady Margaret, daughter of John Stewart, 1st Earl of Atholl (see Earl of Atholl). Sir William was one of the many Scottish noblemen killed at the Battle of Flodden in 1513. His son Sir William Murray lived at Tullibardine in Perthshire. The latter's grandson, Sir John Murray, was created Lord Murray of Tullibardine in 1604 and Lord Murray, Gask and Balquhidder and Earl of Tullibardine in 1606. All three titles were in the Peerage of Scotland. He was succeeded by his eldest son, William Murray (1574–1628), the second Earl of Tullibardine. He married as his third wife Lady Dorothea, daughter of John Stewart, 5th and last Earl of Atholl. Charles I agreed to revive the earldom of Atholl in favour of Lord Tullibardine's children by Lady Dorothea. Tullibardine consequently resigned his titles in favour of his younger brother, Patrick Murray, who was created Lord Murray of Gask and Earl of Tullibardine in 1628, with remainder to his heirs male whatsoever and presumably with the precedence of 1606. John Murray, son of the second Earl of Tullibardine by Lady Dorothea Stewart, was created Earl of Atholl in the Peerage of Scotland in 1629. He was succeeded by his son, the second Earl of Atholl. In 1670 he succeeded his cousin James Murray, 2nd Earl of Tullibardine, as third (or fifth) Earl of Tullibardine. In 1676 he was created Lord Murray, Balveny and Gask, Viscount of Balquhidder, Earl of Tullibardine and Marquess of Atholl, with remainder to the heirs male of his body. All titles were in the Peerage of Scotland. Lord Atholl married Lady Amelia Anne Sophia, daughter of James Stanley, 7th Earl of Derby (and 1st Baron Strange).

On his death the titles passed to his eldest son, the second Marquess. He had already been created Lord Murray, Viscount Glenalmond and Earl of Tullibardine for life in the peerage of Scotland in 1696. In 1703 he was made Lord Murray, Balvenie and Gask, in the County of Perth, Viscount of Balwhidder, Glenalmond and Glenlyon, in the County of Perth, Earl of Strathtay and Strathardle, in the County of Perth, Marquess of Tullibardine, in the County of Perth, and Duke of Atholl, with remainder failing heirs male of his own to the heirs male of his father. All five titles were in the Peerage of Scotland. His eldest surviving son and heir apparent, William Murray, Marquess of Tullibardine, took part in the Jacobite rising of 1715. He was charged with high treason and attainted by Act of Parliament. An Act of Parliament was also passed to remove him from the succession to his father's titles. William was, on 1 February 1717, created Duke of Rannoch, Marquis of Blair, Earl of Glen Tilt, Viscount of Glenshie, and Lord Strathbran in the Jacobite Peerage. The first Duke was consequently succeeded by his third son, James, the second Duke. In 1736 he also succeeded his kinsman James Stanley, 10th Earl of Derby as 7th Baron Strange and as Lord of Mann. On the death of his brother William in 1746, he succeeded to the Jacobite titles, such as they were. The Duke's two sons both died in infancy. His eldest daughter Lady Charlotte succeeded him in the barony of Strange and the lordship of Mann. Atholl died in 1764 and was succeeded in the dukedom and remaining titles by his nephew, John, the third Duke. He was the eldest son of Lt-Gen Lord George Murray, sixth son of the first Duke (who had been attainted for his participation in the Jacobite Rebellion of 1715), the same year he succeeded the House of Lords decided that he should be allowed to succeed in the titles despite his father's attainder. He married his first cousin, the aforementioned Charlotte Murray, Baroness Strange. They sold their sovereignty over the Isle of Man to the British Crown for £70,000.

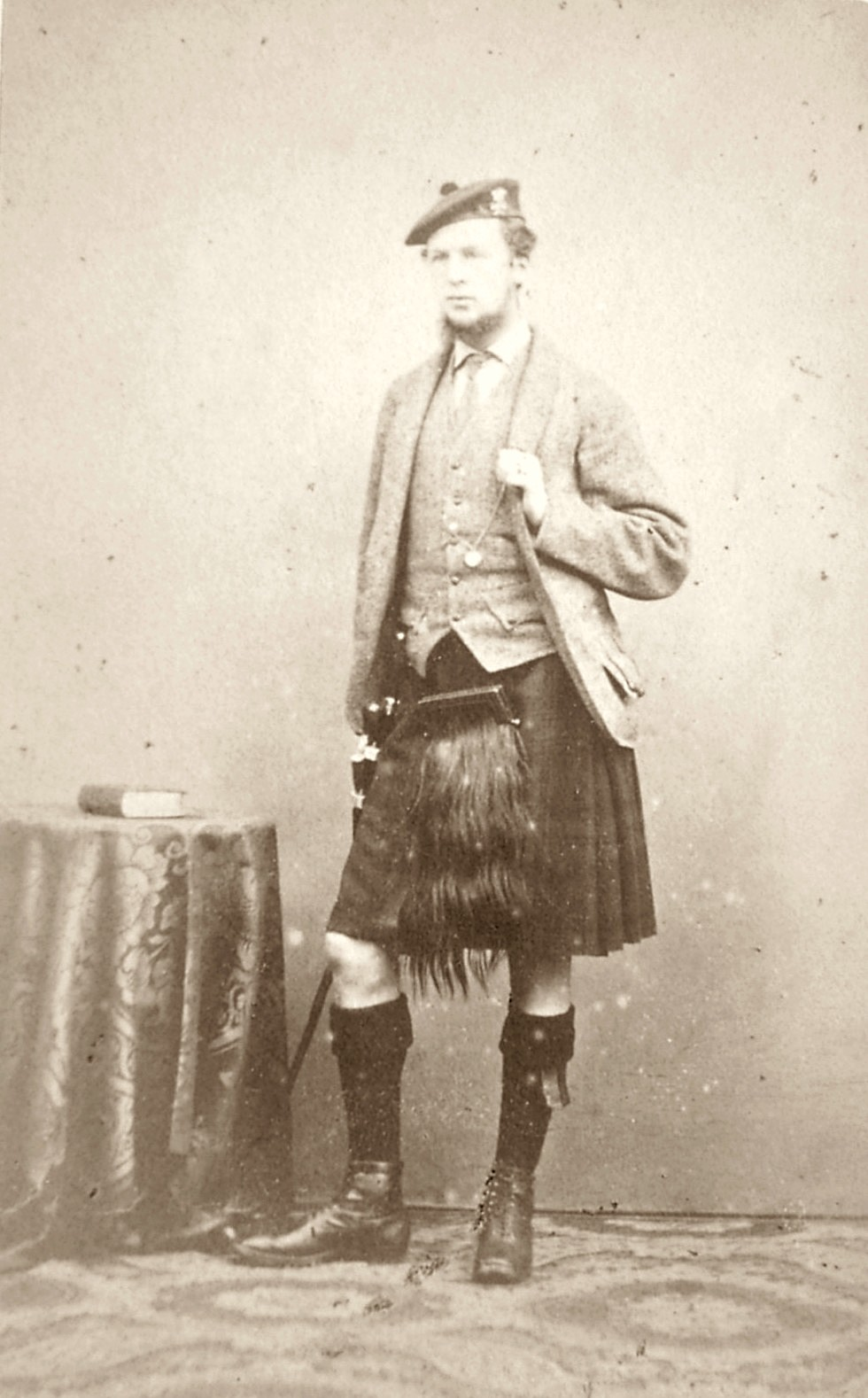
John Stewart-Murray, 7th Duke of Atholl, KT

The Duke and Duchess were both succeeded by their eldest son John, the fourth Duke. In 1786 he was created Baron Murray, of Stanley in the County of Gloucester, and Earl Strange in the Peerage of Great Britain. These titles gave him a seat in the House of Lords. Atholl sold his remaining properties and privileges in the Isle of Man to the British Crown for £409,000. He was succeeded on his death in 1829 by his eldest son, John, the fifth Duke. He had already in 1798 been declared to have been of an "unsound mind". The fifth Duke never married and was succeeded by his nephew, George Murray, 2nd Baron Glenlyon, the eldest son of James Murray, 1st Baron Glenlyon, second son of the fourth Duke, who had been created Baron Glenlyon, of Glenlyon in the County of Perth, in the Peerage of the United Kingdom in 1821. Lord Glenlyon married Lady Emily Frances Percy, daughter of Hugh Percy, 2nd Duke of Northumberland and 3rd Baron Percy.

The sixth Duke was succeeded by his only child, John, the seventh Duke. In 1865 he succeeded as sixth Baron Percy through his grandmother aforesaid. The same year he registered the additional surname of Stewart at the Lyon Court. In 1893 he resumed the original spelling of the title, "Atholl" instead of "Athole". He was succeeded by his second but eldest surviving son, John, the eighth Duke, who died childless in 1942 and was succeeded by his youngest brother, James, the ninth Duke. James never married, and on his death in 1957 the baronies of Murray and Glenlyon and earldom of Strange became extinct, the barony of Percy was passed on to his kinsman Hugh Percy, 10th Duke of Northumberland, while the barony of Strange fell into abeyance (see Baron Strange).

The dukedom of Atholl and remaining titles were passed on to the late Duke's fourth cousin twice removed, Iain Murray, the tenth Duke of Atholl. He was the grandson of Sir Evelyn Murray, son of Sir George Murray, grandson of Dr George Murray, Bishop of Rochester, son of Bishop Lord George Murray, second son of the third Duke. As all the English titles had become extinct on the ninth Duke's death, the tenth Duke was not entitled to an automatic seat in the House of Lords, gaining in 1957 the then unfortunate distinction of being the highest ranking peer without a seat in the upper chamber of parliament. However, in 1958 Atholl was elected a Scottish representative peer and was able to take a seat in the House of Lords. Through the Peerage Act 1963 all hereditary Scottish peers gained the right to sit in the House of Lords. The tenth Duke was unmarried and was succeeded in 1996 by his second cousin once removed, John Murray, 11th Duke of Atholl. He was the grandson of the Rev. Douglas Stuart Murray, brother of the aforementioned Sir George Murray, great-grandfather of the tenth Duke. On his death in 2012, the eleventh Duke was succeeded by his eldest son, Bruce Murray, 12th Duke of Atholl.

=== Notable family members ===
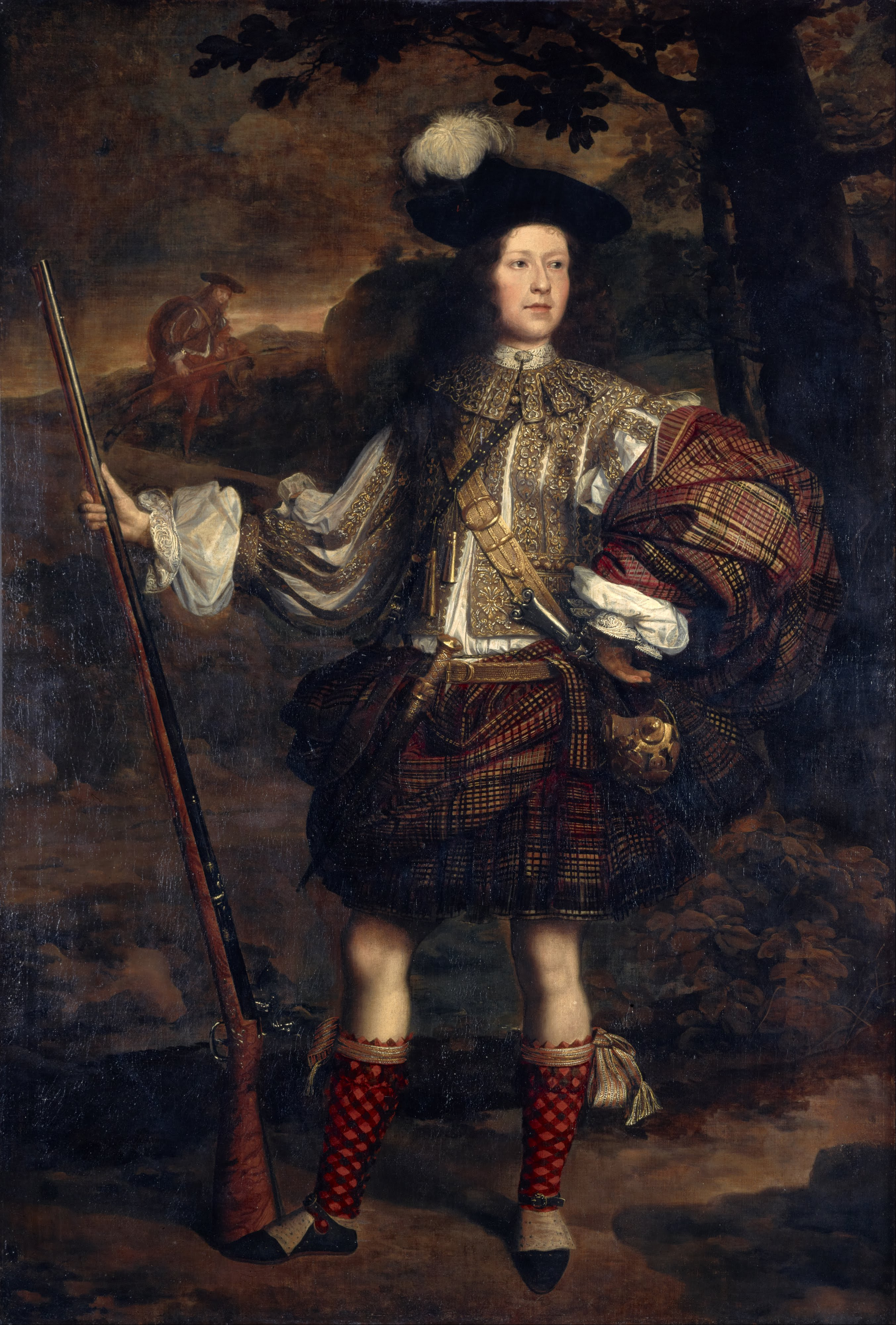
Lord Mungo Murray (Am Morair Mungo Moireach),1668-1700 wearing a belted plaid about 1680. Son of 1st Marquess of Atholl.

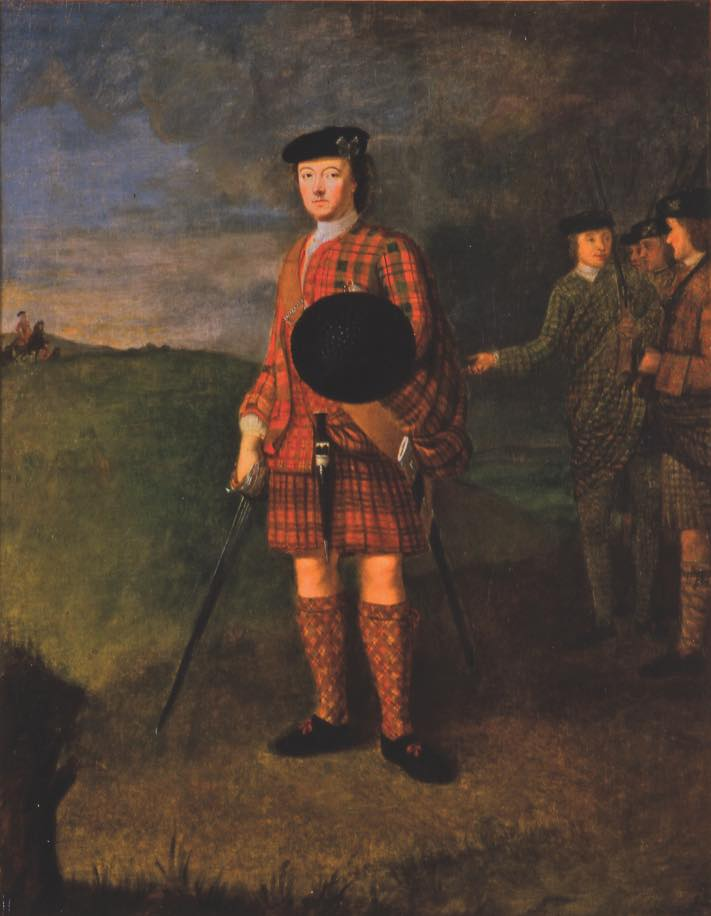
Lt-Gen Lord George Murray.

Mungo Murray, second son of the first Earl of Tullibardine of the first creation, succeeded as second Viscount of Stormont according to a special remainder in 1631, but died childless in 1642. Lord Charles Murray, second son of the first Marquess, was created Earl of Dunmore in 1686. Lord James Murray, third son of the first Marquess, was Member of Parliament for Perthshire. Lord William Murray, fourth son of the first Marquess, succeeded his father-in-law as Lord Nairne in 1683 but was attainted for taking part in the Jacobite Rising of 1715. Lord George Murray, fifth son of the first Duke and father of the third Duke, was a prominent Jacobite general. He was also the father of James Murray, a soldier and politician, and George Murray, a naval commander and politician. Lord John Murray, eighth son of the first Duke (and the eldest by his second wife), was a soldier and politician. Lord George Murray, second son of the third Duke, was Bishop of St David's. His eldest son George Murray was Bishop of Rochester. His fourth son Sir Herbert Harley Murray was Governor of Newfoundland. The actor Stephen Murray and diplomat Sir Ralph Murray were the grandsons of the Rev. Francis William Murray, son of George Murray, Bishop of Rochester. Comedian and prospective parliamentary candidate Al Murray is the grandson of former British Ambassador Sir Ralph Hay Murray.

James Arthur Murray (1790–1860), only son of Lord William Murray, third son of the third Duke, was a vice admiral in the Royal Navy. Lord Charles Murray-Aynsley, fifth son of the third Duke, was a clergyman. His son John Murray-Aynsley was the father of 1) Charles Murray-Aynsley (1821–1901), a vice-admiral in the Royal Navy; 2) George Herbert Murray-Aynsley (1826–1887), a major general in the Madras Army, and 3) Hugh Murray-Aynsley, a New Zealand politician. Sir George Murray, son of the Rev. George Edward Murray, son of George Murray, Bishop of Rochester, was a civil servant. His son Sir Evelyn Murray was secretary to the general post office between 1914 and 1934. Lord James Murray, second son of the fourth Duke, was a soldier and politician and was created Baron Glenlyon in 1821. Anne, Duchess of Atholl, VA, wife of the sixth Duke, was Mistress of the Robes to Queen Victoria. Dame Kitty Stewart-Murray, DBE, MP, wife of the eighth Duke, was Parliamentary Secretary to the Board of Education from 1924 to 1929, the first woman to serve in a Conservative and Unionist government.

=== Subsidiary titles ===
As of 2017, there were twelve subsidiary titles attached to the dukedom: Lord Murray of Tullibardine (1604), Lord Murray, Gask and Balquhidder (1628), Lord Murray, Balvany and Gask (1676), Lord Murray, Balvenie and Gask, in the County of Perth (1703), Viscount of Balquhidder (1676), Viscount of Balquhidder, Glenalmond and Glenlyon, in the County of Perth (1703), Earl of Atholl (1629), Earl of Tullibardine (1628), Earl of Tullibardine (1676), Earl of Strathtay and Strathardle, in the County of Perth (1703), Marquess of Atholl (1676) and Marquess of Tullibardine, in the County of Perth (1703). These titles are also in the Peerage of Scotland. The dukes have also previously held the following titles: Baron Strange (Peerage of England 1628) between 1736 and 1764 and 1805 and 1957; Baron Murray, of Stanley in the County of Gloucester, and Earl Strange (Peerage of Great Britain 1786) between 1786 and 1957, Baron Glenlyon, of Glenlyon in the County of Perth (Peerage of the United Kingdom 1821) between 1846 and 1957 and Baron Percy (Peerage of Great Britain 1722) between 1865 and 1957. From 1786 to 1957, the Dukes of Atholl sat in the House of Lords as Earl Strange.

== Estates and residences ==
=== Country seats ===
The Dukes of Atholl's family seat was historically Blair Castle in Perthshire. In the months prior to his death in 1996 the 10th Duke of Atholl placed Blair Castle and most of his estates in a charitable trust, shielding them from inheritance taxes and leaving them under Scottish control, as his heir John Murray, the 11th Duke, had indicated he had no desire to leave his native South Africa. His half-nephew Robert Troughton was the heir to the remaining estate.

The Earls and Dukes of Atholl have historically owned various other residences and castles, including Huntingtower Castle, Balvenie Castle, Tullibardine Castle and Dunkeld House (the latter two demolished).

=== Estates ===
In the 1883 edition of John Bateman's The Great Landowners of Great Britain and Ireland, John Stewart-Murray, 7th Duke of Atholl's estates were recorded as spanning 201,640 acres in Perthshire, which produced an annual income of £42,030.

=== Burial sites ===
The traditional burial place of the Dukes of Atholl is the Family Burial Ground (photo) next to the ruins of St Bride's Kirk in the grounds of Blair Castle. The ruin stands on a mound a little to the north-east of the castle, where a church has existed since at least 1134. St Bride's was the village church of Old Blair but fell into disuse after 1823 when the estate village was relocated to its current location.

=== Private army ===
The holder of the dukedom of Atholl also commands the only legal private army in Europe, the Atholl Highlanders, which is headquartered at Blair Castle.

=== London residences ===
In the mid-1820s the London residence of John Murray, 4th Duke of Atholl was No. 30 Great College Street; by 1827 the Duke had taken up residence at 13 St James's Square. Following his death in 1830 the house was sold by his executors for £17,500 in 1836, after which it became the premises of the Windham Club.

The London residence of John Stewart-Murray, 7th Duke of Atholl was No. 84 Eaton Place, Belgravia from c. 1876 until his death in 1917. His son and successor John Stewart-Murray, 8th Duke of Atholl continued to maintain the house as his London residence until late 1928. By November of the same year the 8th Duke and Duchess had taken No. 98 Elm Park Gardens as their London residence, which they retained until c. 1939.

Following the death of James Stewart-Murray, 9th Duke of Atholl in May 1957, he was succeeded by his fourth-cousin-twice-removed Iain Murray, 10th Duke of Atholl. The 10th Duke and his mother the Hon. Angela Campbell-Preston had maintained a London House at No. 104 Hamilton Terrace, St John's Wood since the mid-1940s, which continued to be the 10th Duke's London residence following his accession until the early 1970s. By 1974 the 10th Duke had purchased a new London House, No. 31 Marlborough Hill in St John's Wood, which remained as his London home until his death in 1996.

== List of titleholders ==
=== Earls of Tullibardine; first creation (1606) ===
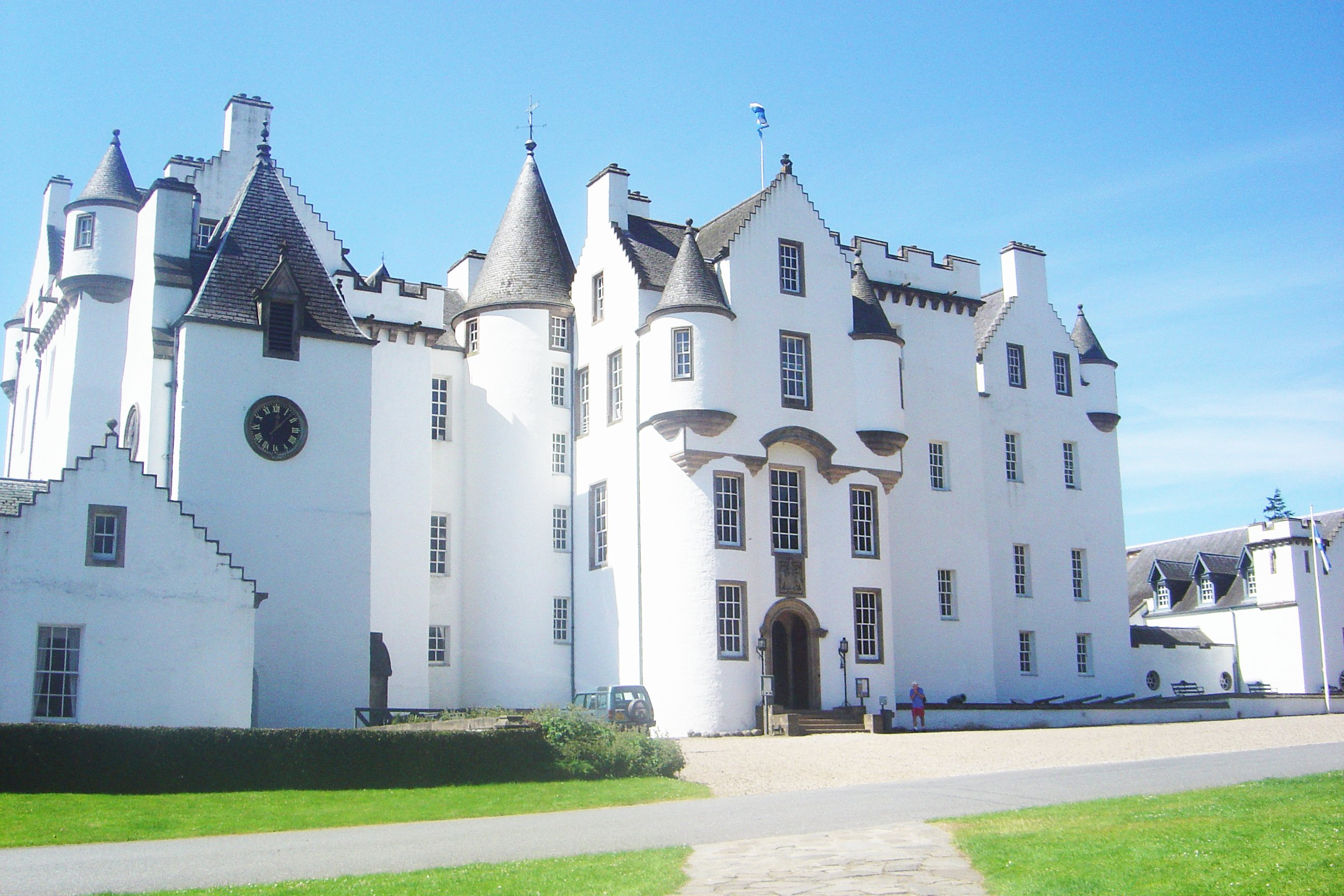
Blair Castle, Perthshire

- John Murray, 1st Earl of Tullibardine (died 1609)
- William Murray, 2nd Earl of Tullibardine (c. 1574–1626) (eldest son of the 1st Earl; resigned his titles in favour of younger brother in 1626)

=== Earls of Tullibardine; second creation (1628) ===
- Patrick Murray, 1st Earl of Tullibardine (1578–1644) (third son of the 1st Earl of Tullibardine of the first creation)
- James Murray, 2nd Earl of Tullibardine (1617–1670) (eldest son of the 1st Earl; died without surviving children)
  - Patrick Murray, Lord Murray and Gask (c. 1644–c. 1661–1664) (elder son of the 2nd Earl, died unmarried)
  - James Murray, Lord Murray and Gask (c. 1652–c. 1664–1670) (younger son of the 2nd Earl, died young)
- John Murray, 3rd Earl of Tullibardine (1631–1703) (first cousin of the 2nd Earl; became 2nd Earl of Atholl in 1642 and created Marquess of Atholl in 1676)

=== Earls of Atholl; tenth creation (1629) ===
- John Murray, 1st Earl of Atholl (died 1642) (son of the 2nd Earl of Tullibardine of the first creation)
- John Murray, 3rd Earl of Tullibardine, 2nd Earl of Atholl (1631–1703) (elder son of the 1st Earl; created Marquess of Atholl in 1676)

=== Marquesses of Atholl (1676) ===
- John Murray, 1st Marquess of Atholl (1631–1703) (elder son of the 1st Earl)
- John Murray, 2nd Marquess of Atholl (1660–1724) (eldest son of the 1st Marquess; created Duke of Atholl in 1703)

=== Dukes of Atholl (1703) ===
Other titles: Marquess of Tullibardine, Earl of Strathtay and Strathardle, Viscount of Balwhidder, Glenalmond and Glenlyonz and Lord Murray, Balvenie and Gask (Scotland, 1703); Marquess of Atholl, Earl of Tullibardine, Viscount of Balquhidder and Lord Murray, Balvany and Gask (Scotland, 1676); Earl of Atholl (Scotland, 1629); Earl of Tullibardine and Lord Murray, Gask and Balquhidder (Scotland, 1628); Lord Murray of Tullibardine (Scotland, 1604)

- John Murray, 1st Duke of Atholl (1660–1724) (eldest son of the 1st Marquess)
  - John Murray, Marquess of Tullibardine (1684–1709) (eldest son of the 1st Duke; died unmarried)
  - William Murray, Marquess of Tullibardine (1689–1746) (second son of the 1st Duke; was a Jacobite who was attainted and executed, unmarried, for treason; excluded from the succession)
  - Lord Charles Murray (1691–1720) (fourth son of the 1st Duke; predeceased his third brother without issue)
  - Lt.-Gen. Lord George Murray (1694–1760) fifth son of the 1st Duke, also attainted

Other titles (2nd and 4th through 9th Dukes): Baron Strange (England, 1628)

- James Murray, 2nd Duke of Atholl (1690–1764) (third son of the 1st Duke)
  - John Murray, Marquess of Tullibardine (1728–1729) (eldest son of the 2nd Duke; died in infancy)
  - James Murray, Marquess of Tullibardine (1735–1736) (second and youngest son of the 2nd Duke; died in infancy)
- John Murray, 3rd Duke of Atholl (1729–1774) (only son of Lord George Murray, attainted fifth son of the 1st Duke)
- John Murray, 4th Duke of Atholl (1755–1830) (eldest son of the 3rd Duke)
- John Murray, 5th Duke of Atholl (1778–1846) (eldest son of the 4th Duke; died unmarried)

Other titles (6th through 9th Dukes): Earl Strange and Baron Murray (Great Britain, 1786, extinct 1957); Baron Glenlyon (United Kingdom, 1821, extinct 1957)

- George Augustus Frederick John Murray, 6th Duke of Atholl (1814–1864) (nephew of the 5th duke; eldest son of James Murray, 1st Baron Glenlyon; see below)

Other titles (7th through 9th Dukes): Baron Percy (Great Britain, 1722)

- John James Hugh Henry Stewart-Murray, 7th Duke of Atholl (1840–1917) (only son of the 6th Duke)
  - John Stewart-Murray, Marquess of Tullibardine (1869–1869) (eldest son of the 7th Duke; died in infancy)
  - Major Lord George Stewart-Murray (1873–1914) (third son of the 7th Duke; predeceased his second brother without issue)
- John George Stewart-Murray, 8th Duke of Atholl (1871–1942) (second son of the 7th Duke; died without issue)
- James Stewart-Murray, 9th Duke of Atholl (1879–1957) (fourth and youngest son of the 7th Duke; died unmarried)
- George Iain Murray, 10th Duke of Atholl (1931–1996) (fourth cousin, twice removed of the 9th Duke; great-great-great-grandson of Rt. Rev. Dr. George Murray, eldest son of Rt. Rev. Lord George Murray, second son of the 3rd Duke; died unmarried)
- John Murray, 11th Duke of Atholl (1929–2012) (second cousin, once removed of the 10th Duke; great-great-grandson of Rt. Rev. George Murray, eldest son of Rt. Rev. Lord George Murray, second son of the 3rd Duke)
- Bruce George Ronald Murray, 12th Duke of Atholl (born 1960) (elder son of the 11th Duke)

The heir apparent is the present holder's elder son, Michael Bruce John Murray, Marquess of Tullibardine (born 1985).

=== Barons Glenlyon (1821) ===
- James Murray, 1st Baron Glenlyon (1782–1837), second son of the 4th Duke
- George Augustus Frederick John Murray, 2nd Baron Glenlyon (1814–1864) (succeeded as 6th Duke of Atholl in 1846)

see above for further succession

Line of succession (simplified)
- John Murray, 1st Marquess of Atholl (1631–1703)
  - John Murray, 1st Duke of Atholl (1660–1724)
    - James Murray, 2nd Duke of Atholl (1690–1764)
    - Lord George Murray (1694–1760)
      - John Murray, 3rd Duke of Atholl (1729–1774)
        - John Murray, 4th Duke of Atholl (1755–1830)
          - John Murray, 5th Duke of Atholl (1778–1846)
          - James Murray, 1st Baron Glenlyon (1782–1837)
            - George Murray, 6th Duke of Atholl, 2nd Baron Glenlyon (1814–1864)
              - John Stewart-Murray, 7th Duke of Atholl (1840–1917)
                - John Stewart-Murray, 8th Duke of Atholl (1871–1942)
                - James Stewart-Murray, 9th Duke of Atholl (1879–1957)
        - The Rt Rev. Lord George Murray (1761–1803)
          - The Rt. Rev. George Murray (1784–1860)
            - Rev. George Edward Murray (1818–1854)
              - Sir George Herbert Murray (1849–1936)
                - Sir George Evelyn Pemberton Murray (1880–1947)
                  - George Anthony Murray (1907–1945)
                    - (George) Iain Murray, 10th Duke of Atholl (1931–1996)
              - Rev. Douglas Stuart Murray (1853–1920)
                - George Murray (1884–1940)
                  - John Murray, 11th Duke of Atholl (1929–2012)
                    - Bruce Murray, 12th Duke of Atholl (born 1960)
                      - (1) Michael Bruce John Murray, Marquess of Tullibardine (b. 1985)
                      - (2) Lord David Nicholas George Murray (b. 1986)
                        - (3) Finley Nicholas George Murray (b. 2024)
                    - (4) Lord Craig John Murray (b. 1963)
                      - (5) Carl Murray (b. 1994)
            - Sir Herbert Murray (1829–1904)
              - Gerald Ottway Hay Murray (1868–1951)
                - Douglas Gerald Murray (1907–1980)
                  - male issue in line
                - Stewart Hay Murray (1909–1988)
                  - John Stewart Murray (1940–2000)
                    - male issue in line
                  - Peter Gerald Stewart Murray (b. 1944)
                    - male issue in line
                - Keith Robert Murray (1912–1997)
                  - male issue in line
            - Rev. Frederick William Murray (1831–1913)
              - Rev. Frederick Auriol Murray-Gourlay, 25th of Kincraig (1865–1939)
                - George Ronald Auriol Murray-Gourlay, 26th of Kincraig (1900–1961)
                  - Brian Austin Walter Murray-Gourlay, 27th of Kincraig (1927–1996)
                    - Hugh William Auriol Murray-Gourlay (1960-2025)
              - Rev. Charles Hay Murray (1869–1923)
                - Sir Francis Ralph Hay Murray (1908–1983)
                  - Ingram Bernard Hay Murray (b. 1937)
                    - Al Murray (b. 1968)
                  - male issue in line
          - Rev. Edward Murray (1798–1852)
            - Charles Edward Gostling Murray (1825–1892)
              - Rupert Murray (1882–1915)
                - Anthony Ian Rupert Murray (1914–1993)
                  - male issue in line
              - Stracey Montagu Atholl Murray (1888–1970)
                - male issue in line
                - Fane Robert Conant Murray (1929–2014)
                  - male issue in line
        - Lord Henry Murray (1767–1805)
          - Richard Murray (1787–1843)
            - Henry Murray (1815–1864)
              - Rev. Arthur Silver Murray (1858–1932)
                - Arthur Evelyn Francis Murray (1888–1972)
                  - male issue in line
                - Douglas Vivian Murray (1905–1976)
                  - male issue in line
        - Very Rev. Lord Charles Murray-Aynsley (1771–1808)
          - John Murray-Aynsley (1795–1870)
            - Hugh Percy Murray-Aynsley (1828–1917)
              - Charles Percy Murray-Aynsley (1862–1936)
                - Francis Percy Murray-Aynsley (1924–1991)
                  - male issue in line
  - Charles Murray, 1st Earl of Dunmore (1661–1710)
    - Earls of Dunmore, by special remainder to the Dukedom

== Coat of arms ==
Coat of arms of Duke of Atholl
Adopted Matriculated at the Lyon Court Coronet That of a Duke Crest Dexter, on a Wreath Argent and Azure a Mermaid holding in her dexter Hand a Mirror and in her sinister a Comb all Proper Or (for Murray); centre, on a Wreath Or and Sable a Demi-savage Proper wreathed about the temples and waist with Laurel his arms extended and holding in the right hand a Dagger, in the left a Key all Proper (for Atholl); sinister, on a Wreath Argent and Azure a Peacock's head and neck Proper accompanied on either side by two Arms from the elbows Proper and vested in Maunches Azure doubled Argent. Helm That of a Duke Escutcheon Quarterly: 1st, Paly of six Or and Sable (for Atholl); 2nd, Or a Fess chequy Azure and Argent (for Stewart); 3rd, Argent on a Bend Azure three Stags' Heads cabossed Or (for Stanley); 4th, Gules three Legs in armour Proper garnished and spurred Or flexed and conjoined in triangle at the upper part of the thigh (ensigns of the Isle of Man); over all, an Inescutcheon en surtout Azure three Mullets Argent within a Double tressure flory Or ensigned of a Marquess's coronet (for Chiefship of Murray). Supporters Dexter, a Savage Proper wreathed about the temples and loins with Juniper his feet in Fetters the Chain held in his right hand Proper; sinister, a Lion rampant Gules armed and langued Azure gorged with a plain Collar of the Last charged with three Mullets Argent. Motto (Above the crests) Dexter, Tout prest ("Quite ready"); centre, Furth fortune and fill the fetters; sinister, Praite ("Ready"). Orders Order of the Thistle circlet (displayed by the 1st, 2nd, 3rd, 4th, 6th, 7th & 8th dukes (the 8th, who died 1942, also being GCVO)

=== Heraldry ===
Murray

Stewart of Atholl

Stanley

Isle of Man

Arms of John Murray, 1st Earl of Atholl

Arms of John Murray, 1st Duke of Atholl

Arms of the 2nd to 4th Dukes of Atholl

Arms of the 7th to 9th Dukes of Atholl

== Family tree ==
Family tree of Dukes, Marquesses, and Earls of Atholl, Earls of Derby (3rd Stanley family creation), and Earls of Dunmore

John Lestrange III d. 1269
Baron Strange (1st creation), of Salop, 1295
John Lestrange IV d. 1276	Roger le Strange d. 1311; 1st Baron Strange of Salop
Baron Strange (1st creation), of Salop extinct, 1311
Baron Strange (2nd creation), of Knockyn, 1295
John Le Strange V d. 1309; 1st Baron Strange of Knockyn
Baron Mohun of Dunster, 1299
John Le Strange VI c. 1282–1311; 2nd Baron Strange of Knockyn	John de Mohun d. 1330; 1st Baron Mohun
John Le Strange c. 1297–1323; 3rd Baron Strange of Knockyn	Roger Le Strange; 1301–1349; 4th Baron Strange of Knockyn	John de Mohun d. 1322
Earl of Atholl (4th creation), 1367
Roger Le Strange c. 1327–1382; 5th Baron Strange of Knockyn	John Mohun; 1320–1376; 2nd Baron Mohun	Robert Stewart; 1316–1390; 1st Earl of Atholl, Earl of Strathearn, Later King Robert II
Earl of Atholl (6th creation), 1403	Earl of Atholl (7th creation), 1404
John Beaufort c. 1373–1410; Earl of Somerset	John Le Strange c. 1350–1397; 6th Baron Strange of Knockyn	Maud Mohun	John Stewart c. 1337–1406; 2nd Earl of Atholl, Earl of Carrick, Later King Robert III	Robert Stewart; 1340–1420; Duke of Albany, Earl of Atholl	Walter Stewart c. 1360–1437; Earl of Atholl, Earl of Strathearn, Earl of Caithness
Earldom of Atholl (4th creation) merged in the crown, 1390	Earldom of Atholl (6th creation) expired, 1406	Earldom of Atholl (7th creation) attainted, 1404
Baron Stanley, 1456	Earl of Atholl (5th creation), 1398
John Beaufort; 1401–1444; Duke of Somerset	Thomas Stanley c. 1405–1459; 1st Baron Stanley, King of Mann	Richard Le Strange; 1381–1449; 7th Baron Strange of Knockyn, 3rd Baron Mohun	James Stewart "Black Knight of Lorn"; 1399–c. 1451	Joan Beaufort c. 1404–1445	James I 1394–1437; King of Scots	David Stewart; 1378–1402; Duke of Rothesay, Earl of Atholl, Earl of Carrick
Earldom of Atholl (5th creation) extinct, 1402
Earl of Derby (3rd creation), 1485	Earl of Atholl (8th creation), c. 1457; Lord of Balveny, 1460
Margaret Beaufort; 1443–1509	Thomas Stanley; 1435–1504; 1st Earl of Derby, 2nd Baron Stanley, King of Mann	John Le Strange c. 1440–1477; 8th Baron Strange of Knockyn	John Stewart c. 1437–1442–1512; 1st Earl of Atholl
Henry VII; 1457–1509	George Stanley; 1460–1503; 9th Baron Strange of Knockyn suo uxoris	Joan Le Strange c. 1460–1514; 9th Baroness Strange of Knockyn suo jure	John Stewart c. 1480–c. 1521; 2nd Earl of Atholl
Mary Tudor; 1496–1533	Thomas Stanley; 1504–1521; 2nd Earl of Derby, 10th Baron Strange of Knockyn, 3rd Baron Stanley, King of Mann	John Stewart; 1507–1542; 3rd Earl of Atholl
Eleanor Brandon; 1519–1547	Edward Stanley c. 1509–1572; 3rd Earl of Derby, 11th Baron Strange of Knockyn, 4th Baron Stanley, Lord of Mann	John Stewart "the fair" d. 1579; 4th Earl of Atholl
Earl of Atholl (9th creation), 1596	Lord Murray of Tullibardine, 1604, Earl of Tullibardine (1st creation) and Lord Murray, Gask and Balquhidder, 1606
Margaret Clifford; 1540–1596	Henry Stanley; 1531–1593; 4th Earl of Derby, 12th Baron Strange of Knockyn, 5th Baron Stanley, Lord of Mann	John Stewart; 1566–1603; 1st Earl of Atholl, 6th Lord Innermeath	Marie Ruthven (d. after 1605)	John Stewart; 1563–1595; 5th Earl of Atholl	John Murray (c. 1550 – c. 1609); 1st Earl of Tullibardine, etc.
Earldom of Atholl (8th creation) extinct, 1595
Earl of Tullibardine (2nd creation), 1628
Ferdinando Stanley; 1559–1594; 5th Earl of Derby, 13th Baron Strange of Knockyn, 6th Baron Stanley, Lord of Mann	William Stanley; 1561–1642; 6th Earl of Derby, Lord of Mann	James Stewart d. 1625; 2nd Earl of Atholl	Dorothea Stewart	William Murray c. 1574–1627; 2nd Earl of Tullibardine, etc.	Patrick Murray; 1578–1644; 1st Earl of Tullibardine, etc.
Barony of Strange of Knockyn (9th creation) abeyant, 1594	Earldom of Atholl (9th creation) extinct, 1625	Resigned Earldom of Tullibardine and lordships in favour of his brother, 1626
Elizabeth Stanley; 1588–1633
Baron Strange (4th creation), 1628	Earl of Atholl (10th creation), 1629
Ferdinando Hastings; 1608–1655; 6th Earl of Huntingdon and Baron Hastings	James Stanley; 1607–1651; 7th Earl of Derby, 1st Baron Strange (4th creation)	John Murray c. 1610–1642; 1st Earl of Atholl	James Murray; 1617–1670; 2nd Earl of Tullibardine, etc.
Marquess of Atholl, Viscount of Balquhidder, and Lord Murray, Balveny and Gask, 1676
Charles Stanley; 1628–1672; 8th Earl of Derby, 2nd Baron Strange (4th creation)	Amelia Ann Sophia Stanley; 1633–1702/03	John Murray; 1631–1703; 1st Marquess of Atholl, etc., 2nd Earl of Atholl, 3rd Earl of Tullibardine, etc.
Earl of Tullibardine, Viscount Glenalmond and Lord Murray, 1696 (for life); Duke of Atholl, Marquess of Tullibardine, Earl of Strathtay and Strathardle, Viscount of Balwhidder, Glenalmond and Glenlyon, Lord Murray, Balveny and Gask, 1703	Earl of Dunmore, Viscount of Fincastle, Lord Murray of Blair, Moulin and Tillimet, 1686
Theophilus Hastings; 1650–1701; 7th Earl of Huntingdon and Baron Hastings	William Richard George Stanley c. 1655–1702; 9th Earl of Derby, 3rd Baron Strange (4th creation)	James Stanley; 1664–1736; 10th Earl of Derby, 6th Baron Strange (4th creation)	John Murray; 1660–1724; 1st Duke of Atholl, etc., 2nd Marquess of Atholl, etc., Earl of Tullibardine and Viscount Glenalmond and Lord Murray	Charles Murray; 1661–1710; 1st Earl of Dunmore, etc.
Theophilus Hastings; 1696–1747; 9th Earl of Huntingdon and Baron Hastings	Henrietta Stanley; 1687–1718; 4th Baroness Strange (4th creation)	William Murray; 1689–1746 styled Marquess of Tullibardine	James Murray; 1690–1764; 2nd Duke of Atholl, etc., 7th Baron Strange (4th creation)	George Murray; 1694–1760	John Murray; 1685–1752; 2nd Earl of Dunmore, etc.	William Murray; 1696–1756; 3rd Earl of Dunmore, etc.
Attainted and excluded from succession	Attainted and excluded from succession
Elizabeth Rawdon; 1731–1808; 16th Baroness Botreaux, 15th Baroness Hungerford, 13th Baroness de Moleyns, 13th Baroness Hastings	John Rawdon; 1720–1793; 1st Earl of Moira, 2nd Baron Rawdon, 4th Rawdon Baronet	Henrietta Ashburnham c. 1716–1732; 5th Baroness Strange (4th creation)	Charlotte Murray; 1731–1805; 8th Baroness Strange (4th creation)	John Murray; 1729–1774; 3rd Duke of Atholl	John Murray; 1730–1809; 4th Earl of Dunmore, etc.
Earl Strange and Baron Murray of Stanley, 1786	Baron Dunmore, 1831
Francis Rawdon-Hastings; 1754–1826; 1st Marquess of Hastings, 2nd Earl of Moira, 3rd Baron Rawdon, 5th Rawdon Baronet	Flora Mure-Campbell; 1780–1840; 6th Countess of Loudoun	John Murray; 1755–1830; 4th Duke of Atholl, etc., 1st Earl Strange, etc., 9th Baron Strange (4th creation)	George Murray; 1761–1803	George Murray; 1762–1836; 5th Earl of Dunmore, etc., 1st Baron Dunmore	Alexander Murray; 1764–1842
Baron Glenlyon
George Augustus Francis Rawdon-Hastings; 1808–1844; 2nd Marquess of Hastings; 3rd Earl of Moira; Earl of Rawdon, 4th Baron Rawdon	Barbara Rawdon-Hastings; 1810–1858; 20th Baroness Grey de Ruthyn	Charlotte Murray; 1775–1832 m. Adam Drummond of Megginch	John Murray; 1778–1846; 5th Duke of Atholl, etc., 2nd Earl Strange, etc., 10th Baron Strange (4th creation)	James Murray; 1782–1837; 1st Baron Glenlyon	George Murray; 1784–1860
Edith Maud Rawdon-Hastings; 1833–1874; 10th Countess of Loudoun	John Drummond; 1803–1889	George Augustus Frederick John Murray; 1814–1864; 6th Duke of Atholl, etc., 3rd Earl Strange, etc., 11th Baron Strange (4th creation), 2nd Baron Glenlyon	George Edward Murray; 1818–1854	Alexander Edward Murray; 1804–1845; 6th Earl of Dunmore, etc., 2nd Baron Dunmore	Virginius Murray; 1817–1861
Paulyn Francis Cuthbert Rawdon-Hastings; 1856–1907	Malcolm Drummond; 1856–1924	John James Hugh Henry Stewart-Murray; 1840–1917; 7th Duke of Atholl, etc., 4th Earl Strange, etc., 12th Baron Strange (4th creation), 3rd Baron Glenlyon	George Herbert Murray; 1849–1936	Douglas Stuart Murray; 1853–1920	Charles Adolphus Murray; 1841–1907; 7th Earl of Dunmore, etc., 3rd Baron Dunmore	Reginald Murray; 1846–1925
Baron Stanley abeyance ended, 1921	Baron Strange of Knockyn abeyance ended, 1921
Edith Abney-Hastings; 1883–1960; 12th Countess of Loudoun; Baroness Botreaux, Baroness Hastings, 7th Baroness Stanley	Elizabeth Philipps Abney-Hastings; 1884–1974; 22nd Baroness Hungerford, 20th Baroness de Moleyns, 14th Baroness Strange of Knockyn	John George Stewart-Murray; 1871–1942; 8th Duke of Atholl, etc., 5th Earl Strange, etc., 13th Baron Strange (4th creation), 4th Baron Glenlyon	James Thomas Stewart-Murray; 1879–1957; 9th Duke of Atholl, etc., 6th Earl Strange, etc., 14th Baron Strange (4th creation), 5th Baron Glenlyon	George Evelyn Pemberton Murray; 1880–1947	George Murray; 1884–1940	Alexander Edward Murray; 1871–1962; 8th Earl of Dunmore, etc., 4th Baron Dunmore	Arthur Charles Murray; 1882–1964
Earldom of Strange and Baronies of Murray and Glenlyon extinct and Barony of Strange abeyant, 1957
Baron Strange (4th creation) abeyance terminated, 1965
Jestyn Reginald Austin Plantagenet Philipps; 1917–1991; 2nd Viscount St Davids, 23rd Baron Hungerford, 21st Baron de Moleyns, 15th Baron Strange of Knockyn	John Drummond; 1900–1982; 15th Baron Strange (4th creation)	George Anthony Murray; 1907–1945	Edward David Murray; 1908–1940 styled Viscount Fincastle	Reginald Arthur Murray; 1911–1981; 10th Earl of Dunmore, etc.	Kenneth Randolph Murray; 1913–1995; 11th Earl of Dunmore, etc.
Baron Strange (4th creation) abeyant, 1982–1986
Colwyn Iestyn John Philipps; 1939–2009; 3rd Viscount St Davids, 24th Baron Hungerford, 22nd Baron de Moleyns, 16th Baron Strange of Knockyn	Jean Cherry Drummond; 1928–2008; 16th Baroness Strange (4th creation)	George Iain Murray; 1931–1996; 10th Duke of Atholl, etc.	John Murray; 1929–2012; 11th Duke of Atholl, etc.	John Alexander Murray; 1939–1980; 9th Earl of Dunmore, etc., 5th Baron Dunmore
Barony Dunmore extinct, 1980
Rhodri Colwyn Philipps b. 1966; 4th Viscount St Davids, 25th Baron Hungerford, 23rd Baron de Moleyns, 17th Baron Strange of Knockyn	Roland Augusto Jestyn Estanislao Philipps b. 1970	Adam Humphrey Drummond b. 1953; 17th Baron Strange (4th creation)	Bruce George Ronald Murray b. 1960; 12th Duke of Atholl, etc.	Malcolm Kenneth Murray b. 1946; 12th Earl of Dunmore, etc.	Geoffrey Charles Murray b. 1949
Heir presumptive to the Viscouncy St Davids, Barony Hungerford, Barony de Moleyns, and Barony of Strange of Knockyn	Heir presumptive to the Earldom of Dunmore
John Adam Humphrey Drummond b. 1992	Michael Bruce John Murray b. 1985 styled Marquess of Tullibardine	David Nicholas George Murray b. 1986
Heir apparent to the Barony of Strange (4th creation)	Heir apparent to the Dukedom of Atholl

== See also ==
- Clan Murray
- Murray (surname)
- Earl of Dunmore
- Atholl
- Atholl Highlanders
- Atolovo, a Bulgarian village named after the eighth Duke
