= John Murray, 4th Duke of Atholl =

British politician

His Grace The Duke of Atholl KT PC FRS
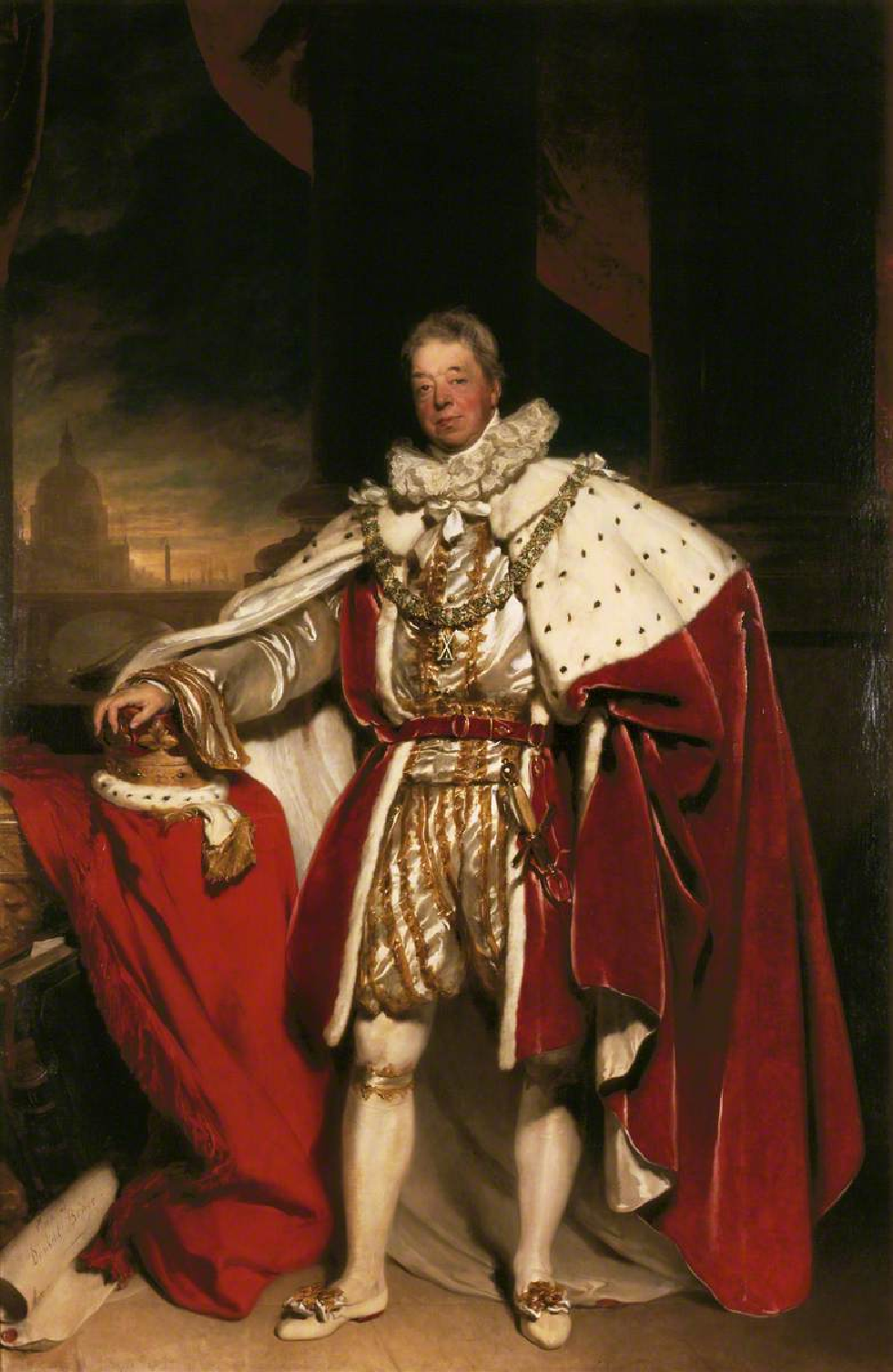
- Portrait by Thomas Lawrence

Lord Lieutenant of Perthshire
- In office 1796–1830
- Monarchs: George III; George IV; William IV
- Preceded by: New office
- Succeeded by: The Earl of Kinnoull

Personal details
- Born: 30 June 1755 Dunkeld, Perthshire, Scotland
- Died: 29 September 1830 (aged 75) Dunkeld, Perthshire, Scotland
- Spouses: Hon. Jane Cathcart (m. 1774; died 1790); Hon. Margery Forbes (m. 1794)
- Children: 11, including John, 5th Duke of Atholl, and James, 1st Baron Glenlyon
- Parents: John Murray, 3rd Duke of Atholl (father); Charlotte Murray, 8th Baroness Strange (mother)

John Murray, 4th Duke of Atholl, KT, PC, FRS (30 June 1755 – 29 September 1830), styled Marquess of Tullibardine from 1764 to 1774, was a British politician.

== Life and career ==
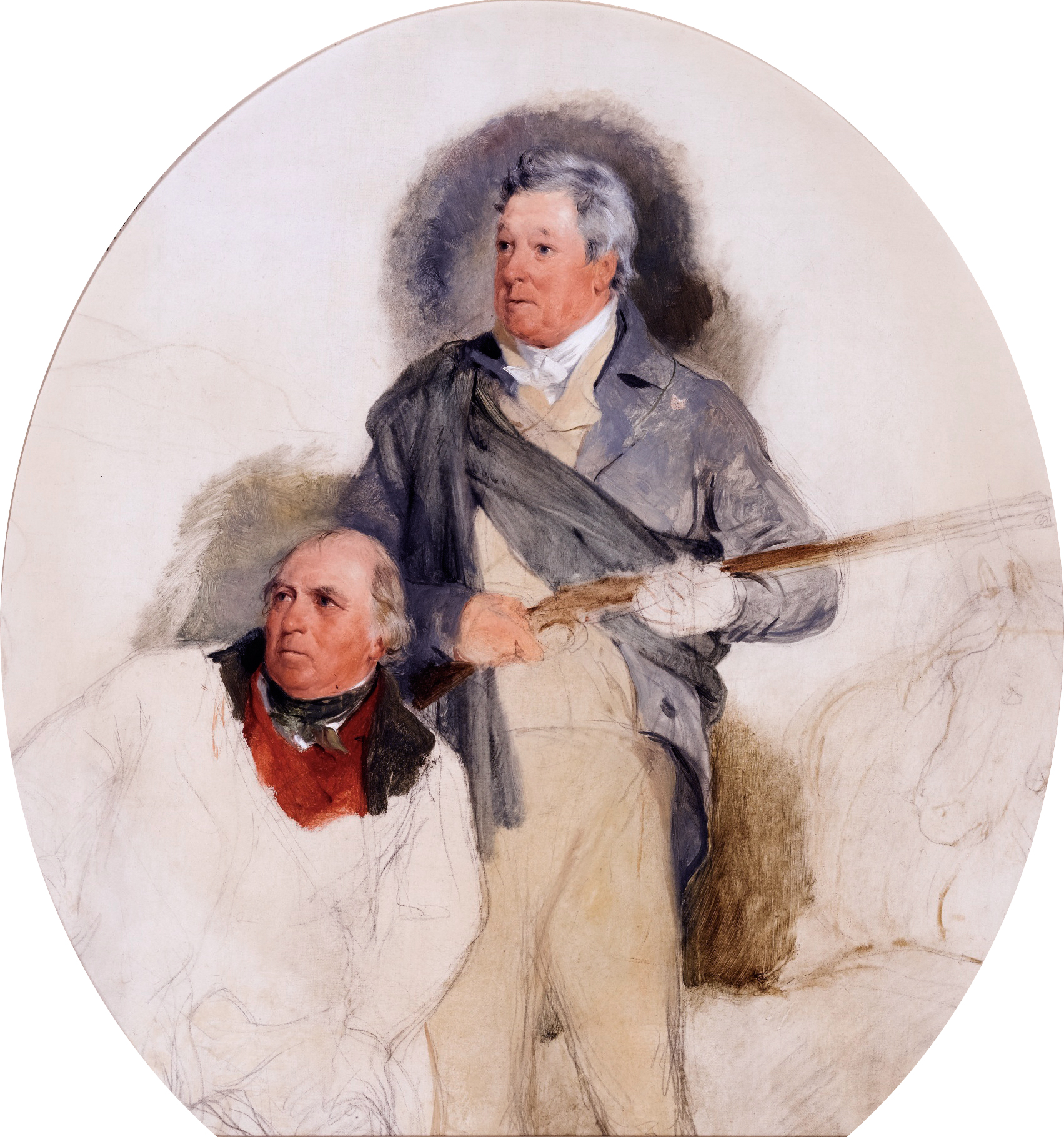
The Duke of Atholl, and his game keeper John Crerar. (Edwin Henry Landseer)

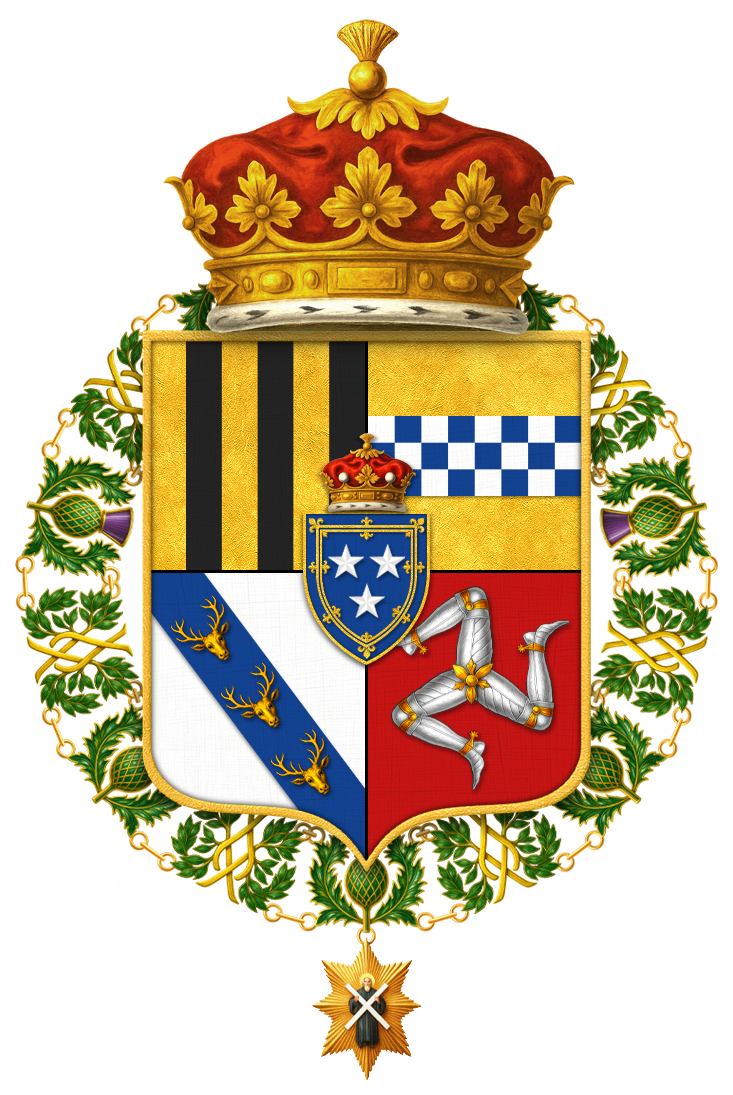
Shield of arms of John Murray, 4th Duke of Atholl, KT, PC, FRS

Murray was the eldest son of John Murray, 3rd Duke of Atholl, and his wife, Charlotte, 8th Baroness Strange, daughter of James Murray, 2nd Duke of Atholl. His parents were first cousins. Lord George Murray and Lord Charles Murray-Aynsley were his younger brothers. He became known by the courtesy title Marquess of Tullibardine when his father succeeded to the dukedom in 1764.

Murray succeeded his father as fourth Duke of Atholl in 1774 and was elected a Scottish representative peer. In 1786 he was created Baron Murray, of Stanley in the County of Gloucester, and Earl Strange in the Peerage of Great Britain, which gave him an automatic seat in the House of Lords. He later served as Lord-Lieutenant of Perthshire from 1794 to 1830 and was sworn of the Privy Council in 1797.

In 1800, he was made a Knight of the Thistle. In 1793 he was appointed Captain-General and Governor in Chief of the Isle of Man, his mother making over to him most of her rights in the Island. He succeeded his mother in the barony of Strange in 1805. He was also Grand Master of the Antient Grand Lodge of England from 1775 until 1781 and again from 1791 until 1812.

During his control of the Blair Estate, he planted over 20 million trees over an area of 16,000 acres, using cannon filled with seed to spread seed over the high hills. He earned himself the nickname "The Planting Duke".

He introduced Japanese Larch into Britain, planting the trees at Dunkeld, where they hybridized with the first European Larch in Britain, planted by his uncle, the second duke, and gave rise to the Dunkeld Larch. In 1796-97 he planted pine and larch around the Falls of Bruar as a tribute to the recently deceased Robert Burns, responding to his poem The Humble Petition of Bruar Water to the Noble Duke of Atholl (1787). The Duke wrote "Observations on Larch" in 1807 encouraging further its cultivation, which he practiced on a large scale.

Atholl's large-scale reforestation of the Blair Estate took place largely in Glen Tarf, which was set aside as grazing pasture for the people of Glen Tilt, to be held in common by the whole community. This led to the mass emigration of Glen Tilt cattle farmers; Highland historian Alexander Mackenzie attributes Atholl's reforestation efforts partially to his fondness for venison, and cites it as the first act of the Highland clearances.

The Duke was patron of the architect Goerge Steuart.

Atholl died in September 1830, aged 75, and was succeeded by his eldest son, John. The Duchess of Atholl died in October 1842, aged 81. Athol, Nova Scotia is named after him.

== Personal life ==
Atholl married his second cousin, Hon. Jane Cathcart (24 May 1754 – 26 December 1790), daughter of Charles Cathcart, 9th Lord Cathcart and Jane, Lady Cathcart (daughter of Lord Archibald Hamilton and Lady Jane Hamilton), on 26 December 1774. They had nine children:

- Lady Charlotte Murray (23 October 1775 – 31 May 1832), who married Sir John Menzies, 4th Baronet of Castle Menzies. After his death, she married Admiral Sir Adam Drummond, 7th of Megginch, a son of Colin Drummond (great-grandparents of John Drummond, 15th Baron Strange)
- Lady Mary Louisa Murray (11 December 1776 – 9 June 1777), died in infancy
- John Murray, 5th Duke of Atholl (1778–1846)
- Lady Amelia Sophia Murray (5 July 1780 – 19 June 1849), married James Drummond, 8th Viscount Strathallan
- James Murray, 1st Baron Glenlyon (1782–1837), who married Emily Frances Percy and had four children, including the 6th Duke.
- Lord Edward Murray (11 September 1783 – 19 March 1795), died in childhood
- Lord Robert Murray (13 March 1785 – 5 February 1793), died in childhood
- Lady Elizabeth Murray (19 April 1787 – 12 April 1846), married Sir Evan Murray-Macgregor
- Lord Frederick Murray (13 October 1788 – 11 April 1789), died in infancy

After his first wife's death in 1790, on 11 March 1794, he married Marjory, Lady MacLeod, the widow of John Mackenzie, Lord MacLeod and daughter of James Forbes, 16th Lord Forbes, and Catherine Innes. They had two children:

- Lady Catherine Murray (1 August 1795 – 23 January 1796), died in infancy
- Lord Charles Murray (11 March 1799 – 11 August 1824), who died of disease at Gastouni, Peloponnese while contributing to the Greek War of Independence.

== Ancestry ==
Ancestors of John Murray, 4th Duke of Atholl

8. John Murray, 1st Duke of Atholl
4. Lord George Murray
9. Lady Catherine Hamilton
2. John Murray, 3rd Duke of Atholl
10. James Murray
5. Amelia Murray
1. John Murray, 4th Duke of Atholl
12. John Murray, 1st Duke of Atholl (= 8)
6. James Murray, 2nd Duke of Atholl
13. Lady Catherine Hamilton (= 9)
3. Charlotte Murray, 8th Baroness Strange
14. Thomas Frederick
7. Jane Frederick
15. Leonora Maresco

Honorary titles
New office	Lord Lieutenant of Perthshire; 1794–1830	Succeeded by The Earl of Kinnoull
Masonic offices
Preceded by The Duke of Atholl	Grand Master of the Antient Grand Lodge of England; 1775–1781	Succeeded by The Earl of Antrim
Preceded by Sir William Forbes, Bt	Grand Master of the Grand Lodge of Scotland; 1778–1780	Succeeded by The Earl of Balcarres
Preceded by The Earl of Antrim	Grand Master of the Antient Grand Lodge of England; 1791–1812	Succeeded by The Duke of Kent and Strathearn
Peerage of Scotland
Preceded by John Murray	Duke of Atholl; 1774–1830	Succeeded by John Murray
Peerage of Great Britain
New creation	Earl Strange; 1786–1830	Succeeded by John Murray
Peerage of England
Preceded by Charlotte Murray	Baron Strange; 4th creation 1805–1830	Succeeded by John Murray
