= Crerar =

Crerar is a Scottish surname. The original name is the Scots version of the Gaelic criathar meaning Sievewright. The Crerars are a sect of Clan Macintosh, and the name originated in Perthshire.

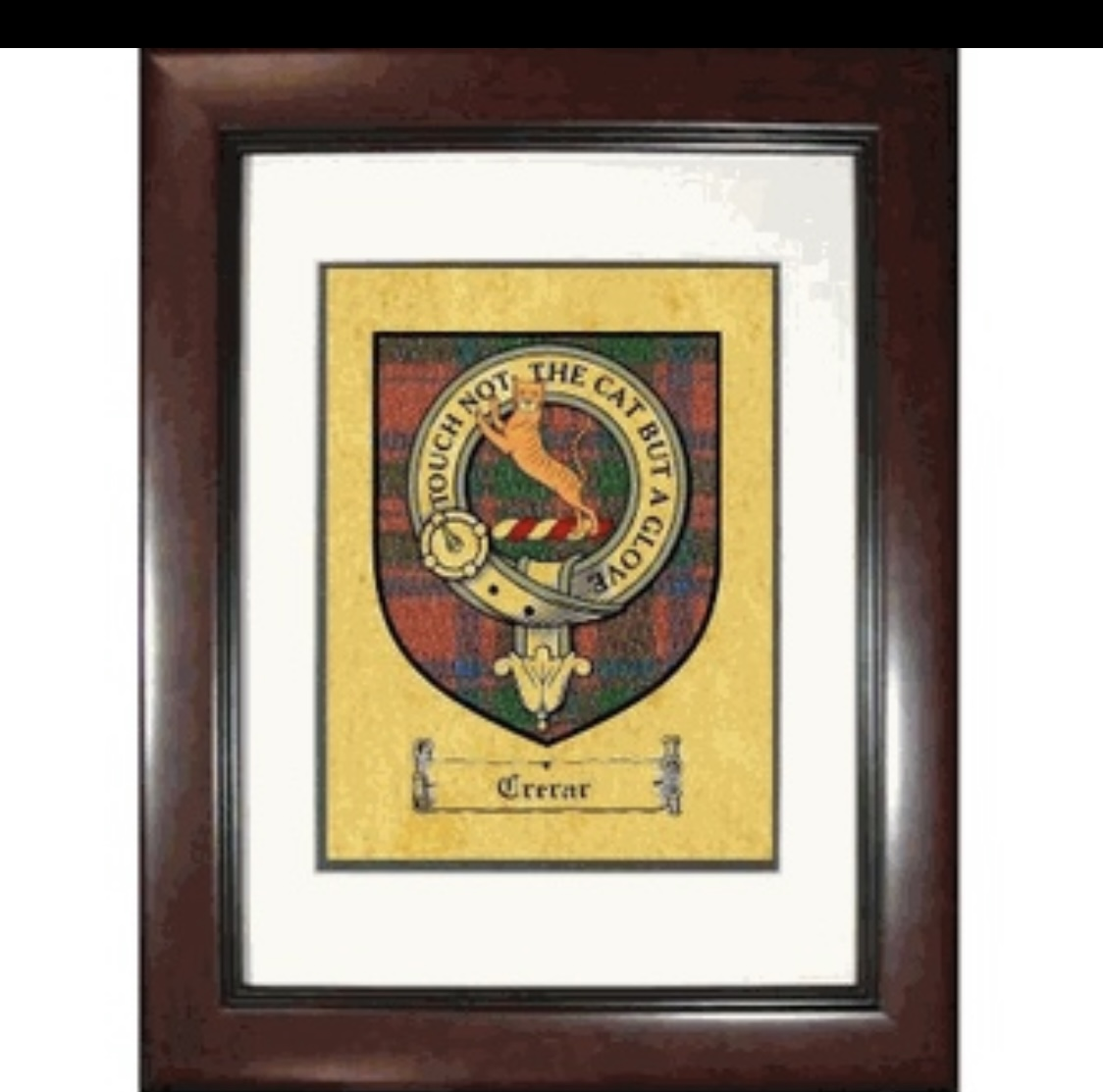
The Crerar Family Clan Crest

== People ==
- Duncan MacGregor Crerar (1836–1916), Scottish poet
- Finlay Crerar (1904–1965), RAF officer
- George Crerar (1914–1987), President of the SRU and Scottish sportsman
- Harry Crerar (1888–1965), Canadian World War II commander
- John Crerar (1750–1840), Scottish gamekeeper and composer
- John Crerar (1827–1899), American industrialist
- Leila Crerar, actress
- Peter Crerar (1785–1856), Scots-Canadian civil engineer
- Pippa Crerar (born 1976), British journalist
- Thomas Crerar (1876–1975), Canadian politician

== Places ==
- Crerar, Ontario, a neighborhood of Hamilton, Ontario named for the Canadian general Harry Crerar
- John Crerar Library, a library operated by the University of Chicago named for the American industrialist John Crerar

== Other ==
- Crerar Hotels, Scottish hotel chain
