= John Crerar =

John Crerar may refer to:

- John Crerar (industrialist), American industrialist
- John Crerar (gamekeeper), Scottish gamekeeper
- John Crerar (Canadian politician), lawyer and politician in Manitoba, Canada
