= Amelia Matilda Murray =

British botanist, writer, and courtier

- Born: 30 April 1795; Kenton
- Died: 7 June 1884 (aged 89); Castlemorton

Amelia Matilda Murray (30 April 1795 – 7 June 1884) was a British botanist, writer, and courtier. She wrote a book in defence of slavery in 1856.

== Life ==
Murray was born in Kenton to Lord George Murray and Anne Charlotte (née Grant). Her eldest brother was George Murray who became the Bishop of Rochester. She and her mother became known to George III and as a consequence her mother became a maid in waiting to the Princesses Elizabeth and Augusta. Murray herself met George III.

She came to notice when she was chosen to be a Maid of Honour to the young Queen Victoria. She was one of the eldest of the young Victoria's servants and she became known as the "Maid of Honour".

In 1854, she set out on a tour of North America and Cuba where she indulged her interest in botany as she investigated the institution of slavery. She published a book in defence of slavery that was based around letters to her friend Lady Byron. Murray had even prepared sketches to illustrate her book but these were not used. Lady Byron had been an active abolitionist and she had attended the 1840 World Anti-Slavery Convention. Murray wrote "Slavery does for the negro what European schemers in vain attempt to do for the hireling. It secures work and subsistence for all. It secures more order and subordination also." The reaction to Murray's book caused her to resign her position as woman of the bedchamber. She later published two further works.

Murray died at her home in Glenberrow, Castlemorton in 1884.

== Selected works ==
- Remarks on Education in 1847, 1847.
- Letters from the United States, Cuba, and Canada 1856.
- Recollections from 1803 to 1837, with a Conclusion in 1868 1868.
- Pictorial and Descriptive Sketches of the Odenwald 1869

== Sources ==
- Reynolds, K. D. "Murray, Amelia Matilda (1795–1884)". Oxford Dictionary of National Biography (online ed.). Oxford University Press. doi:10.1093/ref:odnb/19589. (Subscription, Wikipedia Library access or UK public library membership required.)
- Goodwin, Gordon (1892). "Murray, Amelia Matilda" . In Lee, Sidney (ed.). Dictionary of National Biography. Vol. 30. London: Smith, Elder & Co.
