= James Murray, 1st Baron Glenlyon =

British Army general

Lieutenant-General The Right Honourable The Lord Glenlyon KCH FRS
- Born: 29 May 1782; Dunkeld, Perthshire
- Died: 12 October 1837 (aged 55); St James's Street, London
- Spouse: Lady Emily Percy (m. 1810)
- Children: George Murray, 6th Duke of Atholl
- Military career
- Allegiance: United Kingdom
- Branch: British Army
- Service years: 1797–1837
- Rank: Lieutenant-General
- Units: 10th Light Dragoons; 79th Regiment of Foot
- Commands: Royal Manx Fencibles

Member of Parliament for Perthshire
- In office 1807–1812

Lieutenant-General James Murray, 1st Baron Glenlyon, KCH, FRS (29 May 1782 – 12 October 1837), styled as Lord James Murray until 1821, was a Scottish-born British Army officer, Member of Parliament and peer.

== Life ==
Murray was born in 1782 at Dunkeld, Perthshire, the second son and fifth child of John Murray, 4th Duke of Atholl and his wife, the Hon. Jane Cathcart. He was first commissioned into the British Army in 1797 and rose to the rank of Major-General by 1819. In 1807, he was elected Member of Parliament for Perthshire, holding the seat until 1812. He served as a Gentleman of the Bedchamber from 1812 to 1832 and from 1813 to 1819 was also aide-de-camp to the Prince Regent. He was created Baron Glenlyon, of Glenlyon, Perthshire, on 17 July 1821, and was promoted Lieutenant-General in 1837.

He also managed family affairs on behalf of his older brother John Murray, 5th Duke of Atholl, who had been declared insane at age 20.

According to the Legacies of British Slave-Ownership at the University College London, Glenlyon was awarded a payment as a slave trader in the aftermath of the Slavery Abolition Act 1833 with the Slave Compensation Act 1837. The British Government took out a £15 million loan (worth £1.54 billion in 2025) with interest from Nathan Mayer Rothschild and Moses Montefiore which was subsequently paid off by the British taxpayers (ending in 2015). Glenlyon was associated with "T71/892 St Vincent nos. 492A & B; 497A & B; 498A & B", he owned 610 slaves at Saint Vincent and the Grenadines and received a £15,765 payment at the time (worth £1.62 million in 2025).

Lord Glenlyon died at Fenton's Hotel, St James's Street, London, on 12 October 1837, aged fifty-five, and was buried on 30 October at Dunkeld. He died intestate.

== Marriage and issue ==
On 19 May 1810, Murray married Lady Emily Frances Percy (7 January 1789 – 21 June 1844), a daughter of General Hugh Percy, 2nd Duke of Northumberland, and his wife, Frances Julia Burrell, at St Martin-in-the-Fields, Covent Garden, London. They had six children:

- John James (27 February 1811 – 16 May 1811), died in infancy
- Unnamed son (stillborn May 1812)
- George Murray, 6th Duke of Atholl (20 September 1814 – 16 January 1864)
- Lady Charlotte Augusta Leopoldina Murray (9 April 1817 – 2 May 1889), who married Rev. Court d'Ewes Granville and had no children
- Colonel Lord James Charles Plantagenet Murray (8 December 1819 – 3 June 1874), who married Elizabeth Marjory Fairholme and had three daughters.
- Lady Frances Julia Murray (4 November 1821 – 4 November 1868), who married Colonel Hon. Charles Henry Maynard, the son of Henry Maynard, 3rd Viscount Maynard, and had no children

Glenlyon died in 1837. His father died in September 1846 and was succeeded by Glenlyon's eldest surviving son, George, as Duke of Atholl. Two months later, the new duke's surviving siblings were raised to the rank and precedency of duke's children.

== Honours ==
- Fellow of the Royal Society, 9 April 1818.
- Knight Commander of the Hanoverian Order, 1820.

Parliament of the United Kingdom
Preceded by Thomas Graham	Member of Parliament for Perthshire; 1807–1812	Succeeded by James Drummond
Peerage of the United Kingdom
New creation	Baron Glenlyon; 1821–1837	Succeeded by George Murray
