= George Murray, 6th Duke of Atholl =

Scottish noble

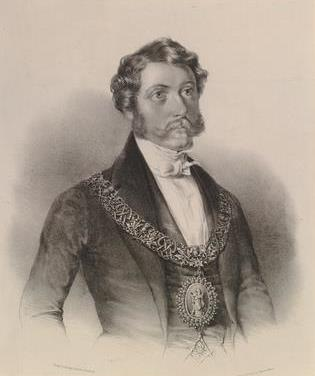
George Murray, 6th Duke of Atholl

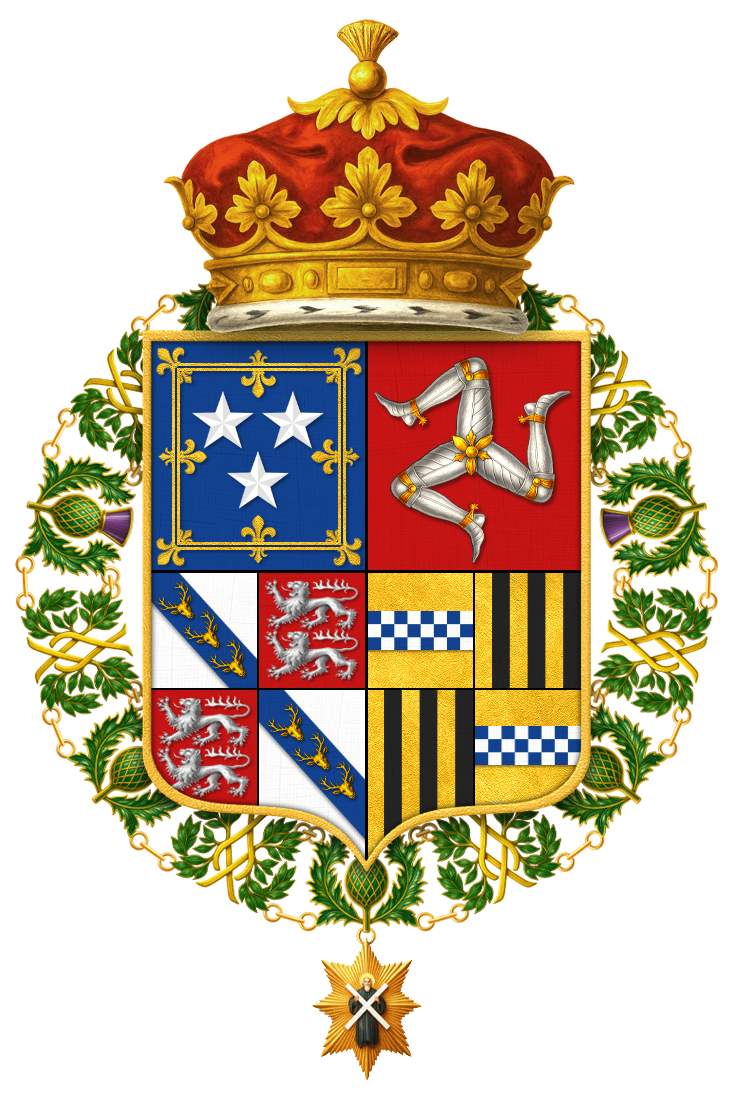
Shield of Arms of George Augustus Frederick John Murray, 6th Duke of Atholl, KT, DL

George Augustus Frederick John Murray, 6th Duke of Atholl, KT, DL (20 September 1814 – 16 January 1864) was a Scottish peer, important landowner, and freemason.

== Life ==
Born at Great Cumberland Place, Westminster, Murray was the son of James Murray, 1st Baron Glenlyon. His father was the second son of John Murray, 4th Duke of Atholl, and his wife Lady Emily Frances Percy, a daughter of Hugh Percy, 2nd Duke of Northumberland. In 1837, he succeeded his father as Lord Glenlyon, gaining a seat in the House of Lords, and also served in the British Army as a lieutenant of the 2nd Dragoon Guards, retiring in 1840. As Lord Glenlyon, he re-formed the Atholl Highlanders in 1839 as his personal bodyguard. On 30 August of that year he attended the 13th Earl of Eglinton's tournament in Ayrshire in the guise of 'The Knight of the Gael', accompanied by a retinue of his Highlanders. In 1844, when Queen Victoria stayed at Blair Castle, the Atholl Highlanders provided the guard for the Queen. So impressed was she with their turnout that she ordered they be presented with colours, giving them official status, and leading them to be Europe's only legal private army.

In 1846, Murray succeeded his uncle John Murray, 5th Duke of Atholl, to the Atholl estates and peerages. The same year, he became a Deputy Lieutenant for Perthshire and in 1853 was invested as a Knight of the Thistle.

In October 1854, shortly before the death of the Jacobite pretender Charles Edward Stuart, Count Roehenstart, Atholl welcomed him as a guest at Blair Castle.

He served as 66th Grand Master Mason of Scotland from 1843 to 1863 and was Grand Master of England from 1843 until his death in January 1864, aged 49.

== Personal life ==
On 29 October 1839, as Lord Glenlyon he married Anne Home-Drummond, daughter of Henry Home-Drummond.

Atholl died in 1864, aged 49, from cancer of the neck, and was succeeded in his peerages and estates by his only child John.

The Atholl Memorial Fountain in Dunkeld is dedicated to his memory.

== Gallery ==
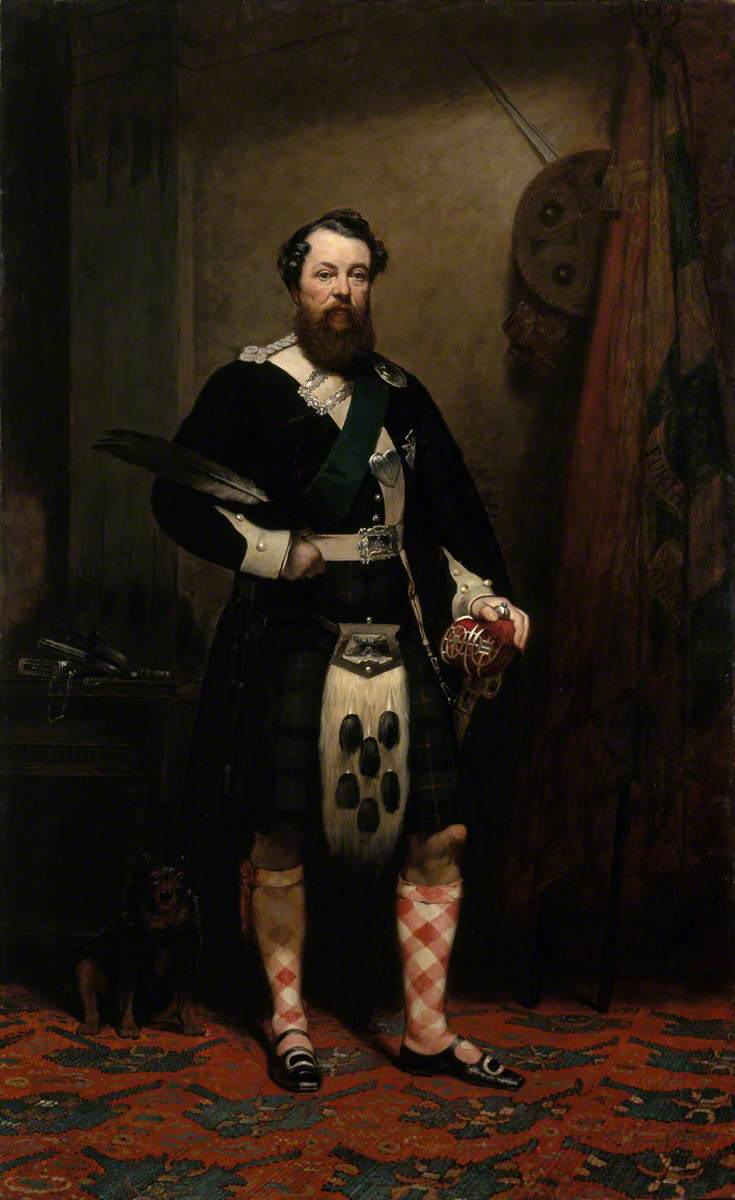
In Atholl Highlanders uniform, c. 1855–60, by John MacLaren Barclay

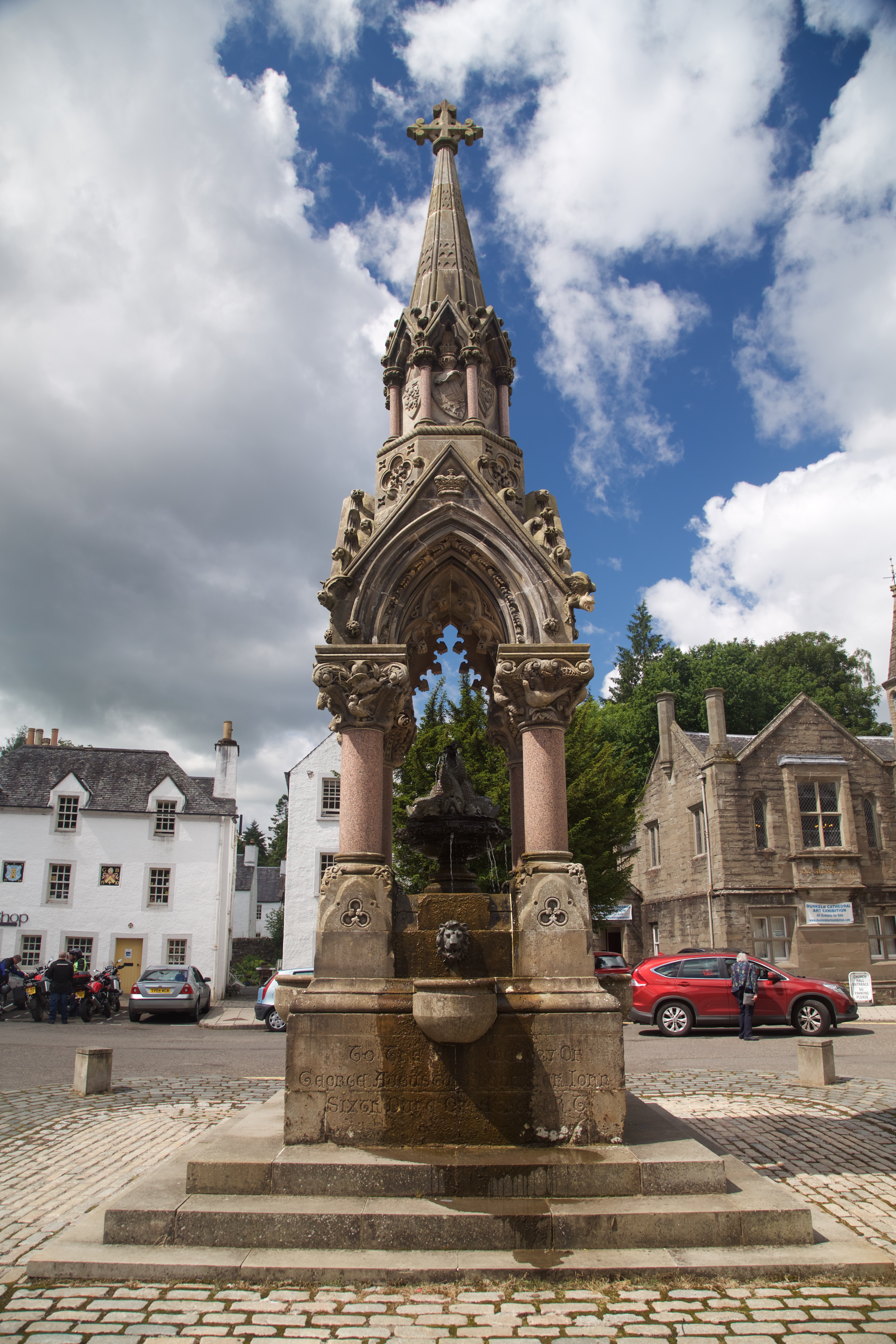
Atholl Memorial Fountain in Dunkeld

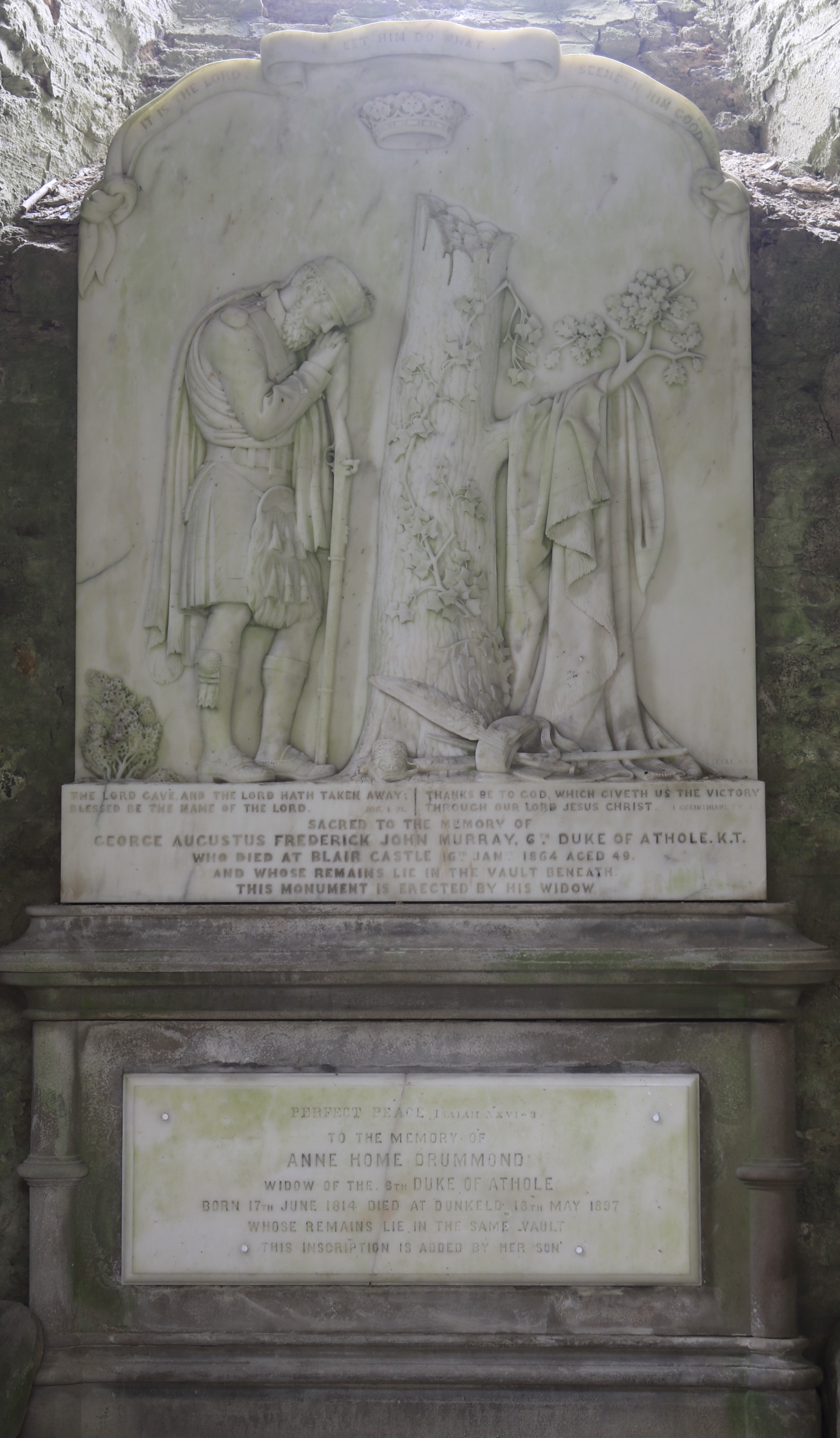
Memorial in the ruins of St Bride's Kirk in the grounds of Blair Castle

Masonic offices
Preceded by Lord Frederick FitzClarence	Grand Master of the Grand Lodge of Scotland; 1843–1864	Succeeded by John Whyte-Melville
Peerage of Scotland
Preceded by John Murray	Duke of Atholl; 1846–1864	Succeeded by John Stewart-Murray
Peerage of the United Kingdom
Preceded by James Murray	Baron Glenlyon; 1837–1864	Succeeded by John Stewart-Murray
