= John Murray, 3rd Duke of Atholl =

British politician

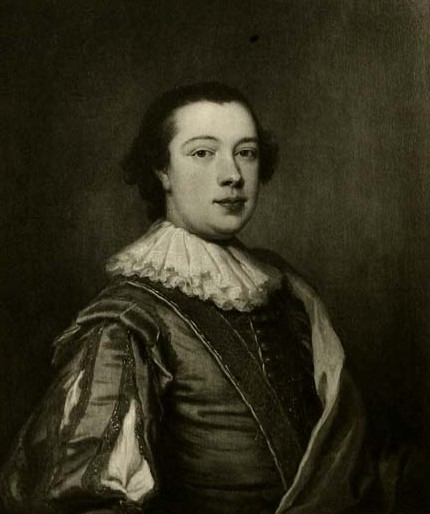
John Murray, 3rd Duke of Atholl

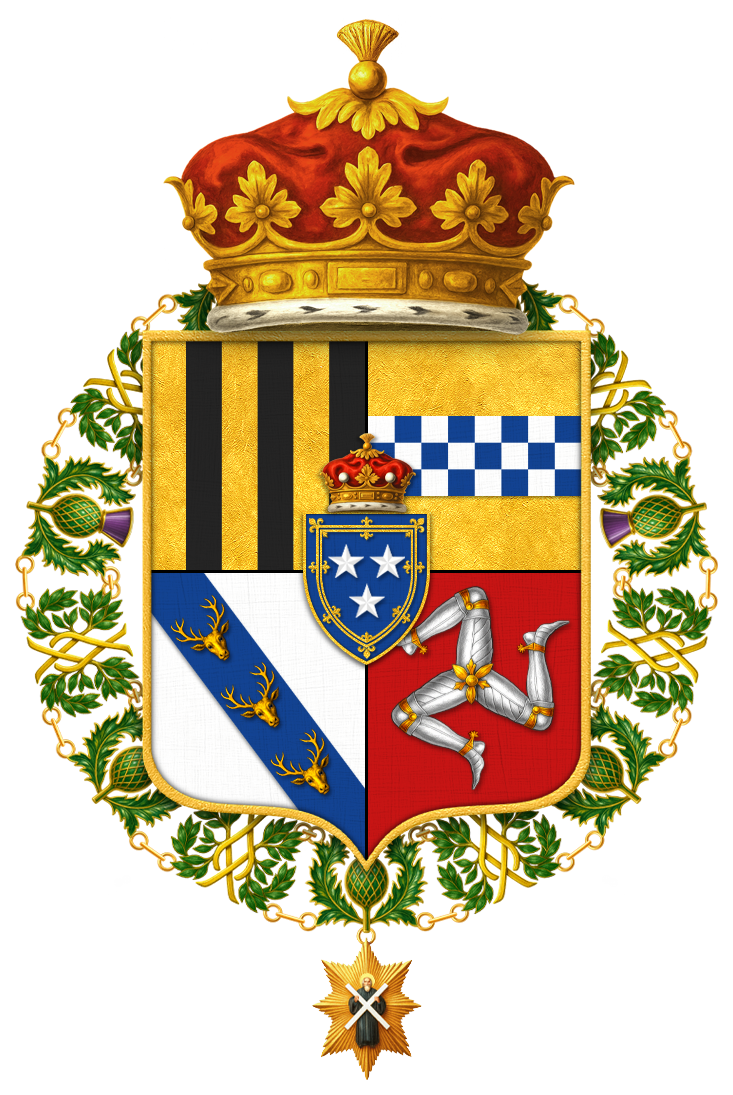
Shield of arms of John Murray, 3rd Duke of Atholl, KT, PC, encircled with the collar of the Order of the Thistle

John Murray, 3rd Duke of Atholl, KT, PC (6 May 1729 – 5 November 1774), known as John Murray until 1764, was a Scottish nobleman and Tory politician.

== Background ==
He was born 6 May 1729. Murray was the eldest son of Lord George Murray, fifth son of John Murray, 1st Duke of Atholl and Lady Catherine Hamilton. James Murray and George Murray were his younger brothers.

== Political career and patronage ==
For some time he was captain in a company of Lord Loudoun's regiment of foot, afterwards the 54th. Murray sat as Member of Parliament for Perthshire from 1761 to 1764. On 8 January 1764, his uncle and father-in-law, the 2nd Duke of Atholl, died. Murray should have been heir to the dukedom, which was only able to descend through the male line; but he was ineligible since his father had fought in the Jacobite Rising of 1745 and had consequently been attainted in the blood. However, on 7 February 1764, the House of Lords deemed Murray the rightful heir to his uncle's title (notwithstanding the attainder of his father) and he succeeded him as 3rd Duke of Atholl. He was elected a Scottish representative peer in 1766.

His wife, on the death of her father, the second duke, succeeded to the suzerainty of the Isle of Man, and to the ancient English barony of Strange, of Knockyn, Wotton, Mohun, Burnel, Basset, and Lacy. For some time negotiations had been in progress with the British government for the revestment of the suzerainty back to the British crown; and in an act of parliament, the Isle of Man Purchase Act 1765, was passed to give effect to a contract between the lords of the Treasury and the Duke and Duchess of Atholl for the purchase of the sovereignty of Mann and its dependencies for £70,000, the duke and duchess retaining their manorial rights, the patronage of the bishopric and other ecclesiastical benefices, the fisheries, minerals, etc. The arrangement rendered them very unpopular in Mann, and the 42nd Regiment of Foot, or Black Watch, under Lord John Murray, had to be stationed in the island to maintain order. The money received by the duke and duchess was directed to be laid out and invested in the purchase of lands of inheritance in Scotland, to be inalienably entailed on a certain series of heirs. The duke and duchess had also a grant of an annuity of £2,000 for their lives.

Atholl was chosen a Scottish representative peer in succession to the Earl of Sutherland, who died 21 August 1764, and he was reelected in 1768. In 1767, he was invested with the Order of the Thistle.

The 3rd Duke was patron of the fiddler Niel Gow and had a hermitage built above the Black Linn Falls on the River Brann in 1757. He was also patron of the architect Goerge Steuart. Atholl was Grand Master of the Ancient Grand Lodge of England from 1771 until 1774, and Grand Master of the Grand Lodge of Scotland from 1773 to 1774.

He died at Dunkeld on 5 November 1774.

== Family ==
Atholl married his first cousin, Lady Charlotte, daughter of James Murray, 2nd Duke of Atholl, at Dunkeld, on 23 October 1753. They had nine children:

- Lady Charlotte Murray (1754–1808)
- John Murray, 4th Duke of Atholl (1755–1830)
- The Right Reverend Lord George Murray (1761–1803)
- Lord William Murray (1762–1796); married Mary Ann Hodges, granddaughter if Sir James Hodges, Town Clerk of the City of London. They had a son, and daughter.
- Lady Amelia Murray (1763–1818); unmarried.
- Lady Jane Murray (1764–1846); married John Grosset Muirhead. No issue.
- Lord Henry Murray (1767–1805)
- Lady Mary Murray (1769–1814); married Rev. George Martin. No known issue.
- The Very Reverend Lord Charles Murray-Aynsley (1771–1808)

Atholl died in November 1774, aged 45, after drowning himself in the River Tay in a fit of delirium and was buried at Dunkeld. His eldest son John succeeded him in the dukedom.

Parliament of Great Britain
Preceded by Lord John Murray	Member of Parliament for Perthshire; 1761–1764	Succeeded by David Graeme
Head of State of the Isle of Man
Preceded by James Murray	Lord of Mann; 1764–1765	Succeeded by George III; Revested into British Crown
Masonic offices
Preceded by Hon. Thomas Mathew	Grand Master of the Antient Grand Lodge of England; 1771–1774	Succeeded by The Duke of Atholl
Preceded by The Earl of Dumfries	Grand Master of the Grand Lodge of Scotland; 1773–1774	Succeeded by David Dalrymple
Peerage of Scotland
Preceded by James Murray	Duke of Atholl; 1764–1774	Succeeded by John Murray
