= Evelyn Murray (civil servant) =

English civil servant

Sir George Evelyn Pemberton Murray, KCB (25 July 1880 – 30 March 1947) was an English civil servant. The son of civil servant Sir George Murray, he was educated at Eton College and Christ Church, Oxford, before entering the civil service in 1903 as an official in the Board of Education. In 1912, he was made a Commissioner of Customs and Excise and in 1914 became Secretary of the Post Office, serving until 1934. He was then Chairman of the Board of Customs and Excise from 1934 until 1940. His son George was killed in action in 1945 and, in 1957, George's son inherited the dukedom of Atholl from a distant relative.

Government offices
Preceded by Sir Edward Forber	Chairman of the Board of Customs and Excise; 1934–1940	Succeeded by Sir Wilfred Griffin Eady
