= William Foxlowe =

Lieutenant-General William Murray (born Foxlowe; (Note: His original surname, "Foxlowe", was also spelled as "Foxlow", as with the British Army returns.) baptised 29 October 1756 – 29 August 1818) was a British soldier.

== Early life ==
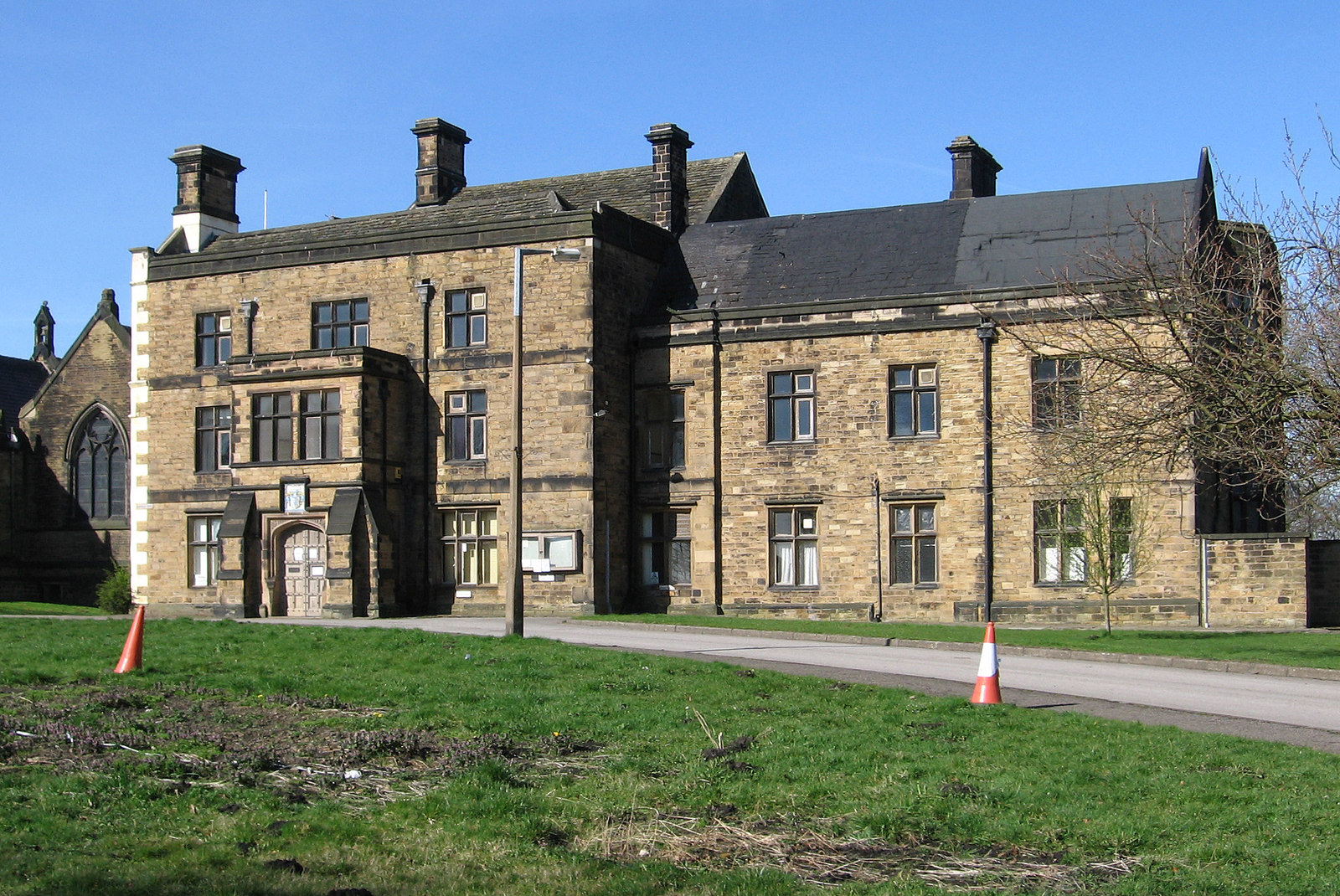
Staveley Hall, built in 1604

Foxlowe was born in 1756 and baptised at Staveley Hall, Yorkshire, on 29 October 1756. He was the second son of Samuel Foxlowe (1715–1795) of Tideswell (later of Staveley), and, his second wife, Mary Ridgeway (d. 1765).

== Career ==
Foxlowe received an appointment as ensign of the 62nd Regiment's Colonel's company on 29 March 1776. The appointment was made shortly before the regiment left Ireland so Foxlowe was unable to join the regiment, which continued until at least late February 1777 before his position in the Colonel's company was taken by another ensign, who was killed in the Battles of Saratoga in 1777. By 1779, Foxlowe received a promotion to as a Lieutenant in the 18th or Royal Irish Regiment. On 6 May 1782, he became Captain of an independent Company of Foot, which soon joined with Lord Strathaven's Corps.

== Personal life ==
On 7 February 1782, William married Mary Murray (1759–1803) at Sheffield, Yorkshire. She was the only legitimate child and heiress to the lands, fortune, and name of her father, Lord John Murray, MP for Perthshire and longtime Colonel of the 42nd (Royal Highland) Regiment of Foot (who was a son of John Murray, 1st Duke of Atholl, and was half-brother of the Jacobite leaders, William Murray, Marquess of Tullibardine, and Lord George Murray). Following their marriage, Foxlowe received a royal license to change his surname and arms to that of Murray on 30 April 1782. However, William and Mary did not have any children.

His wife died in 1803. Lieutenant-general Murray died on 29 August 1818. His estate was inherited by his sister, Anne (née Foxloew) Bagshawe, wife of Rev. William Bagshawe.
