= John Murray, 5th Duke of Atholl =

Arms of the Duke of Atholl

John Murray, 5th Duke of Atholl (26 June 1778 – 14 September 1846) was a duke in the Peerage of Scotland, a British Army officer and a major landowner in Scotland. Declared insane at the age of twenty, he never sat in the House of Lords.

He held the office of Sheriff of Perthshire from 1830 until his death. His titles included Duke, Marquess and Earl of Atholl, Marquess and Earl of Tullibardine, Earl of Strathtay and Strathardle, Viscount of Balquhidder, Glenalmond and Glenlyon, Lord Murray of Tullibardine, Lord Gask and Balquhidder, all in the peerage of Scotland; Baron Strange in the peerage of England, and Earl Strange and Baron Murray in the peerage of Great Britain.

Lord John Murray was born on 26 June 1778 at Dunkeld, Perthshire, the second son of the 4th Duke by his marriage to the Hon. Jane Cathcart, daughter of Charles Cathcart, 9th Lord Cathcart, and baptized on 17 July 1778. However, his older brother died in childhood, leaving him as heir to the family titles and estates, and from then until his father's death in 1830 he was known by the courtesy title of Marquess of Tullibardine. He was educated at Eton and in 1797 was commissioned as an ensign into the 61st Regiment of Foot. However, in 1798 he was declared of "unsound mind".

The Duke never married and died childless and insane at Greville Place, St John's Wood, London, on 14 September 1846 at the age of sixty-eight after a life of seclusion. He was succeeded by his nephew George Murray, the son of the Duke's younger brother James Murray, 1st Baron Glenlyon (1782–1837) The baron had managed the family and ducal affairs on behalf of his older brother following their father's death.

Peerage of Scotland
Preceded by John Murray	Duke of Atholl; 1830–1846	Succeeded by George Murray
