= Lady Charlotte Murray =

Scottish botanist, author and artist (1754–1808)

- Born: 2 August 1754; Dunkeld, Scotland
- Died: 4 April 1808 (aged 53); Bath, Somerset, England
- Resting place: Bath Abbey
- Occupation: Botany
- Known for: Geranium pratense
- Notable work: The British Garden

Lady Charlotte Murray (2 August 1754 – 4 April 1808) was a Scottish botanist, author and painter. She was the eldest child of John Murray, 3rd Duke of Atholl, and Charlotte Murray, Duchess of Atholl. Her paternal grandfather was the Jacobite general Lord George Murray while her maternal grandfather was the Hanoverian James Murray, 2nd Duke of Atholl.

She considered botany to be the most accessible science for people to explore and worked to encourage more people to do so. She was known to write and paint in a way that would have wide appeal.

She is best known for her two-volume work The British Garden, which ran to two or three editions in her lifetime, the second (and possibly the first) being in 1799, and the third in 1805 or 1808, and another in 1880. The book was targeted at young people and explained the Linnaean system and how it names and classifies plants. It can also be used to discover the name of an unknown plant.

In 1793, Lady Charlotte discovered a double variety of Geranium pratense which she sent to Lady Banks.

Lady Charlotte painted a collection of 267 late-eighteenth-century miniatures and organized her drawings in accordance with the Sexual System of Linnaeus in a special box. The cards display the scientific and social context of the collection, and include the way the cards may have been played in relation to a botanical card game housed in a companion box of educational games, which were also created by Lady Charlotte. She is said to have had a profound influence on the later activities of her botanist nieces Lady Charlotte Menzies and Lady Amelia Drummond.

She died in Bath, England, on 4 April 1808, having never married. She was buried in Bath Abbey.

== Selected works ==
- Murray, Charlotte (c. 1799). A Descriptive Catalogue of Hardy Plants, Indigenous Or Cultivated in the Climate of Great Britain; with Their Generic and Specific Characters, Latin and English Names, Native Country, and Time of Flowering.
- Murray, Charlotte (1808). The British Garden: A Descriptive Catalogue of Hardy Plants, Indigenous Or Cultivated in the Climate of Great Britain; with Their Generic and Specific Characters, Latin and English Names, Native Country, and Time of Flowering.... United Kingdom: Thomas Wilson.
