= Lord John Murray =

British politician (1711–1787)

General Lord John Murray
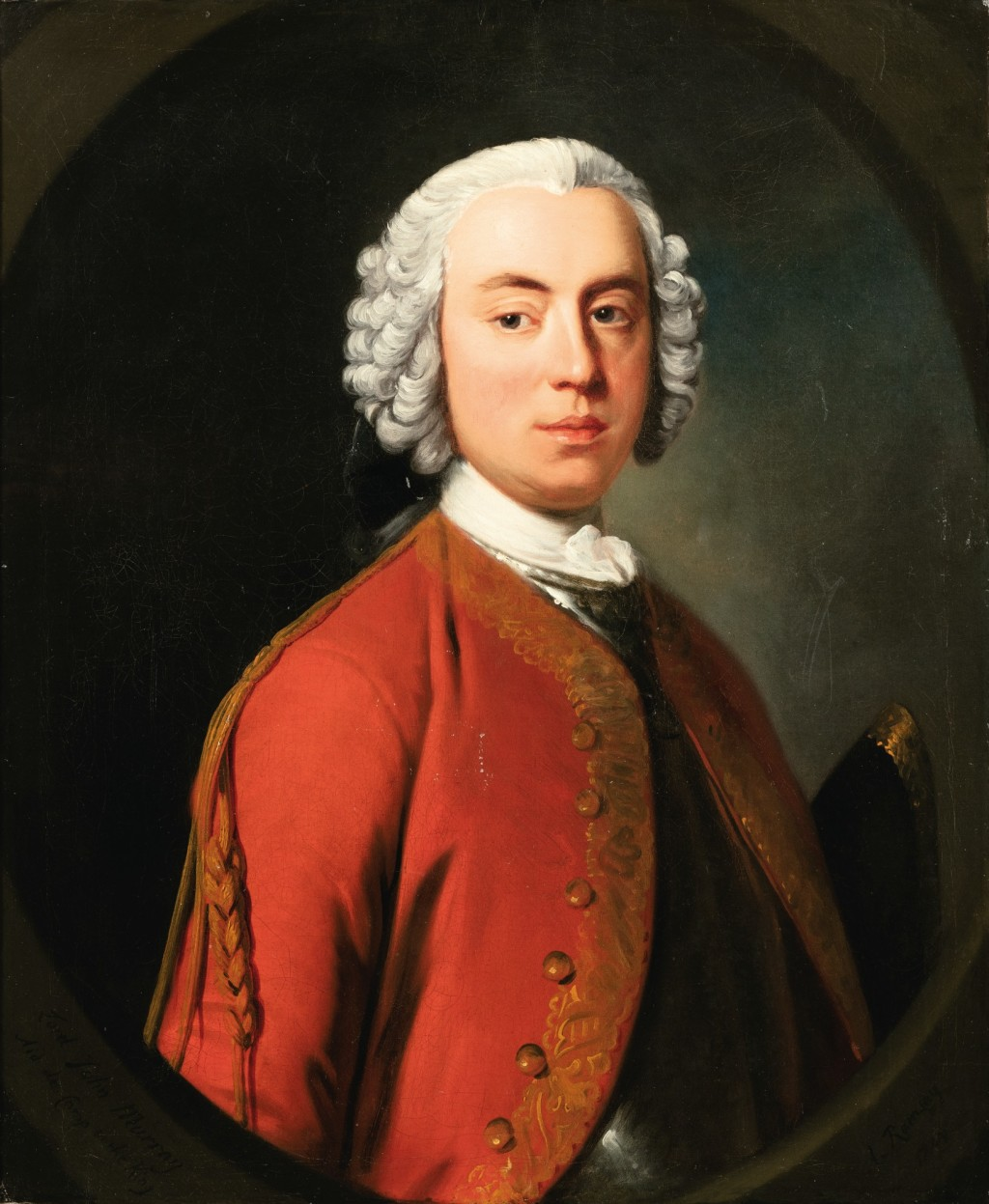
- Portrait by Allan Ramsay
- Born: 14 April 1711
- Died: 26 May 1787 (aged 76) Paris, France

General Lord John Murray (14 April 1711 – 26 May 1787) was a British general and politician.

== Life ==
He was born 14 April 1711, was eldest son by his second wife of John Murray, 1st Duke of Atholl, and was half-brother of the Jacobite leaders, William Murray, Marquess of Tullibardine, and Lord George Murray (1705–1760).

He was appointed ensign in a regiment of foot 7 Oct. 1727, on the recommendation of General Wade, and lieutenant and captain 3rd footguards (Scots guards) in 1733, in which regiment he became captain-lieutenant in 1737, and captain and lieutenant-colonel in 1738. On 25 April 1745, he was appointed to the colonelcy of the 42nd Regiment of Foot or Black Watch, which he held for forty-two years. He served with his regiment in Flanders in 1747, at the relief of Hulst and the defence of Fort Sandberg, and commanded the troops in the retreat to Walsoorden. In 1747, he was a volunteer at the defence of Bergen-op-Zoom.

He was in an especial manner the friend of every deserving officer and man in his regiment, and did more to foster the national character of the corps than any other officer. Papers of the day speak of him as marching down in full regimentals at the head of the many highlanders disabled at Ticonderoga in 1758, to plead their claims before the Chelsea board, with the result that every man received a pension. He offered every man who liked to accept it a cottage and garden on his estate rent free. Murray became a major-general in 1755, a lieutenant-general in 1758, and general in 1770. He was elected M.P. for Perth in 1741, 1747, and 1754.

He sat as Member of Parliament for Perthshire from 1734 to 1761.

He died in Paris on 26 May 1787, in his seventy-seventh year, being then the oldest general in the army.

== Family ==
He married, at Sheffield, on 13 September 1758, Miss Dalton of Banner Cross Hall, a Yorkshire lady of property. He left a daughter, Mary, who married Captain, afterwards Lieutenant-general, William Foxlowe, who took the name of Murray in 1782.

Parliament of Great Britain
| Preceded by John Drummond | Member of Parliament for Perthshire; 1734–1761 | Succeeded by John Murray |
Military offices
| Preceded by The Lord Sempill | Colonel of the 42nd (Royal Highland) Regiment of Foot; 1745–1787 | Succeeded by Sir Hector Munro |
