= John Crerar (gamekeeper) =

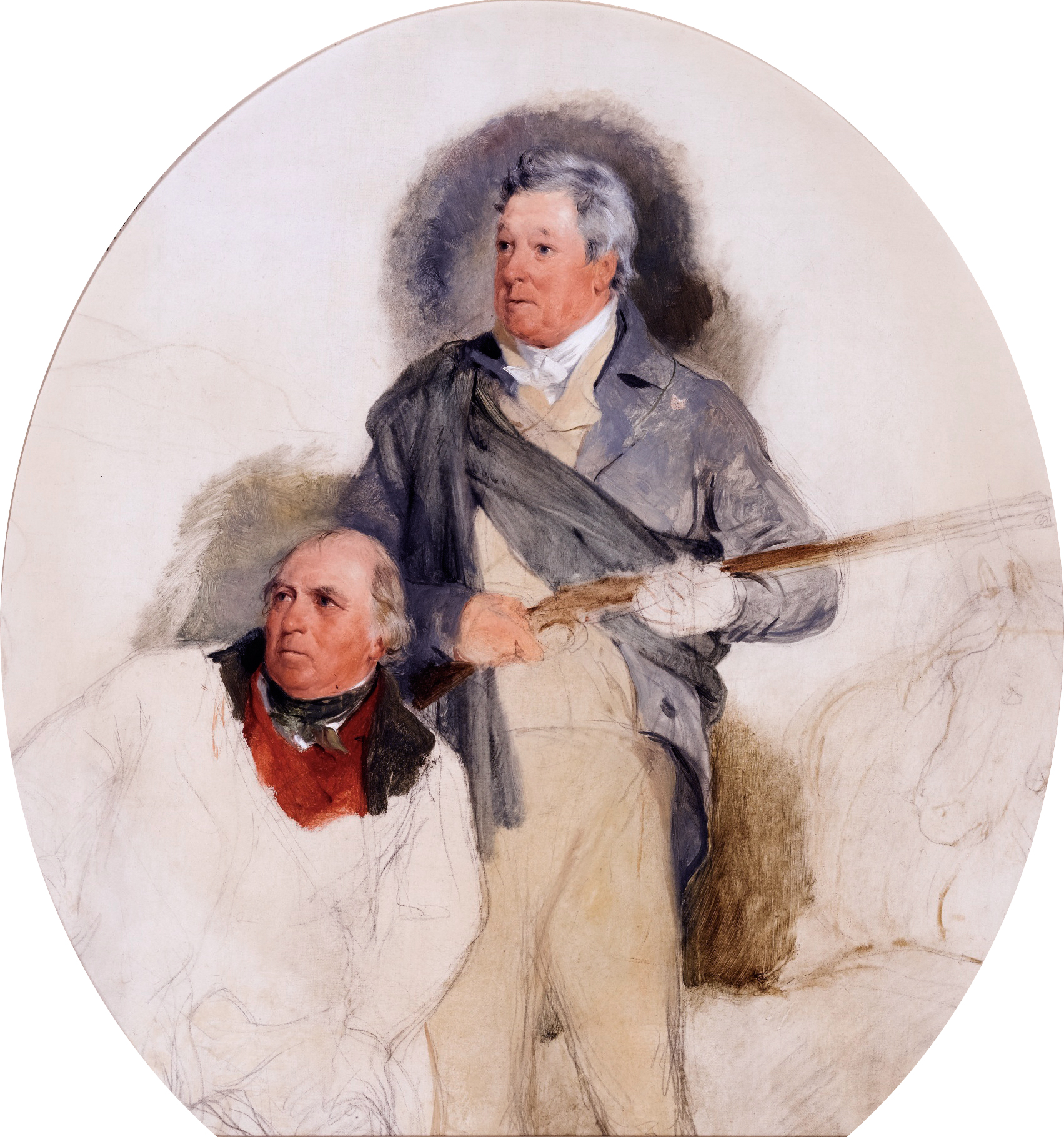
- John Murray, 4th Duke of Atholl and his game keeper John Crerar (Edwin Henry Landseer)
- Born: 29 May 1749; Perthshire
- Died: 1 March 1840 (aged 90); Dunkeld
- Occupation: Gamekeeper
- Known for: Gamekeeper to the Duke of Atholl; Composer

John Crerar was the gamekeeper to the Duke of Atholl. He entered the service of the Duke in 1776, succeeding his father, Alexander Crerar, and remained an employee for more than sixty years. He is pictured in several paintings by Edwin Landseer, including The Death of a Stag at Glen Tilt and The Keeper John Crerar with his Pony.

He was an accomplished fiddler and composer and was a contemporary and pupil of Niel Gow, and his composition The Marquis of Tullibardine is still popular today.

He is alleged to have landed a 72 lb Salmon at Ferryhaugh, north of Dunkeld, 8 lbs heavier than the official record.
