= Charlotte Murray, Duchess of Atholl =

Scottish peeress (1731–1805)

Her Grace The Duchess of Atholl Lady Strange
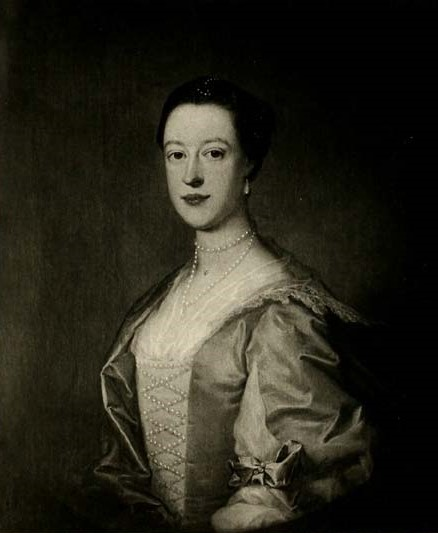
- Born: Lady Charlotte Murray; 13 October 1731; Athole, Perthshire
- Died: 13 October 1805 (aged 74); Barochey House, Glasgow, Lanarkshire, Scotland
- Burial place: Dunkeld, Perthshire
- Occupation: Peeress
- Spouse: John Murray, 3rd Duke of Atholl (m. 1753; died 1774)
- Children: Lady Charlotte Murray; John Murray, 4th Duke of Atholl; Lord James Murray; George Murray; Lord George Murray; Lord William Murray; Amelia, Lady Gamon; Lady Jane Muirhead; Lord Henry Murray; Lady Mary Martin; Lord Charles Murray-Aynsley
- Parent(s): James Murray, 2nd Duke of Atholl; Jane Frederick

Charlotte Murray, Duchess of Atholl, suo jure 8th Baroness Strange (born Lady Charlotte Murray; 13 October 1731 – 13 October 1805) was a Scottish peeress.

A plaster sculpture portrait of her, described as "After James Tassie", is held by the National Galleries of Scotland.

== Early life and background ==
Born Lady Charlotte Murray, she was the daughter of James Murray, 2nd Duke of Atholl, and his first wife, Jane Frederick (circa 1693 – 13 June 1748).

On 23 October 1753, she married her first cousin, John Murray at Dunkeld, Scotland. They had nine children.

- Lady Charlotte Murray (2 August 1754 – 4 April 1808); botanist and author.
- John Murray, 4th Duke of Atholl (30 June 1755 – 29 September 1830)
- Lord James Murray (5 December 1757 – d.); christened on 7 December 1757.
- George Murray (6 January 1759 – d.)
- Lord George Murray (30 January 1761 – 3 June 1803); christened on 1 February 1761. He was an Anglican cleric who served as Bishop of St Davids. He married Anne Charlotte Grant (1765-1844) on 18 December 1780 and had issue.
- Lord William Murray (20 March 1762 – 29 December 1796); married Mary Anne Hodges (d. 29 May 1827) on 14 June 1789 and had issue.
- Lady Amelia Murray (3 July 1763 – 1818); christened on 10 July 1763. She was married twice: firstly, to Captain Thomas Ivie Cooke; secondly, to Sir Richard Grace Gamon, 1st Baronet.
- Lady Jane Murray (2 December 1764 – 14 June 1846); married John Grosset Muirhead (d. 1836), no issue.
- Lord Henry Murray (13 June 1767 – 3 December 1805); christened on 30 June 1767. He married Eliza Kent (d. 1847) on 8 December 1786 and had issue.
- Lady Mary Murray (12 January 1769 – 1814); christened on 18 January 1769. She married Reverend George Martin (d. 1822), no issue.
- Lord Charles Murray-Aynsley (21 October 1771 – 5 May 1808); christened on 6 May 1771. He was made Dean of Bocking, in Essex. In 1793, he married Alicia Mitford (1768–1813) and had issue.

On 8 January 1764, Charlotte's father died. Her husband, John, should have been heir to the dukedom, which was only able to descend through the male line; but he was ineligible since his father had fought in the Jacobite rising of 1745 and consequently been attainted in the blood. Charlotte, however, had succeeded to her father's title of Baron Strange (which could descend through the female line) and consequently held a higher position in society than her husband. On 7 February 1764, the House of Lords deemed John as the rightful heir to his uncle's title (notwithstanding the attainder of his father) and he succeeded him as 3rd Duke of Atholl, whereupon Charlotte became Duchess of Atholl.

She inherited the sovereignty of the Isle of Man from her father on his death but sold it to the British Crown in 1765, for £70,000 and an annuity of £2,000 per year.

The duchess died on her 74th birthday in 1805, at Barochey House, near Glasgow, and was buried at Dunkeld.

Peerage of England
Preceded by James Murray	Baroness Strange; 1764–1805	Succeeded by John Murray
