= Crerar Hotels =

Scottish hotel chain

- Industry: Hotel
- Headquarters: Edinburgh, Scotland, UK
- Website: www.crerarhotels.com

Crerar Hotel Group Ltd is a hotel chain and private limited company, based in Edinburgh, Scotland. It was founded as North British Trust Hotels Ltd in December 1902 and changed its name to Crerar Hotel Group in January 2012.

== History ==
The Cheshire Public House Trust Company was founded in 1902 by the fourth Albert Grey, 4th Earl Grey.

The first trust to be set up was British Trust Hotels. Nine businessmen invested in this company and half the shareholding was settled in trust to ensure that a percentage of the profits were indeed distributed to charitable organisations.

In the early 1990s, the whole of North British's hotel bookings were from coach trip bookings, appealing to an elderly clientele.

Paddy Crerar joined North British Trust Group Ltd as a trainee and worked his way up the ranks; appointed managing director of British Trust Hotels in October 1999 and Group Managing Director (Chief Executive) of North British Trust Group in April, 2003.

Paddy acquired a shareholding in NBTG Ltd early on. This later helped him take a controlling interest in the company which became Crerar Hotels following the sale of a number of properties to Swallow Hotels in August 2005 which has been sold in 2014.

In 2005, the North British operated twenty hotels, one each at Arrochar, Ballater, Callander, Craignure, Edinburgh, Fort William, Grantown-on-Spey, Gretna Green, Harrogate, Inverness, Pitlochry, Retford, Scarborough, Strathpeffer, Thurso, Ullapool, and Wick, with two each at Inveraray, Oban, and on the Isle of Skye.

In 2005, North British Trust Group sold sixteen of its twenty hotels, retaining only those at Craignure (the "Isle of Mull"), Strathpeffer (the "Ben Wyvis"), Oban (the "Oban Bay"), and Inveraray (the "Loch Fyne"). The remainder of the business, including 1,200 employees, was sold to Swallow Hotels and Inns, a hotel chain based in Kent. North British planned to turn its attention to adventure tourism, having previously been "a favourite of elderly coach holidaymakers". At the time, some 40% of the company's custom came from coach holidays, while around 30% was from foreign travel.

In March 2022 Crerar Hotels was acquired by funds advised by Blantyre Capital Limited together with their operating partner Fairtree Hotel Investments to further expand their UK luxury leisure platform.

== Hotels ==
See below a list of Crerar Hotels:

- Golf View Hotel & Spa, Nairn, near Inverness
- Isle of Mull Hotel & Spa, Isle of Mull
- Loch Fyne Hotel & Spa, Inveraray, Argyll and Bute
- Oban Bay Hotel, Oban
- Thainstone House Hotel, Inverurie, Aberdeenshire
- Balmoral Arms, Ballater, Aberdeenshire
- The Glencoe Inn, Glencoe, West Highlands
