= Lord George Murray (bishop) =

British bishop (1761–1803)

The Right Reverend Lord George Murray
- Bishop of St David's
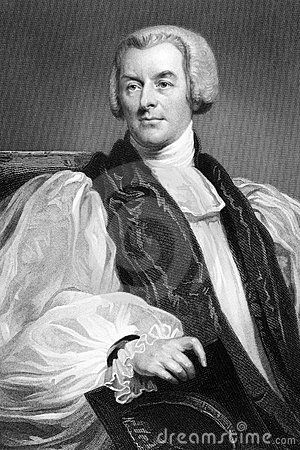
- Church: Church in Wales
- See: Diocese of St David's
- In office: 20 December 1800 –3 June 1803
- Predecessor: William Stuart
- Successor: Thomas Burgess

Orders
- Consecration: 11 February 1801

Personal details
- Born: 30 January 1761
- Died: 3 June 1803 (aged 42)
- Spouse: Anne Charlotte Grant (m. 1780)

Lord George Murray (30 January 1761 – 3 June 1803) was an Anglican cleric best remembered for his work developing Britain's first optical telegraph, which began relaying messages from London to Deal in 1796, a few years after Claude Chappe's system began operation in France. He was Bishop of Saint David's from 1801 until his death.

== Life ==
Murray was the second son of John Murray, 3rd Duke of Atholl. He was Archdeacon of Man from 1787 to 1801, a post for which his mother, Charlotte Murray, Duchess of Atholl, was the patroness.

On 19 November 1800, Murray was nominated bishop of St. David's. He was elected on 6 December, confirmed on 7 and consecrated on 11 February 1801.

He caught a chill waiting for his carriage on leaving the House of Lords, and died at Cavendish Square on 3 June 1803.

== Family ==
His father is John Murray 3rd Duke of Atholl

On 18 December 1780, he married Anne Charlotte Grant (bap. 9 August 1765 – 27 April 1844), Lady-in-Waiting to Queen Charlotte. They had nine children:

- George Murray (12 January 1784 – 16 February 1860); Bishop of Sodor and Man and Bishop of Rochester
- Charlotte Sophia Murray (1785–1866); married Rev. Townshend Selwyn (1782–1853), Canon of Gloucester.
- Caroline Leonora Murray (1788 - 8 January 1819); married Henry Fox-Strangways, 3rd Earl of Ilchester in 1812, and had two sons and two daughters.
- Louisa Ann Murray (29 May 1790 – 21 February 1871); married Sir Robert Frankland-Russell, 7th Baronet. They had five daughters.
- Amelia Matilda Murray (30 April 1795 – 7 June 1884)
- Rev. Edward Murray (5 November 1798 - 1 July 1852); married Ruperta Catherine Wright, daughter of Sir George Wright, 2nd Baronet and Rebecca MacLane. They had two sons, and two daughters.
- Henry Murray (1 February 1800 – 26 November 1830); married the Hon. Catherine Otway-Cave, daughter of Henry Otway, and Sarah Otway-Cave, 3rd Baroness Braye. They had no children.
- John Murray (d. 1803)
- Charles Murray (d. January 1808)

Church of England titles
Preceded by William Stuart	Bishop of Saint David's; 1801–1803	Succeeded by Thomas Burgess
