= Lord Charles Murray-Aynsley =

English dean

Lord Charles Murray-Aynsley (21 October 1771 – 5 May 1808) was an English dean.

== Life ==
He was the youngest of nine children of John Murray, 3rd Duke of Atholl, and Charlotte Murray, Duchess of Atholl, and baptized as Charles Murray. He matriculated in 1789 at New College, Oxford, graduating B.A. in 1792, and M.A. 1801. On his marriage in 1793 he changed his surname to Murray-Aynsley. He was ordained deacon in 1801, and priest in 1802, by Shute Barrington.

In 1803 Murray-Aynsley was made Dean of Bocking, in Essex. There he entertained King Louis XVIII of France and his suite. The Very Revd Philip Need, Dean of Bocking, described the visit as follows:

In the Year 1808 the exiled French King Louis 18th, living nearby at Gosfield Hall, was entertained by Dean Charles Murray-Aynsley at Bocking Deanery, all the parish taking part in the fun and celebrations. A job was found for everyone in the village so that they could share in the royal celebration. On the day in question it snowed heavily, so some people had the honour of clearing the snow for the King's procession.

Murray-Aynsley was also the incumbent at Kirk Andreas; and technically Archdeacon of Man.

== Family ==
On 18 June 1793 Lord Charles Murray married Alicia Mitford (1768–1813), daughter of George Mitford, and heiress of her great-uncle, Gawen Aynsley, Esq. Upon the marriage, he assumed the single surname Aynsley.

Escutcheon of Aynsley of Little Harle Tower, given by Burke in 1833 for John Murray-Aynsley (Aynsley quartering Murray)

Murray-Aynsley and his wife had seven children, three of whom did not survive to adulthood:

- Charlotte Murray-Aynsley (8 April 1794 – 22 February 1827), married Sir John Oswald in 1812
- John Murray-Aynsley (2 June 1795 – 25 March 1870), married Emma Sara Peach on 24 June 1820 and had issue, including Hugh Murray-Aynsley.
- Charles Collingwood Murray-Aynsley (1796–1797)
- George Edward Murray-Aynsley (b. 1798), died young
- Athole Keturah Murray-Aynsley (22 July 1801 – 26 January 1844), married Sir Herbert Oakeley, 3rd Baronet on 5 June 1826
- Elizabeth Anne Murray-Aynsley (30 October 1802 – 7 June 1880)
- Charles Edward Murray-Aynsley (December 1805 – August 1815)
