= Thomas Guildford =

English Member of Parliament

Thomas Guildford (by 1535–1575), of Hemsted, Kent, was an English Member of Parliament (MP).

He was a Member of the Parliament of England for Gatton in 1547. He was the son of Gatton MP, John Guildford.

Parliament of England
Preceded by Richard Shelley; John Tingleden	Member of Parliament for Gatton; 1547; With: Richard Shelley	Succeeded by Richard Southwell alias Darcy; Leonard Dannett
