= Dingleden =

Dingleden may refer to:

- Dingleden, Kent, in the parish of Benenden, England
- John Dingleden, MP
