= Henry Dudley =

Henry Dudley may refer to:

- Henry C. Dudley (1813–1894), English-born North American architect
- Henry Dudley (conspirator) (1517–1568), English conspirator
- Sir Henry Dudley, 1st Baronet (1745–1824), English minister, magistrate and playwright
- Henry Dudley (1531–1557), English soldier and brother of Queen Elizabeth I's favourite, Robert Dudley, Earl of Leicester

== See also ==
- Henry Dudley Ryder, clergyman
- Henry Dudley Ryder, 4th Earl of Harrowby, British peer
