= Slyfield =

Slyfield may refer to:

- Slyfield, Guildford
- Tim Slyfield
- Edmund Slyfield
- Sam Slyfield
- Slyfield, character in The Critic (2023 film)
