= William Wootton (politician) =

16th-century English politician

William Wotton (by 1532 – 1556) was an English Member of Parliament and lawyer.

He was the second son of Sir Edward Wotton of Boughton Place, Boughton Malherbe, Kent, and the brother of Thomas Wotton (1521–1587), sheriff of Kent. His aunt Margaret was married to Thomas Grey, 2nd Marquess of Dorset.

He was admitted to Lincoln's Inn in December 1547. He was the Member of Parliament (MP) for Maidstone in March 1553, but the right of the town to representation was challenged. In 1554 he was elected for Gatton, through the influence of his cousin Elizabeth, lady Copley.

He married Mary, daughter of Sir John Dannett of Merstham, Surrey and sister of Leonard Dannett. His wife was also a cousin of Lady Copley. No children are mentioned in his will.

Parliament of England
Preceded by Thomas Copley	Member of Parliament (MP) for Gatton; 1554	Succeeded by Thomas Copley
