= John Dudley, 2nd Earl of Warwick =

English nobleman

John Dudley
- Earl of Warwick
- Born: c. 1527 ?
- Died: 21 October 1554; Penshurst Place, Kent
- Wars and battles: Campaign against Mary Tudor, 1553
- Offices: Master of the Buckhounds; Master of the Horse
- Spouse: Anne Seymour
- Parents: John Dudley, 1st Duke of Northumberland; Jane Guildford

John Dudley, 2nd Earl of Warwick KB (1527(?) – 21 October 1554) was an English nobleman and the heir of John Dudley, 1st Duke of Northumberland, leading minister and regent under King Edward VI from 1550–1553. As his father's career progressed, John Dudley respectively assumed his father's former titles, Viscount Lisle and Earl of Warwick. Interested in the arts and sciences, he was the dedicatee of several books by eminent scholars, both during his lifetime and posthumously. His marriage to the former Protector Somerset's eldest daughter, in the presence of the King and a magnificent setting, was a gesture of reconciliation between the young couple's fathers. However, their struggle for power flared up again and ended with the Duke of Somerset's execution. In July 1553, after King Edward's death, Dudley was one of the signatories of the letters patent that attempted to set Lady Jane Grey on the throne of England, and took arms against Mary Tudor alongside his father. The short campaign did not see any military engagements, and ended with the Duke of Northumberland and his son being taken prisoner at Cambridge. John Dudley the younger was condemned to death, but subsequently reprieved. He died of natural causes shortly after his release from the Tower of London.

== Education and court life ==
John Dudley was the third of thirteen children born to Sir John Dudley and Jane Guildford, daughter of Sir Edward Guildford. When John was born, his father was a young knight, son of the executed Edmund Dudley, councillor to Henry VII; in 1537 he became vice-admiral and later Lord High Admirall. In 1542 he received his mother's title of Viscount Lisle. The elder John Dudley was a family man and happily married, as was noted by contemporaries and is evident from letters. The Dudleys moved in evangelical circles from the early 1530s, and their children were educated in Renaissance humanism and science by tutors and companions such as Roger Ascham, John Dee, and Thomas Wilson. Of the brothers, John in particular had scholarly and artistic leanings. He was the dedicatee of Walter Haddon's Cantabrigienses (1552) and Thomas Wilson's Arte of Rhetoricke (1553). As late as 1570, John Dee dedicated his Mathematicall Praeface to Euclid's Elements to the long-deceased young man's memory, praising his use of arithmetics and "hearty love to virtuous sciences". Dudley had his own small library with books in French, Italian and Latin as well as a Greek grammar, and "a tragedie in english of the unjust supremacie of the bushope of Rome".

John Dudley became his father's heir after his eldest brother Henry was killed in 1544 during the siege of Boulogne under King Henry VIII. At the coronation of Edward VI in 1547 he was made a Knight of the Bath. Some weeks into Edward's reign the new Privy Council awarded themselves a round of promotions based on Henry VIII's wishes, and the elder John Dudley was created Earl of Warwick, the younger assumed his father's old title of Viscount Lisle. The younger John Dudley and his brothers Ambrose and Robert frequently took part in tournaments and other court festivities. On 3 June 1550 he was married to Anne Seymour, eldest daughter of Edward Seymour, 1st Duke of Somerset and former Lord Protector of England. The marriage was a grand affair attended by the twelve-year-old King Edward at the palace of Sheen. According to his diary Edward had a lot of fun; he watched mock battles, masques, and there was "a fair dinner made", a great banquet. The match was to express the renewed amity between the young couple's fathers, who had been political rivals, but the peace would not last. The Earl of Warwick leading the English government since early 1550, Somerset began to plot his removal and was executed for felony in January 1552.

After King Edward, now fourteen, had raised his father to the dukedom of Northumberland in October 1551, John Dudley became styled Earl of Warwick. In April 1552 Warwick became Master of the Horse, a major position in the royal household normally held by more experienced men. In 1551 he travelled with a diplomatic mission to France. At one point he ran into financial difficulties, possibly due to bad company, as a knowing letter from his father to him reveals:

I had thought you had had more discretion than to hurt yourself through fantasies or care, specially for such things as may be remedied and holpen. ... And therefore you should not hide from me your debts whatsoever it be ... send me word in any wise of the whole sum of your debts, for I and your mother will see them forthwith paid and whatsoever you do spend in the honest service of our master and for his honour, so you do not let wild and wanton men consume it, as I have been served in my days, you must think all is spent as it should be, and all that I have must be yours ... Your loving Father. Northumberland.

In January 1553, he was summoned to Parliament by a writ of acceleration as Earl of Warwick, so that he could attend the House of Lords. This he did, but made no impact, and it is even unclear whether the other peers allowed him to take part in debates.

In February 1553, Edward VI's half-sister Lady Mary visited London and was welcomed at the outskirts by the Earl of Warwick at the head of numerous gentlemen. It was a splendid occasion, Mary being received by the Lords of the Council "as if she had been Queen of England". Still without a proper income of his own, in the next month, Warwick received the wardship of his fourteen-year-old brother-in-law, Edward Seymour.

== Downfall ==
In January 1553 the King became ill and by the beginning of June his condition was hopeless. For more than a year, the Imperial ambassador Jehan de Scheyfye had been convinced of Northumberland being engaged in some "mighty plot" to settle the Crown on his own head. Always looking out for signs as to this respect, he reported talk that the Duke was contemplating the divorce of his eldest son to marry him to Edward VI's half-sister Elizabeth. In fact, it was Warwick's youngest brother, Lord Guildford Dudley, who had recently been married. His bride was Lady Jane Grey. The potential importance of this and two simultaneous weddings escaped ambassador Jehan de Scheyfye. (Note: David Loades has described these matches as "routine actions of dynastic politics; less significant when they took place than the wedding of Lord Lisle to Anne Seymour three years before." (Loades 1996 p. 239).) Lady Jane was to ascend the English throne after the King's death, according to Edward's will, headed "My Devise for the Succession", in which he bypassed his half-sisters, Mary and Elizabeth. The Earl of Warwick was among the hundred and two personages who signed the letters patent of 21 June, which were supposed to settle the Crown on Jane. When the Duke of Northumberland took arms against Mary Tudor on 14 July, his eldest son went with him.

They passed a week that saw no action in Cambridge and Bury St Edmunds, hearing on 20 July that the Council in London had declared for Mary. Staying at Cambridge, Northumberland himself proclaimed Mary Tudor as queen at the market place. Warwick was with him as he threw up his cap and "so laughed that the tears ran down his cheeks for grief." The city that had welcomed the Duke splendidly was nervous to please the new queen. A large group of townsmen and university scholars surrounded King's College to arrest the Duke, who was with his son lodged on the premises. In contrast to his father, Warwick resisted arrest. A letter from the Council arrived that everyman could go his way, so the Duke asked to be set free, "and so continued they all night [at liberty]". At dawn the Earl of Warwick "was booted ready to have ridden in the morning", and escape. It was too late, however, as the Earl of Arundel arrived to again arrest the Duke and his entourage. The prisoners returned riding side by side through London, the guards having difficulties protecting them against the hostile populace.

After a few days, almost all the Dudley family were imprisoned in the Tower. All the men were eventually attainted and condemned to death. Warwick was tried on 18 August 1553 in Westminster Hall, alongside his father and the Marquess of Northampton. Warwick's turn was last and he, unlike the other defendants, pleaded guilty immediately. After sentence was passed Northumberland asked: "that her Majesty may be gracious to my children ... considering they went by my commandment who am their father, and not of their own free wills". His execution was planned for 21 August at eight in the morning, however, it was suddenly cancelled; Northumberland was instead escorted to St Peter ad Vincula, where he publicly took the Catholic communion, forswearing his hitherto Protestant faith, in what was a great propaganda coup for the new, Catholic, government. Any hopes of a pardon were in vain for the Duke who, after short notice, was now to be beheaded the next day. An hour before his father's execution, the Earl of Warwick was likewise led to St Peter ad Vincula to receive the sacrament; he then returned to his prison cell.

From mid-September Warwick was allowed visits by his wife. The rebellion of Thomas Wyatt in February 1554 led to the executions of Jane Grey and her husband, Guildford Dudley. Warwick, Ambrose, Robert, and Henry Dudley remained imprisoned in a room of the Beauchamp Tower. They made carvings in the walls, Warwick engraving their heraldic devices with his name "IOHN DVDLI". During his confinement, Warwick was said to be "crazed for want of air". During 1554 Jane Dudley, Warwick's mother, and his brother-in-law, Henry Sidney, were busy befriending the Spanish nobles around the new king consort, Prince Philip of Spain, in England as well as in Spain. In October, Warwick and his brothers Robert and Henry were released due to their efforts, but Warwick died immediately afterwards at Henry Sidney's home, Penshurst, in Kent.

== Notes ==
Political offices
Preceded by The Earl of Pembroke	Master of the Horse; 1552–1553	Succeeded by Sir Edward Hastings
Preceded by The Duke of Northumberland	Lord Lieutenant of Warwickshire; 1552–1553 with The Duke of Northumberland	Vacant
Court offices
Preceded by Sir Thomas Darcy	Master of the Buckhounds; 1551–1552	Succeeded by Lord Robert Dudley
Peerage of England
Preceded by John Dudley	Earl of Warwick; 2nd creation 1553	'Forfeit reversed for Ambrose Dudley
