= William Wootton =

William Wootton may refer to:

- William Wootton (politician), MP for Gatton
- Billy Wootton, footballer
