= Richard Darcy =

Richard Darcy may refer to:

- Richard Darcy, character in Anna und die Liebe
- Richard Southwell alias Darcy, MP

== See also ==
- Richard Darcey
