= Edward Guildford =

English courtier

Sir Edward Guildford
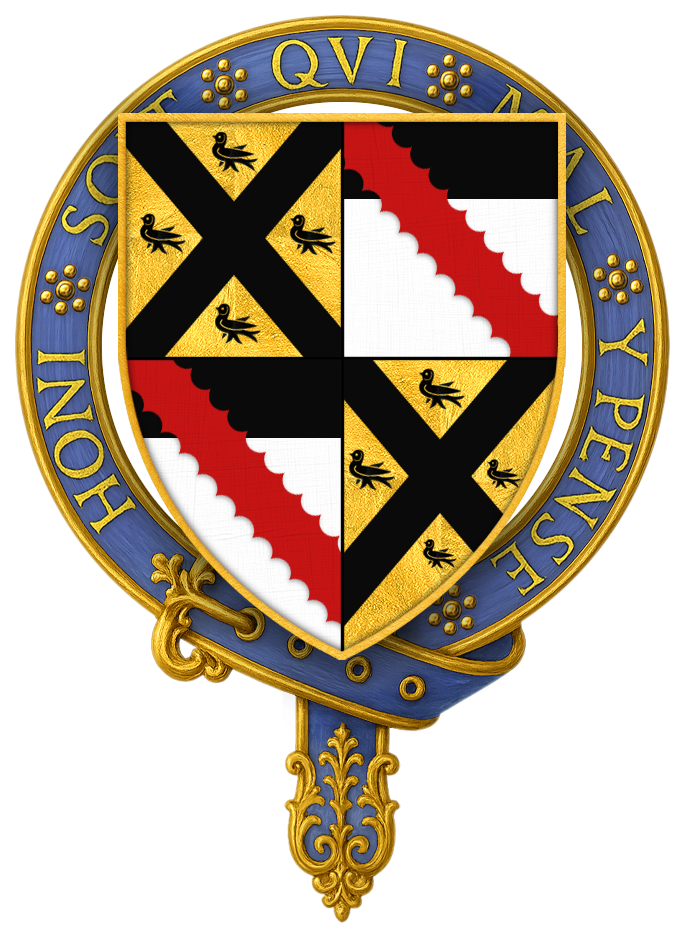
- Coat of arms of Sir Richard Guildford, KG
- Born: 1474; Offington, Broadwater, West Sussex, England
- Died: 1534 (aged 59–60)
- Occupations: Courtier, Lord Warden of the Cinque Ports, Marshal of Calais
- Spouse: 1. Eleanor West (m. before 1496, d. 11 October 1525) 2. Joan Pitlesden (m. date unknown)
- Children: Richard Guildford, Jane Dudley (married John Dudley, 1st Duke of Northumberland)
- Parent(s): Sir Richard Guildford, Anne Pympe
- Relatives: John Guildford (nephew)

Sir Edward Guildford (alternative spelling Guilford; c. 1474 – 1534) was an English courtier and Lord Warden of the Cinque Ports and Marshal of Calais in 1519. Upon his father's death in 1506, he inherited his father's position as Master of the Armoury for life. He was knighted on 25 September 1513.

== Career ==
Edward Guildford was born at Offington in the parish of Broadwater (now part of Worthing), the son of Sir Richard Guildford and Anne Pympe.

Guildford was one of the knights from Kent at the Field of the Cloth of Gold in 1520. He accompanied Henry VIII and Anne Boleyn at Calais in October 1532. His servant received a reward for bringing a gift of pheasants to the king.

Guildford married firstly, before 1496, Eleanor West, daughter of Thomas West, 8th Baron De La Warr (d. 11 October 1525), by whom he had a son, Richard, and a daughter, Jane, who married John Dudley, 1st Duke of Northumberland, with whom she had 13 children. His second wife was Joan, daughter of Stephen Pitlesden, by whom he had no issue.

His son Richard having predeceased him, Edward Guildford caused considerable strife with the family legacy when his daughter Jane inherited Haldon Manor rather than his nephew, John Guildford, Member of Parliament for Gatton, who was (arguably) instead intended to inherit with no nearer male heir.

== Notes ==
Honorary titles
Preceded by The Lord Bergavenny	Lord Warden of the Cinque Ports; 1519—1534	Succeeded by Viscount Rochford
