= Edward Edmond Slyfield =

English aristocrat

Edward Slyfield (1521 – 13 February 1590), also known as Edmond or Edmund Slyfield, was a Member of the Parliament of England for Gatton in 1571 and for Grampound in 1572.

== Biography ==
Edward Slyfield was born in 1521 at Clandon Manor, West Clandon, Surrey, England. He was the son of John Slyfield and Jane. He married Elizabeth Lambert, daughter of Walter Lambert and Margaret Gaynsford and relative of the Paulets, Sidneys and Arundells, circa 1540 at Banstead, Surrey, England; they had 11 daughters and 5 sons.

He was a leading Surrey gentleman, related to the Westons and well known to the Mores of Loseley and to Sir Thomas Cawarden. Slyfield gained a parliamentary seat at Gatton in the absence abroad of Thomas Copley, lord of the borough. No record has been found of any activity by Slyfield in either Parliament. His name appears on the first Elizabethan commission of the peace, but is omitted for unknown reasons in 1561 and 1564. In addition to his offices as justice of the peace and sheriff, he was employed in various duties, for example, in 1567 as one of three commissioners appointed by the archbishop of Canterbury. He was the High Sheriff of Sussex and Surrey between 27 November 1581 and November 1582.

Slyfield died on 13 February 1591, notably, leaving behind four Surrey manors in his will - the Manor of "Westclaverne," the Manor of West Clandon, the Manor of Papworth, and the Manor of Slyfield. Slyfield Manor was later owned by George Shiers, grandson of Sir George Shiers, benefactor of Exetor College, Oxford.
