= William Cromer (died 1598) =

English Member of Parliament

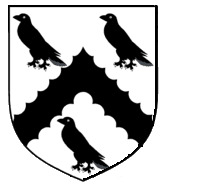
- Arms of Cromer: Argent, a chevron engrailed, between three crows, sable

Personal details
- Born: 1531 Tunstall, Kent, England
- Died: 1598 (aged 66–67) Sussex, England

William Cromer (c. 1531–1598), of Tunstall, near Sittingbourne, Kent, was an English Member of Parliament (MP). He was the great-great-grandson of the 1444 High Sheriff of Kent William Cromer. In addition to the 3x great-grandson of the former Lord Mayor of London William Cromer (d. 1434).

== Life ==
He was the son of James Cromer (died 1541) and Anne, daughter of Sir Edward Wotton. After his father died, his mother married Robert Rudston, MP for Steyning in 1547, with whom she had further children. The Cromer (or Crowner) family had held the manor of Tunstall since the early fifteenth century.

In 1554 he joined Wyatt's rebellion against Mary I of England, which led to his attainder and the forfeiture of his estate. He was released from the Tower of London and pardoned quite quickly, but the recovery of his lands was expensive and his attainder was not reversed until 1563. He was appointed a Justice of the Peace early in Elizabeth I's reign and served as sheriff of Kent in 1567. In 1573 the Queen stayed at Tunstall when traveling between Sittingbourne and Rochester. He served as sheriff for a second time in 1585.

He served as MP for Hythe in 1571, being appointed by William Brooke, 10th Baron Cobham, Lord Warden of the Cinque Ports.

== Family ==
He married:

- Margaret, daughter of Sir Thomas Kempe of Wye, Kent

Anne married Sir Thomas Bishopp, 1st Baronet

- Elizabeth, daughter of Sir John Guildford

James (d. 1613)
