= Richard Shelley =

Richard Shelley (d. in Marshalsea prison, London, probably in February or March, 1586) was an English recusant who presented to Elizabeth I of England, or her Parliament, a petition drawn up to request greater religious tolerance for Roman Catholics. The details being disputed, he was imprisoned and died.

== Life ==
The third son of John Shelley of Michelgrove, Clapham, Sussex, he was for some time abroad in attendance on his uncle Sir Richard Shelley, the last Grand Prior of England of the Order of Knights Hospitallers of St. John of Jerusalem. He was given permission to return to England in May, 1583, which he did shortly afterwards.

== The petition ==
Two accounts are extant of the petition he presented on behalf of his fellow Catholics, at that time severely limited by legislation in the practice of their religion.

One is by Peter Penkevel, who was his servant in the Marshalsea at the time of his death. This is printed by John Hungerford Pollen. Peter Penkevel says he came to London about 1584, when Robert Bellamy and others were prisoners in the Marshalsea: but Robert Bellamy was not committed there till 30 January 1586. So Penkevel must be wrong in his dates, and all that he knows about the petition, which was presented (as he says, to the queen) nearly a year previously, is mere hearsay.

John Strype on the other hand seems to have seen the petition, and according to him it was presented to Parliament. The only result was that Richard Shelley was sent to the Marshalsea, 15 March 1585. There he remained till his death, which probably took place in February or March, 1586. He was certainly alive and in the Marshalsea in October, 1585. He was sick when Peter Penkevel came to him, and "shortly after died, a constant confessor in the said prison".

== Richard Shelley of Findon ==
This Richard Shelley must be distinguished from the Richard Shelley of Findon, Sussex, and All Cannings, Wiltshire (second son of Edward Shelley of Warminghurst, Sussex, and brother of Edward Shelley the martyr), who was committed to the Marshalsea for his religion, 13 August 1580. Mass was said in his chamber there by the priest William Hartley, 24 August 1582. He was still there 8 April 1584, but was liberated soon after. He was again in prison in 1592.
