= Edward Browne (MP) =

English politician

Edward Browne (fl. 1584–1586) was an English politician.

He was a member (MP) of the parliament of England for Gatton in 1584 and 1586.
