= Thomas West, 8th Baron De La Warr =

English courtier (c.1457–1525)

Thomas West
- 8th Baron De La Warr
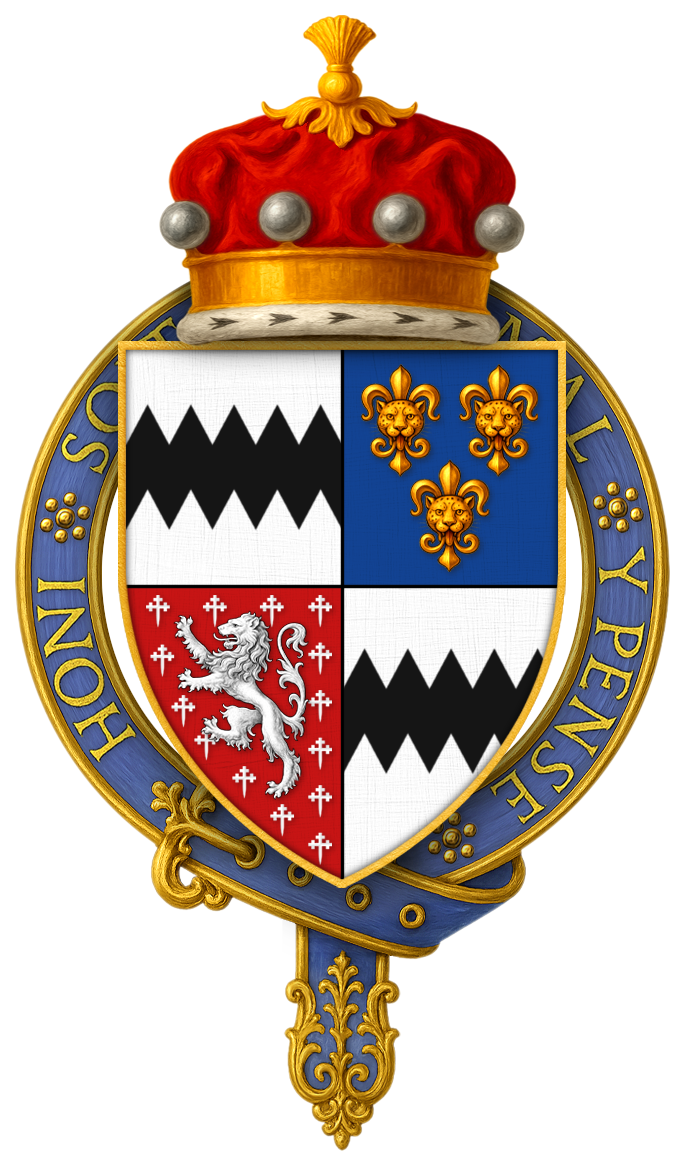
- Quartered arms of Sir Thomas West, 8th Baron De La Warr, KG: 1st & 4th: Argent, a fess dancettée sable (West); 2nd & 3rd: Gules crusilly and a lion rampant argent (La Warr)
- Born: c. 1457
- Died: 11 October 1525 (aged 67–68); Offington
- Buried: St. Mary's Church, Broadwater, Sussex
- Noble family: West
- Spouses: Eleanor Percy; Elizabeth Mortimer dau. of Hugh. Eleanor Copley
- Issue: with Elizabeth Mortimer: Thomas West, 9th Baron De La Warr; William West; Anthony West; Richard West; John West; Anne, Baroness Clinton; Eleanor, Lady Guildford; Dorothy, Lady Owen; Margaret West; Elizabeth, Countess of Worcester; Joan West with Eleanor Copley: Sir Owen West; Sir George West; Leonard West; Anne, Baroness St Amand; Mary West; Katherine West; Barbara, Lady Guildford
- Father: Richard West, 7th Baron De La Warr
- Mother: Katherine Hungerford

Arms of West: Argent, a fess dancettée sable. As borne today by Sackville (formerly Sackville-West), Earl De La Warr, Viscount Cantelupe, etc., heirs of Cantilupe

Thomas West, 8th Baron De La Warr and 5th Baron West (c. 1457 – 11 October 1525) was an English courtier and military commander during the reigns of Henry VII and Henry VIII.

== Career ==
Thomas Richard West was the eldest son of Richard West, 7th Baron De La Warr (28 October 1430 – 10 March 1476), and Katherine Hungerford (d. 12 May 1493), daughter of Robert Hungerford, 2nd Baron Hungerford of Heytesbury, Wiltshire, by Margaret Botreaux, daughter of William de Botreaux, 3rd Baron Botreaux, of Boscastle, Cornwall.

West served on an expedition to France in 1475. He was said to be aged 19 or more at his father's death on 10 March 1476, and was granted special livery of his lands on 1 September of that year.

He was knighted by Henry VII on 18 January 1478, and on 4 March 1486 was granted lands in Sussex after the attainder of the Duke of Norfolk. In 1487 he was granted an annuity of £20 by Peter Courtenay, Bishop of Winchester. In 1489 he was made a Knight of the Bath at the creation of Henry VII's eldest son, Arthur Tudor, as Prince of Wales.

He was one of the 'chief commanders' of an English force sent to Flanders in 1491 to assist the Emperor Maximilian against the French, and in 1496 was the 'chief commander' of forces raised to suppress the Cornish Rebellion, commanding a retinue at the Battle of Deptford Bridge. He was installed as a Knight of the Garter on 11 May 1510. He participated in the sieges of Therouanne and Tournai in 1513, and was made a knight banneret after the French defeat at the Battle of the Spurs on 18 August 1513. He attended Mary Tudor at her marriage to Louis XII of France in 1514, and attended Henry VIII at the Field of the Cloth of Gold in 1520. In 1524 he was appointed High Sheriff of Surrey and Sussex.

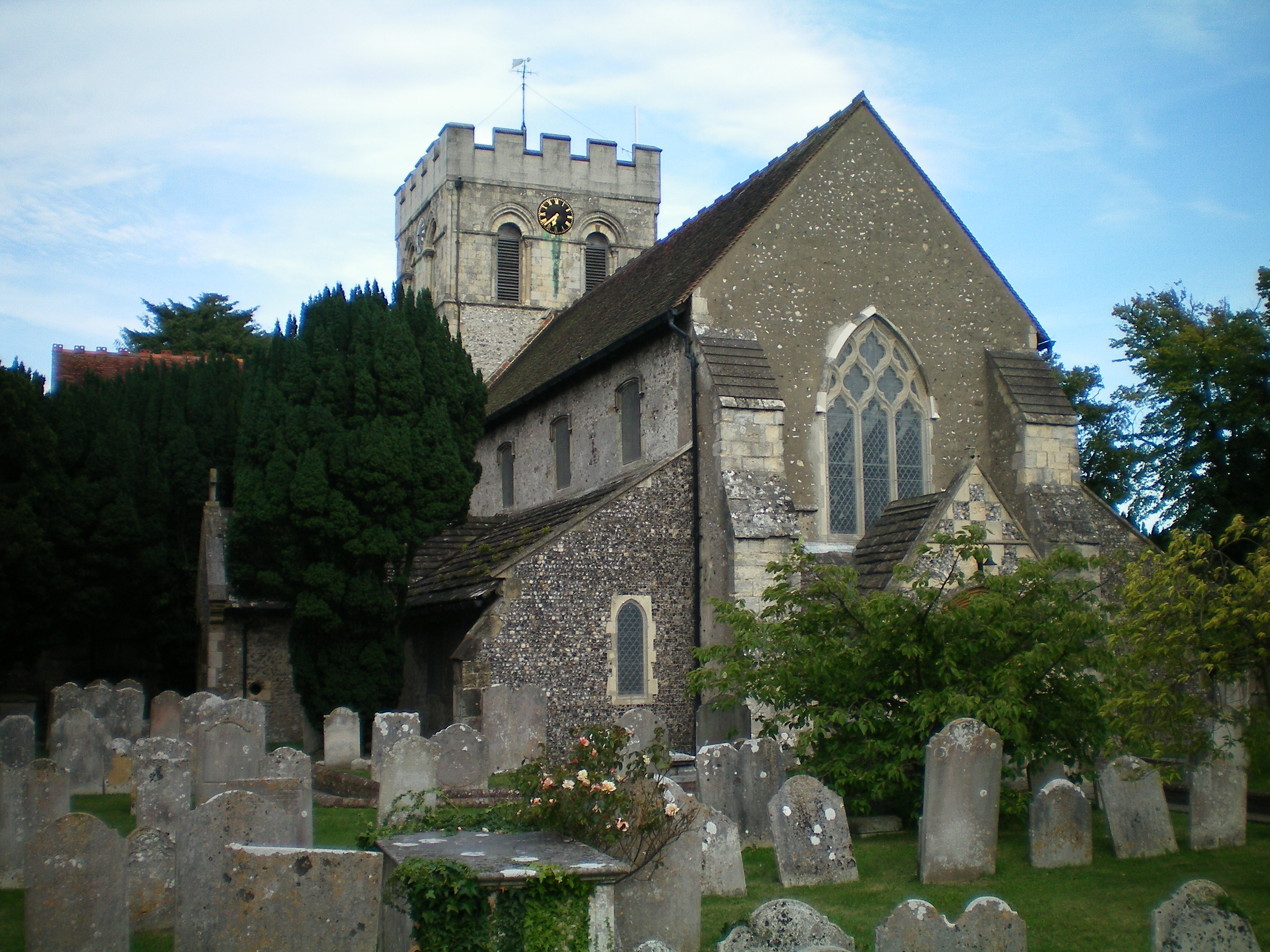
St Mary's church, Broadwater, where Thomas West, 8th Baron De La Warr, was buried

West died on 11 October 1525, and was buried at St. Mary's Church, Broadwater, Sussex. He left a will dated 8 October 1524, proved 12 February 1526. The will of his widow, Eleanor (née Copley), dated 10 May 1536, was proved on 14 November of that year. She was buried with him at Broadwater.

== Marriages and issue ==
West married first Eleanor Percy (b. 1455), daughter of Henry Percy, 3rd Earl of Northumberland, and Eleanor Poynings, daughter and heiress of Sir Richard Poynings (d. 10 June 1429), by whom he had no issue.

He married secondly, before 1482, Elizabeth Mortimer (d. 29 June 1502), the daughter of Sir Hugh Mortimer of Martley and Kyre Ward, Worcestershire, by Eleanor Cornwall, daughter of Sir Edmund Cornwall, by whom he had five sons and six daughters:

- Thomas West, 9th Baron De La Warr (d. 25 September 1554); married Elizabeth Bonville, daughter and co-heiress of John Bonville, esquire, of Shute, Devon, by Katherine Wingfield, daughter of Sir Robert Wingfield.
- William West
- Anthony West
- Richard West
- John West
- Anne West; married, as her second husband, John Clinton, 7th Baron Clinton (d. 4 June 1514).
- Eleanor West (b. 1481); married Sir Edward Guildford (d. 4 June 1534) of Halden and Hempsted in Benenden, Kent, by whom she had a son, Richard, and a daughter, Jane, who married John Dudley, 1st Duke of Northumberland.
- Dorothy West (1483–1542); married Sir Henry Owen of Pulborough and Newtimber, Sussex.
- Margaret West
- Elizabeth West (1487–1526); married, as her second husband, Charles Somerset, 1st Earl of Worcester.
- Joan West

He married, thirdly, Eleanor Copley (c. 1476–1536), daughter of Roger Copley, esquire, of London and Roughey in Horsham, Sussex, by Anne Hoo, second daughter and co-heiress of Thomas Hoo, Baron Hoo and Hastings, by whom he had three sons and four daughters:

- Sir Owen West (d. 18 July 1551); married Mary Guildford, daughter of George Guildford, esquire, second son of Sir Richard Guildford, by whom he had two daughters, coheirs to the barony of West after the death of their half-brother, Thomas West, 9th Baron De La Warr: Mary West, who married firstly Sir Adrian Poynings (d. 15 February 1571), and secondly, as his second wife, Sir Richard Rogers (died c. 1605); and Anne West.
- Sir George West (d. 1538); married Elizabeth Morton, widow of Robert Walden, and daughter of Sir Robert Morton of Croydon, esquire to Henry VIII, by whom he had two sons, William West, 1st Baron Delaware, and Sir Thomas West, and a daughter, Margaret, who married Thomas Arundel, esquire.
- Leonard West (c. 17 June 1578); married Barbara Gascoigne, daughter of Sir William Gascoigne of Gawthorpe, Yorkshire, by whom he had three sons and four daughters.
- Anne West; married Sir Anthony St Amand, an illegitimate son of Richard Beauchamp, Baron St Amand (d.1508), by whom she had a daughter, Mary, who married Richard Lewknor.
- Mary West
- Katherine West.
- Barbara West (1504–1549); married Sir John Guildford, by whom she had six sons and six daughters.

== Notes ==
Peerage of England
Preceded by Richard West	Baron De La Warr; Baron West; 1475–1525	Succeeded by Thomas West
