= Attainder of Duke of Northumberland and others Act 1553 =

Act of the Parliament of England

- Act of Parliament
- Parliament of England
- Long title: An Acte for the confirmation of thattaynder of John late Duke of Northumberlande and others.
- Citation: 1 Mar. Sess. 2. c. 16
- Territorial extent: England and Wales

Dates
- Royal assent: 5 December 1553
- Commencement: 24 October 1553 (Note: Start of session.)
- Repealed: 16 June 1977
Other legislation
| Repealed by | Statute Law (Repeals) Act 1977 |

Status: Repealed

Text of statute as originally enacted

The Attainder of Duke of Northumberland and others Act 1553 (1 Mar. Sess. 2. c. 16) was an act of the Parliament of England which confirmed the attainders for High Treason against John Duke of Northumberland, Thomas Cranmer the Archbishop of Canterbury, William Marquess of Northampton, John Earl of Warwick, Sir Ambrose Dudley, Sir Andrew Dudley, Sir John Gates, and Sir Thomas Palmer.

== Subsequent developments ==
The whole act was repealed by section 1(1) of, and part IV of schedule 1 to, the Statute Law (Repeals) Act 1977, which came into force on 16 June 1977.
