= Jane Dudley, Duchess of Northumberland =

English noblewoman and courtier

Jane Dudley
- Duchess of Northumberland
- Born: 1508/1509; Kent, England
- Died: 15 or 22 January 1555 (aged 46); Chelsea, London, England
- Buried: Chelsea Old Church
- Noble family: Dudley (by marriage)
- Spouse: John Dudley, 1st Duke of Northumberland (m. 1525; died 1553)
- Issue: Sir Henry Dudley; Thomas Dudley; John Dudley, 2nd Earl of Warwick; Ambrose Dudley, 3rd Earl of Warwick; Henry Dudley; Robert Dudley, 1st Earl of Leicester; Guildford Dudley; Mary Sidney; Charles Dudley; Katherine Hastings, Countess of Huntingdon; Temperance Dudley; Margaret Dudley; Katherine Dudley
- Father: Sir Edward Guildford
- Mother: Eleanor West

Jane Dudley, Duchess of Northumberland (née Guildford; 1508/1509 – 15 or 22 January 1555) was an English courtier. She was the wife of John Dudley, 1st Duke of Northumberland, and mother of Guildford Dudley and Robert Dudley, 1st Earl of Leicester. Having grown up with her future husband, who was her father's ward, she married at about age 16. They had 13 children.

Jane Dudley served as a lady-in-waiting at the court of Henry VIII and was a close friend of his final wife, Katherine Parr. Reformed in religious outlook, she was also a supporter of the Protestant martyr Anne Askew. Under the young Edward VI, John Dudley became one of the most powerful politicians, rising to be Earl of Warwick and later Duke of Northumberland. After the fall of Lord Protector Somerset in 1549, John Dudley joined forces with his wife to promote his rehabilitation and a reconciliation between their families, which was symbolised by a marriage between their children.

In the spring of 1553, the Duchess of Northumberland became the mother-in-law of Lady Jane Grey, whom the Duke of Northumberland unsuccessfully tried to establish on the English throne after the death of Edward VI. Mary I being victorious, the Duchess sought frantically to save her husband's life. Notwithstanding his and her son Guildford's executions, she was successful in achieving the release of the rest of her family by befriending the Spanish noblemen who came to England with Philip of Spain. She died soon afterwards, aged 46.

== Family and marriage ==
Jane Guildford was born in Kent around 1508/1509, the only daughter of Sir Edward Guildford and Eleanor West, daughter of Thomas West, 8th Baron De La Warr. Her schooling occurred at home together with her brother Richard and her future husband, who was her father's ward from 1512. In 1525, at about 16, she married Sir John Dudley, who was 20 or 21 years old. The match had been arranged by their parents some years before.

Jane Dudley gave birth to 13 children, eight boys and five girls. In most cases it is impossible to establish their birthdates exactly. An exception is Robert, the future favourite of Elizabeth I; he was born in 1532 as the fifth son, and possibly after the eldest daughter Mary, who became the mother of the courtier-poet Philip Sidney.

The family life of John and Jane Dudley seems to have been happy and was free from any scandals; around 1535 a poem praised the "love and devotion" of their marriage.

Sir Edward Guildford died in 1534 before he could draw up his last will. Since his son Richard had predeceased him, Guildford's nephew, John Guildford, claimed the inheritance. The Dudleys maintained that Guildford's daughter Jane was the natural heir. They finally won the resulting court case with the assistance of Thomas Cromwell.

== Court life ==
Jane Dudley served as a lady-in-waiting to Anne Boleyn, and later to Anne of Cleves. She was interested in the Reformed religion and, with her husband, moved in evangelical circles from the mid-1530s. In 1542 John Dudley was created Viscount Lisle. He was on friendly terms with William Parr, whose sister Katherine became Henry VIII's last queen in July 1543. As one of her closest friends, the Viscountess Lisle was among the four ladies leading her to the altar on the marriage day. Jane Dudley belonged also to the courtly sympathizers of Anne Askew, whom she contacted during her imprisonment in 1545–1546. The forthright Protestant was burnt at the stake as a heretic in July 1546 on the contrivance of the religiously conservative court party around Bishop Stephen Gardiner.

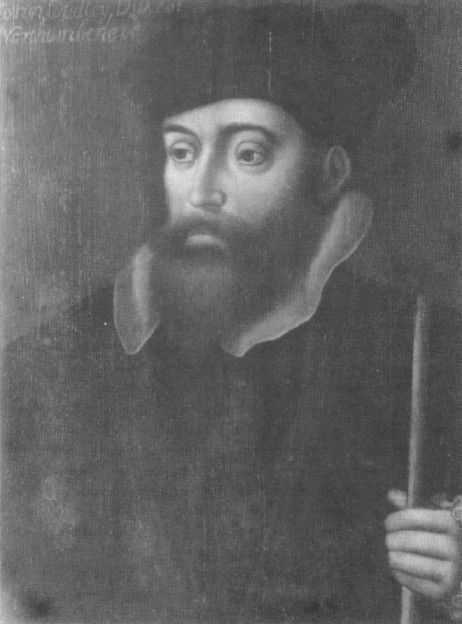
John Dudley, Jane Dudley's husband, 1540s

Renaissance humanism and science figured large in the Dudley children's education. In 1553 Jane Dudley herself commissioned two works from the mathematician and Hermeticist John Dee about heavenly configurations and the tides. Jane Dudley was close to her children; her eldest son, Henry, had died during the siege of Boulogne in 1544, aged 19. A postscript she wrote in 1552 under a letter by her husband to their then eldest son, John Dudley, 2nd Earl of Warwick, reads: "your lovynge mothere that wyshes you helthe dayli Jane Northumberland". She also had health problems: In 1548 her husband was unwilling to leave her side, because she "had had her fit again more extreme that she had any time yet."

Under Edward VI John Dudley, Viscount Lisle was raised in 1547 to the title of Earl of Warwick, while Edward Seymour, Earl of Hertford became Duke of Somerset and Lord Protector. In October 1549 the Protector lost his power in a trial of strength with the Privy Council, from which John Dudley, Earl of Warwick emerged as Lord President of the Council and leader of the government. Somerset, who had been imprisoned in the Tower of London, was soon allowed to rejoin the Council. Before his release, the Duchess of Somerset and the Countess of Warwick had arranged daily banquets to reconcile their husbands. A marriage between their respective eldest son and daughter, Anne Seymour and John Dudley, was equally promoted by the two ladies. In June 1550 a grand wedding was staged at the palace of Sheen, attended by the twelve-year-old King Edward. Jane Dudley continued as a great lady at court during the ascendancy of her husband, who became Duke of Northumberland in October 1551. She was influential with him; the financier Thomas Gresham and the diplomat Richard Morrison sought her patronage, and she also interceded for Mary Tudor, who had stood godmother to one of her daughters in 1545.

== Mother-in-law to a queen ==
King Edward fell ill in early 1553. He drew up a document, "My Devise for the Succession", whose final version of June 1553 was to settle the Crown on his Protestant cousin Lady Jane Grey, overturning the claims of his half-sisters Mary and Elizabeth. Jane Grey was the daughter of Frances Grey, Duchess of Suffolk, a niece of Henry VIII by his younger sister Mary. On 25 May 1553 three matrimonial alliances were celebrated at Durham Place, the Dudleys' London town mansion. Two of their younger children were concerned: Guildford, aged about 17, married Lady Jane Grey, while Katherine, who was between eight and ten years old, was promised to the Earl of Huntingdon's heir, Henry Hastings. A few months later these matches came to be seen as proof of a conspiracy by the Duke of Northumberland to bring his family to the throne. At the time the marriages took place, however, their dynastical implications were not considered significant by even the most suspicious of observers, the Imperial ambassador Jehan de Scheyfye. Modern historians have considered them either as part of a plot, or as "routine actions of dynastic politics", in the words of David Loades. The initiative for the matches had probably come from the Marchioness of Northampton.

After Edward's death on 6 July 1553 Northumberland undertook the enforcement of the King's will. Lady Jane Grey accepted the Crown only after remonstrances by her parents and parents-in-law. On 10 July the Duchess of Northumberland accompanied her son and daughter-in-law on their ceremonial entry into the Tower of London, where they were to reside for the rest of the short reign. According to Jane's own exculpatory letter to Queen Mary a few months later, Guildford now wanted to be made king. The young people agreed on having him declared king by Act of Parliament; but then Jane changed her mind and declared she would only make him a duke. "I will not be a duke, I will be King", Guildford replied and went to fetch his mother. Furious, the Duchess took the side of her son, before she told him to leave the Tower and go home. Jane, however, insisted that he remain at court. According to her the Duchess also "induced her son not to sleep with me any more", and it is clear from her writings that Jane disliked her mother-in-law.

== Downfall and struggle for her family ==
To claim her right, Mary Tudor began assembling her supporters in East Anglia and demanded to be recognised as queen by the Privy Council in London. When her letter arrived on 10 July 1553 during dinner, the Duchess of Suffolk, Jane's mother, and the Duchess of Northumberland broke into tears. Mary was gathering strength, and, on 14 July, the Duke marched to Cambridge with troops to capture her. As it came, he passed a tranquil week until he heard on 20 July that the Council in London had declared for Mary. On the orders of the Privy Council Northumberland himself now proclaimed Queen Mary at the market-place and awaited his arrest. His wife was still in the Tower, but was soon released. She tried to intercede personally for her imprisoned husband and five sons with Mary, who was staying outside London. However, 5 mi (8.0 km) before reaching the court, the Duchess was turned away on the Queen's orders, unlike Frances Brandon, the Queen's cousin and mother of Lady Jane. She then wrote a letter to her friend Lady Paget, the wife of William, Lord Paget, asking her to plead with the Queen's ladies for her husband's life. Her plea, if not unheard, went unanswered, and the Duke of Northumberland was executed on 22 August 1553 on Tower Hill after having recanted his Protestant faith.

Following Wyatt's rebellion, Guildford Dudley was beheaded on 12 February 1554 shortly before his wife. Knowing the Queen's character, in June 1554, Jane Dudley pleaded with the authorities to allow her remaining sons to hear mass. During 1554, the Duchess and her son-in-law, Henry Sidney, worked hard pleading with the Spanish nobles around England's new king consort, Philip of Spain. Lord Paget may also have proved helpful, and Henry Sidney even traveled to Spain in their cause. In the autumn of 1554 the Dudley brothers were released from the Tower, although the eldest, John, died immediately afterwards at Sidney's house in Penshurst, Kent. At the same location, Philip Sidney was born on 30 November 1554. His godmother was his grandmother Jane Dudley, while his godfather was Philip of Spain.

Amid the confiscation of the Dudley family's possessions in July 1553, Mary had allowed Jane Dudley to retain her wardrobe and plate, carpets, and other household stuffs, as well as the use of the Duke's house in Chelsea, London, where she died on either 15 or 22 January 1555, and was buried on 1 February at Chelsea Old Church.

In her will, she tried to provide for her sons financially and thanked the Queen, as well as the many Spanish nobles whom she had lobbied. The Duchess of Alba was to receive her green parrot; to Don Diego de Acevedo she gave "the new bed of green velvet with all the furniture to it; beseeching him even as he hath in my lifetime showed himself like a father and a brother to my sons, so shall [I] require him no less to do now their mother is gone". She also remembered "my lord, my dear husband", and stipulated: "in no wise let me be opened after I am dead. ... I have not lived to be very bold before women, much more I should be loth to come into the hands of any living man, be he Physician or Surgeon." She avoided being specific on religion, but stressed that "who ever doth trust to this transitory world, as I did, may happen to have an overthrow, as I had; therefore to the worms will I go as I have before written."
