= Thomas Copley =

English Jesuit missionary

The Reverend Thomas Copley SJ
- Born: c. 1595; Madrid, Spain
- Died: 1652 (aged 56–57); Province of Maryland, British America

Thomas Copley, alias Philip Fisher (1596 – 1652) was an English Jesuit missionary in North America.

Copley Hall, a residence hall at Georgetown University, is named after Thomas Copley.

== Life ==
He was the eldest son of William Copley of Gatton, England, and grandson of Sir Thomas Copley, of a recusant family. He arrived in Maryland in 1637, and, being a man of great executive ability, took over the care of the mission, "a charge which at that time required rather business men than missionaries".

In 1645, Fisher was arrested and carried in chains to England, with Father Andrew White, the founder of the English mission in America. After enduring hardships he was released, and returned to Maryland (February, 1648). He made an effort to enter Virginia; this appears from a letter written 1 March 1648, to the Jesuit General Vincenzo Carafa in Rome, in which he says:

A road has lately been opened through the forest to Virginia; this will make it but a two days' journey, and both places can now be united in one mission. After Easter I shall wait upon the Governor of Virginia upon business of great importance.

There is no further record bearing on the projected visit. Neill, in his "Terra Mariae" (p. 70), and Smith in his "Religion under the Barons of Baltimore" (p. VII), confuse this Father Thomas Copley of Maryland with an apostate Catholic, John Copley, who was never a Jesuit. Father Fisher is mentioned in the missionary annals of Maryland, and, according to Hughes, was "the most distinguished man among the fourteen Jesuits who had worked in Maryland".
