= John Guildford =

16th-century English politician

Sir John Guildford, JP (by 1508 – 1565), of Hemsted in Benenden, also written Guilford, was an English landowner, administrator and politician.

== Origins ==
Born by 1508, he was the only son of George Guildford (died by 1537), of Hemsted, who was the second son of Sir Richard Guildford and his first wife Anne, daughter of John Pympe, of Nettlestead. His mother was Elizabeth, only daughter and heiress of Robert Mortimer (died 1485 at Bosworth), of Thorpe-le-Soken, and his wife Isabel, daughter of John Howard, 1st Duke of Norfolk. He had two sisters: Mary, who married Sir Owen West (died 1551), and Anne, who married first Walter Woodland and secondly Richard Lynne.

== Life ==
In 1529, in his early 20s, was elected MP for Gatton, a seat controlled by Sir Roger Copley, who was not only his stepmother's brother but also his wife's uncle. His own uncles, Sir Edward Guildford and Sir Henry Guildford, were the knights of the shire for Kent. He may have sat for Gatton in later Parliaments, but the records are lost.

Once the parliamentary sessions were over, in 1530 he enrolled at Gray's Inn to study law. When his uncle Edward died in 1534 without leaving a written will, John claimed that by last wishes spoken at the deathbed he was heir to the manor of Halden and other lands in Kent and Sussex. As this was disputed by Edward's only surviving child Jane and her husband, then known as Sir John Dudley, in the end he was unable to secure the estates, though the episode had an aftermath many years later.

In 1534 he was appointed bailiff of Winchelsea, holding the post for life, and about 1537 inherited his father's property. As a landowner, he was made a justice of the peace for Kent and, in 1542, he was knighted, sitting that year in Parliament as knight of the shire for Kent and thereafter sitting on various commissions involving the county.

By 1546 he had been named as chamberlain of the household of Anne of Cleves, the discarded wife of King Henry VIII, and on the death of the King had to negotiate with the Privy Council on her behalf. While he secured continuing payment for her staff, she was however required to vacate Bletchingley and move to Penshurst Place, where he was still looking after her interests in 1550.

In 1552 he was chosen as High Sheriff of Kent and again came to the attention of John Dudley, now Duke of Northumberland and effective ruler of England while King Edward VI was still a minor. Dudley gave him the lease of some of the lands the two had disputed nearly twenty years earlier and in July 1553, two days before the sickly young king's death, ordered him to raise a company of 30 men. Three days after the king's death, he was required to send at least two gentlemen from Kent to join Dudley's force backing the claim to the throne of his daughter-in-law Lady Jane Grey.

It seems Guildford was not compromised by the failed coup, being reappointed to the bench under Queen Mary I and in October 1553 he may have sat as MP for New Romney, the records being unclear. When Queen Elizabeth I came to the throne in 1558, he was removed from the commission of the peace and took no further part in public life.

On 4 May 1560 he made his will, asking to be buried beside his first wife in the church of Benenden and leaving to his eldest son the mansion house and manor of Hemsted with its contents, including weapons and armour, while his younger sons had generous legacies and funds for their education. His executors were named as Sir Warham St Leger and the MP Sir John Mason.

He died on 5 July 1565, with his will being proved six days later.

== Family ==
Before 1534 he married Barbara (died by 1550), the daughter of Thomas West, 8th Baron de la Warr, and his third wife Eleanor, daughter of Sir Roger Copley. Among their twelve children were:

Sir Thomas (died 1575), MP for Gatton in 1552, who married Elizabeth, daughter of his stepmother Mary and her first husband John Shelley.
Dorothy (died 1584), who married Sir Thomas Walsingham (died 1584) and was the mother of Sir Thomas Walsingham, patron of Christopher Marlowe.
Jane, who married Robert Cranmer (died 1619), of Chepsted in Chevening, and was mother of Anne, who was first wife of the MP Sir Arthur Harris.
Elizabeth, who married as his second wife the MP William Cromer (died 1598), of Tunstall, Kent, a Sheriff of Kent.
Mary, who married as his first wife George Harlakenden (died 1565), of Harlakenden in Woodchurch, Kent.
Anne (died 1580), who married first Walter Mayne (died 1572), of Biddenden, and secondly the MP Levin Bufkin, of Gore Court in Otham.

After 1550, he married secondly Mary, widow of John Shelley (died 1550), of Michelgrove in Clapham, Sussex, and daughter of Sir William Fitzwilliam, of Milton Malsor in Northamptonshire. They had a son Richard.
