= Gatton (constituency) =

Parliamentary borough in Surrey, UK

- Former borough constituency for the House of Commons

1450–1832
- Seats: Two
- Replaced by: East Surrey

Gatton was a parliamentary borough in Surrey, one of the most notorious of all the rotten boroughs. It elected two Members of Parliament (MPs) to the House of Commons from 1450 until 1832, when the constituency was abolished by the Great Reform Act. Around the time of that Act it was often held up by reformers as the epitome of what was wrong with the unreformed system.

== History ==
The borough consisted of part of the parish of Gatton, near Reigate, between London and Brighton. It included the manor and estate of Gatton Park. Gatton was no more than a village, with a population in 1831 of 146, and 23 houses of which as few as six may have been within the borough.

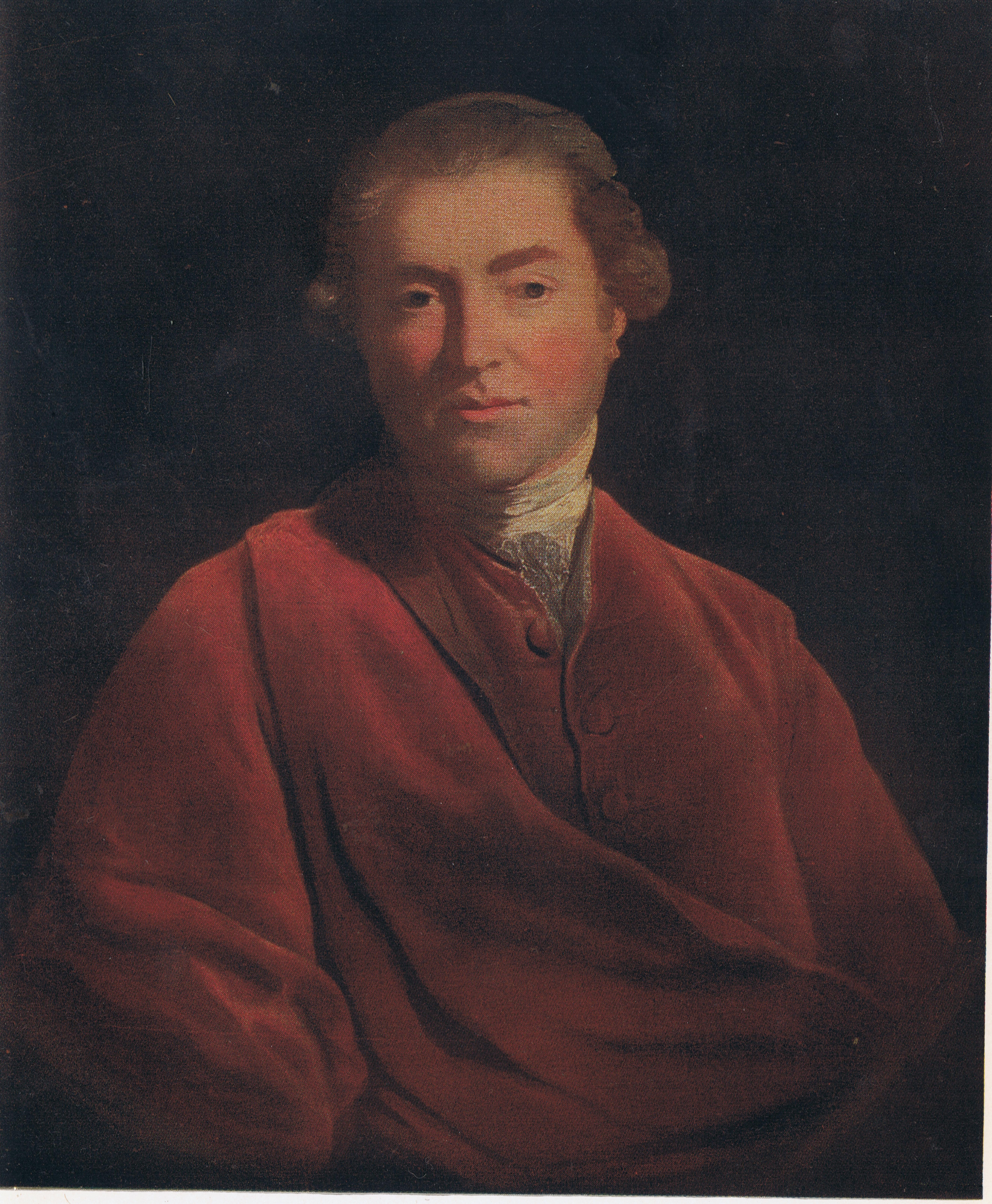
Robert Mayne (1724–1782), MP for Upper Gatton, by Joshua Reynolds.

The right to vote was extended to all freeholders and inhabitants paying scot and lot; but this apparently wide franchise was normally meaningless in tiny Gatton: there were only 7 qualified voters in 1831, and the number had sometimes fallen as low as two. This position had existed long before the 19th century: Gatton was one of the first of the English boroughs to come under the total dominance of a "patron": in the reign of Henry VIII, when Gatton's representation was only a century old, Sir Roger Copley described himself as "its burgess and only inhabitant". In these circumstances, the local landowners had no difficulty in maintaining absolute control, and for most of the 16th century it was the Copleys who held this power. However, the Copleys were Roman Catholics, and this caused difficulties in the later Elizabethan period: the head of the family, Thomas Copley, went into voluntary exile abroad, and when his wife and child returned to England after his death she was soon caught harbouring a Catholic priest. The Sheriff and Deputy Lieutenants of Surrey were directed by the Privy Council to ensure that Gatton made its choice free from any influence by Mrs Copley; the sheriff's precept for the election was directed not to the Lord of the manor but to the parish constable; and it seems that between 1584 and 1621 the humble villagers of Gatton may have genuinely elected their MPs in their own right.

In the 1750s, Sir James Colebrooke (Lord of the manor of Gatton) nominated for one seat and the Rev John Tattersall (Lord of the manor of nearby Upper Gatton) the other. In 1774, Sir William Mayne (later Lord Newhaven) bought both manors and therefore control of both seats; from 1786 onwards they changed hands several times more, ending in the hands of Sir Mark Wood by the turn of the century. The borough was sold again in 1830, at a reported price of £180,000, despite the prospect of disenfranchisement; in the same year, while the ownership of the borough was under the administration of a broker, one of its seats in the new Parliament was sold for £1,200.

The small edifice, known as the town hall, where the elections are said to have taken place can still be seen today. Most of the site of the former constituency is now occupied by The Royal Alexandra and Albert School.

== Contested election ==
Even though Gatton elections were entirely in the hands of the Lord of the manor, there was a contested by-election on 24 January 1803. James Dashwood, one of the sitting members, was persuaded to resign to allow Philip Dundas (nephew of Pitt's ally Henry Dundas) to take a seat in Parliament. However, Joseph Clayton Jennings, a barrister who supported Parliamentary reform, arrived to contest the election together with a group of radical supporters. Jennings obtained one vote from a man claiming to be entitled to vote, but Dashwood (the returning officer) rejected it; hence Dundas was returned by 1 vote to nil.

A garbled version of the 1803 by-election was included by Henry Stooks Smith in The Parliaments of England from 1715 to 1847, as the supposed story of a by-election in 1816, at which Sir Mark Wood, 2nd Baronet was returned. Stooks Smith wrote:

Mr Jennings was Sir Mark Wood's butler. There were only three voters, Sir Mark, his son, and Jennings. The son was away and Jennings and his master quarrelled upon which Jennings refused to second the son and proposed himself. To get a seconder for the son, Sir Mark had to second Jennings, and it was ultimately arranged, and the vote of Sir Mark alone given. This was the only contest within memory.

The History of Parliament notes that this story "has not been confirmed". Gatton's representation was abolished by the Reform Act in 1832.

== Members of Parliament ==
=== 1510–1640 ===
Parliament	First member	Second member
1510–1523	No names known	
1529	John Guildford	?William Saunders
1536	?	
1539	?	
1542	Thomas Saunders	Thomas Bishop
1545	Edward Bellingham	Roger Heigham
1547	Richard Shelley	John Tingleden, died and replaced by Jan 1552 by Thomas Guildford
1553 (Mar)	Richard Southwell alias Darcy	Leonard Dannett
1553 (Oct)	Sir Thomas Cornwallis	Chidiock Paulet
1554 (Apr)	Thomas Gatacre	Thomas Copley
1554 (Nov)	William Wootton	Thomas Copley
1555	Humphrey Moseley	Sir Henry Hussey
1558	Thomas Copley	Thomas Norton
1558–9	Thomas Copley	Thomas Farnham
1562–3	Sir Robert Lane	Thomas Copley
1571	Edmund Slyfield	Edward Whitton
1572	Edmund Tilney	Roland Maylard
1584	Francis Bacon, sat for Melcombe Regis and replaced by Edward Browne	Thomas Bishopp
1586	Serjeant John Puckering	Edward Browne
1588	Richard Browne	John Herbert
1593	William Lane	George Buc
1597	George Buc	Michael Hicks
1601	Sir Matthew Browne	Richard Sondes
1604–1611	Sir Thomas Gresham	Sir Nicholas Saunders
1614	Sir Thomas Gresham	Sir John Brooke
1621	Sir Thomas Gresham	Sir Thomas Bludder
1624	Sir Edmund Bowyer	Samuel Owfield
1625	Sir Charles Howard	Thomas Crewe
1626	Sir Samuel Owfield	Sir Charles Howard
1628	Sir Samuel Owfield	Sir Charles Howard
1629–1640	No Parliaments summoned	

=== 1640–1832 ===
Year	First member	First party	Second member	Second party
November 1640	Sir Samuel Owfield	Parliamentarian	Double return for second seat, not resolved until 1641	
November 1641	Sir Samuel Owfield	Parliamentarian	Thomas Sandys	Parliamentarian
1644	Owfield died – seat left vacant		Thomas Sandys	Parliamentarian
1645	William Owfield		Thomas Sandys	Parliamentarian
December 1648	Sandys and Owfield excluded in Pride's Purge – both seats vacant			
1653	Gatton was unrepresented in the Barebones Parliament and the First and Second Parliaments of the Protectorate			
January 1659	Edward Bishe		Thomas Turgis	
May 1659	Not represented in the restored Rump			
April 1660	Sir Edmund Bowyer		Thomas Turgis	
1661	William Owfield		Thomas Turgis	
1664	Sir Nicholas Carew		Thomas Turgis	
1685	Sir John Thompson, Bt		Thomas Turgis	
1696	George Evelyn		Thomas Turgis	
1698	Hon. Maurice Thompson		Thomas Turgis	
1702	Hon. Maurice Thompson		Thomas Onslow	
1705	Sir George Newland		Paul Docminique	
1710	William Newland		Paul Docminique	
1735	William Newland		Charles Docminique	
1738	Professor George Newland		Charles Docminique	
1745	Professor George Newland		Paul Humphrey	
1749	Charles Knowles		Paul Humphrey	
1751	Charles Knowles		(Sir) James Colebrooke	
1752	William Bateman		(Sir) James Colebrooke	
1754	Thomas Brand		(Sir) James Colebrooke	
1761	Thomas Brand		Lieutenant-Colonel Edward Harvey	
1768	Hon. John Damer		Joseph Martin	
October 1774	Sir William Mayne		Robert Scott	
December 1774	Robert Mayne		William Adam	
1780	Robert Mayne		The Lord Newhaven	
1782	Maurice Lloyd		The Lord Newhaven	
1787	James Fraser		The Lord Newhaven	
1790	John Nesbitt		William Currie	
May 1796	John Petrie		Sir Gilbert Heathcote, Bt	
November 1796	John Petrie		John Heathcote	
1799	John Petrie		(Sir) Walter Stirling	
1800	James Du Pre		(Sir) Walter Stirling	
1802	Sir Mark Wood, Bt		James Dashwood	
1803	Sir Mark Wood, Bt		Philip Dundas	
1805	Sir Mark Wood, Bt		William Garrow	
1806	Sir Mark Wood, Bt		James Athol Wood	
1807	Sir Mark Wood, Bt		George Bellas Greenough	
1812	Sir Mark Wood, Bt		William Congreve	
1816	Sir Mark Wood, Bt	Tory	William Congreve	
1818	Abel Rous Dottin		John Fleming	
1820	Jesse Watts-Russell		Thomas Divett	
1826	William Scott		Michael Prendergast	
Mar 1830	Joseph Neeld		Michael Prendergast	
July 1830	John Shelley		John Thomas Hope	Tory
1831	Viscount Pollington		Anthony John Ashley	
1832	Constituency abolished			
