= Richard Shelley (grand prior) =

Member of the Parliament of England

Richard Shelley (c. 1513 – c. 1589) was a diplomat and the last acting grand prior of the Knights of Saint John in England.

== Life ==
Richard Shelley, born about 1513, was second son of Sir William Shelley. Like various other members of the family, he became a Knight of St John, and about 1535 was sent abroad to complete his education. In August of that year he carried letters from Thomas Starkey to (Sir) Richard Morison, who was then at Rome, and in 1538 Shelley was at Venice. But, growing "wearier of this scholastical life than he can express", he set out early in May 1539 for Constantinople in the company of the Venetian ambassador. The journey was overland, and took four months; the ambassador died on the way, and Shelley remained at Constantinople under the protection of the French ambassador.

Shelley claimed to be the first Englishman to visit Constantinople since its capture by the Turks. During his absence the order of St. John was suppressed in 1540, and Shelley entered the king's service, being employed on various diplomatic missions. In 1547 he was in Parliament as member for Gatton.

Early in 1549 he was sent to the king of France, and in October 1550 Sir John Mason suggested his despatch as special commissioner to the same monarch, "being fully qualified by his knowledge of the language and previous experience". In October and November 1551, Mr Edward Dudley, he escorted Mary of Guise through England on her return from France to Scotland. In June 1552 he was again abroad, and on 11 July 1553 he was sent to Brussels with despatches to Charles V, announcing the death of Edward VI and succession of Queen Jane. He waited, however, to see how events would turn out in England, and on the accession of Mary I of England returned without delivering his despatches. In January 1553–4 he was at Vienna as envoy to the king of the Romans, and in May 1555 he received a passport and letters to the king of Portugal and to the regent of Spain written in anticipation of the birth of a child to Mary. In January 1556–7 he was sent by Mary to the Duchess of Parma, regent of the Netherlands, to invite her to England.

Meanwhile, Mary had resolved to restore the order of St. John in England, and Shelley was actively employed in making the necessary arrangements. On the re-establishment of the order in April 1557 Shelley was made turcopolier, an office second in dignity to that of grand prior, which was conferred on Thomas Tresham I (died 1559). He was also given the commanderies of Halston and Slebech. In the autumn of 1558 he was sent to Malta, but fell ill at Brussels, where he heard of Mary's death. He was deterred from returning to England by the violence of the Protestant outbreaks in December. The following year he was sent on an embassy to the king of the Romans, and then made his way to Spain, where Philip gave him a pension. The efforts made by the English ambassador at Madrid to induce him to return to England were in vain, but Shelley protested his complete loyalty to the queen. As the relations between England and Spain grew strained, Shelley left for Malta, but at Genoa was recalled by Philip to go as his ambassador to Persia. He did not start on this mission, but in October 1562 was sent by Philip to congratulate the new king of the Romans on his election. In July 1565 he set out for Malta, which was then closely besieged by the Turks, but got no further than Naples, and did not reach Malta until the Turks had retired.

On Tresham's death in 1566 Shelley became grand prior of England of the knights of St. John, but did not assume the title out of deference to Elizabeth's wishes. The office of turcopolier, hitherto confined exclusively to Englishmen, was annexed to the grand-mastership.

About 1569 Shelley left Malta, being unable to agree with Pietro del Monte, who in the previous year had succeeded Jean Parisot de Valette as grand master of the order. He established himself at Venice on the invitation of the seignory, and there sought to ingratiate himself with the English government by sending secret intelligence of jesuit and other intrigues against Elizabeth I of England. He also made himself useful by looking after English commercial interests, and in 1583, in answer to his repeated requests, he was granted leave to return to England with liberty to practise his religion. But he was still under suspicion; he had held communications with William Parry (died 1585) at Venice; most of his relatives in England were recusants, and his nephew Richard Shelley was implicated in treasonable proceedings, for which he was examined by the council. Shelley remained at Venice, where he was treated with distinction. He died there about 1589.

Very many of his letters are among the Harleian and Lansdowne manuscript collections at the British Museum. A selection of these was published in 1774. To illustrate these, two of Shelley's medals preserved in the king's collection (now in the British Museum) were engraved by James Basire, and published as a frontispiece to the volume. Two of his letters to Henry VIII, complaining of his treatment of the order, were stolen from the government library at Malta soon after 1848. According to his own account, he also wrote a treatise in answer to a book by Nicholas Sanders, which came into the pope's hands, and brought him into suspicion. It does not seem to have been printed.
