= Leonard Dannett =

16th-century English politician

Leonard Dannett (by 1530 – 1591) was an English politician.

He was the son of Sir John Dannett (d. 1542), whose family were prominent among the Leicestershire gentry and who had inherited extensive estates in Warwickshire, Kent and Surrey through his father Gerard's marriage to a co-heir of Sir Edward Belknap. His mother was Anne, the daughter and sole heiress of Thomas Ellinbridge of Merstham, Surrey, whose guardianship had been acquired by his father. He was admitted to the Middle Temple in 1551.

He was a Member (MP) of the Parliament of England for Gatton in March 1553 through the influence of his cousin Thomas Copley, whose mother was the patron. He was among the gentry who, driven by family ties, supported the Henry Grey, Duke of Suffolk in the Leicestershire rising of 1554. In 1563 he sat for Marlborough through the influence of Edward Seymour, who had clandestinely married the duke's daughter.

He became a JP in Leicestershire in 1561 and Warwickshire in 1574, but his removal from both benches in the 1580s suggest he may have been suspected of Catholic sympathies. He married twice, but had no children and his estate passed to his brother John.
