= John Dudley, 1st Duke of Northumberland =

English military officer and politician (1504–1553)

His Grace The Duke of Northumberland
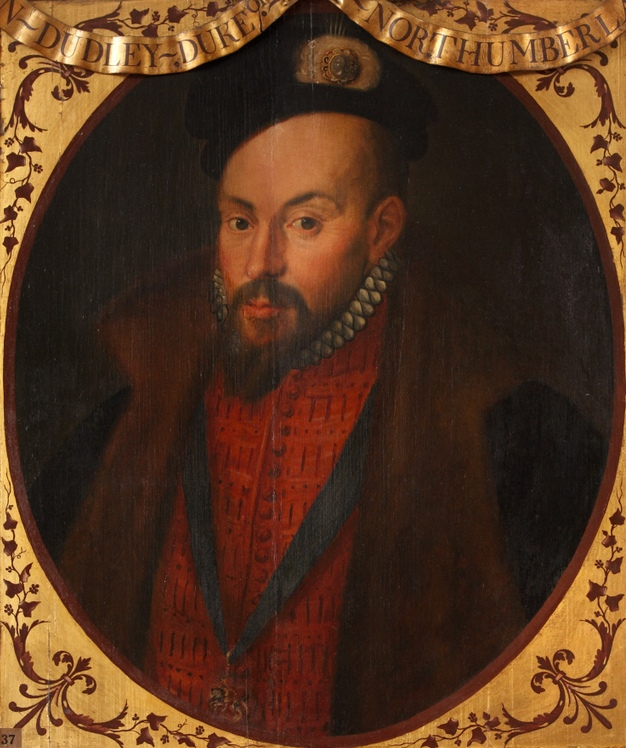
- Posthumous portrait, c. 1607

Personal details
- Born: John Dudley; 1504 London, England
- Died: 22 August 1553 (aged 48–49) Tower Hill, London, England
- Cause of death: Beheaded
- Resting place: Chapel Royal of St. Peter ad Vincula, Tower of London; 51°30′31″N 0°4′37″W
- Spouse: Jane Guildford (m. 1525)
- Children: Sir Henry Dudley; Thomas Dudley; John Dudley, 2nd Earl of Warwick; Ambrose Dudley, 3rd Earl of Warwick; Henry Dudley; Robert Dudley, 1st Earl of Leicester; Lord Guildford Dudley; Mary Dudley, Lady Sidney; Charles Dudley; Katherine Hastings, Countess of Huntingdon; Temperance Dudley; Margaret Dudley; Katherine Dudley
- Parents: Edmund Dudley; Elizabeth Grey, 6th Baroness Lisle

John Dudley, 1st Duke of Northumberland (1504 – 22 August 1553) was an English military officer and politician, who led the government of the young King Edward VI from 1550 until 1553, and unsuccessfully tried to install Lady Jane Grey on the English throne after the King's death. Dudley served as Vice-Admiral and Lord High Admiral from 1537 until 1547, during which time he set novel standards of navy organisation and was an innovative commander at sea. He also developed a strong interest in overseas exploration. Dudley took part in the 1544 campaigns in Scotland and France and was one of Henry VIII's intimates in the last years of the reign. He was also a leader of the religious reform party at court.

== Early Life & Marriage ==
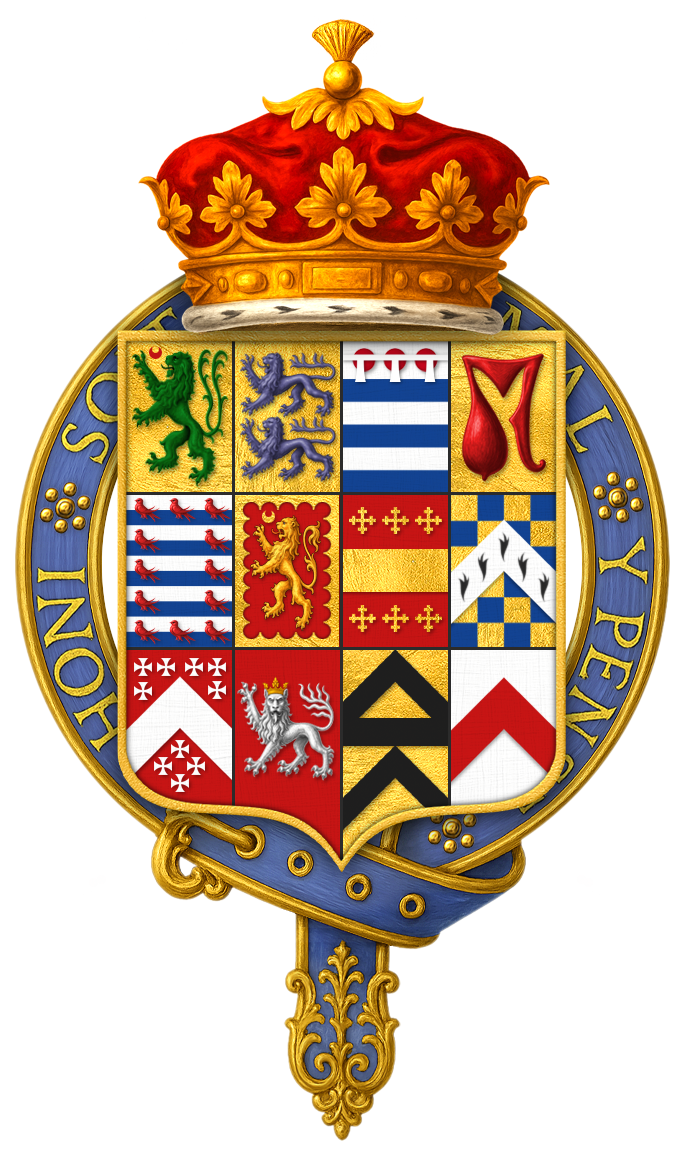
Garter-encircled Arms of John Dudley as Duke of Northumberland (SVG version available here)

John Dudley was the eldest of three sons of Edmund Dudley, a councillor of Henry VII, and his second wife Elizabeth Grey, daughter of Edward Grey, 1st Viscount Lisle. His father was attainted and executed for high treason in 1510, having been arrested immediately after Henry VIII's accession because the new king needed scapegoats for his predecessor's unpopular financial policies.

In 1512, the seven-year-old John became the ward of Sir Edward Guildford and was taken into his household. At the same time Edmund Dudley's attainder was lifted and John Dudley was restored "in name and blood". The King was hoping for the good services "which the said John Dudley is likely to do".

At about age 15 John Dudley probably went with his guardian to the Pale of Calais to serve there for the next years. He took part in Cardinal Thomas Wolsey's diplomatic voyages of 1521 and 1527, and was knighted at Roye by Charles Brandon, 1st Duke of Suffolk, during his first major military experience, the 1523 invasion of France. In 1524 Dudley became a Knight of the Body, and from 1534 he was responsible for the King's body armour as Master of the Tower Armoury.

Being "the most skilful of his generation, both on foot and on horseback", he excelled in wrestling, archery, and the tournaments of the royal court, as a French report stated as late as 1546.

In 1525, Dudley married Guildford's daughter Jane, who was four years his junior and his former classmate. The Dudleys belonged to the new evangelical circles of the early 1530s, and their 13 children were educated in Renaissance humanism and science.

Whilst the number of children that the Duke and Duchess bore is not contested, the names and lives of the thirteen frequently are. Chalmer's General Biographical Dictionary states eight sons and five daughters but lists only eleven: John, Ambrose, Robert, Guildford, Henry,Charles, Margaret, Temperance, Catherine (1/2), Mary, and Catherine (2/2). North American family Histories states the above and also Thomas and a second Henry, with Thomas, Charles, Margaret, the second Catherine, and Temperance all dying in early childhood. Sir Edward Guildford died in 1534 without a written will. His only son having predeceased him, Guildford's nephew, John Guildford, asserted that his uncle had intended him to inherit. Dudley and his wife contested this claim. The parties went to court and Dudley, who had secured Thomas Cromwell's patronage, won the case.

In 1532, he lent his cousin, John Sutton, 3rd Baron Dudley, over £7,000 on the security of the baronial estate. Lord Dudley was unable to pay off any of his creditors, so when the mortgage was foreclosed in the late 1530s Sir John Dudley came into possession of Dudley Castle.

== Service to the Tudors ==
Dudley was present at Henry VIII's meeting with Francis I of France at Calais in 1532. Another member of the entourage was Anne Boleyn, who was soon to be queen. Dudley took part in the christenings of the King's children, Elizabeth and Edward and, in connection with the announcement of the Prince's birth to the Emperor, travelled to Spain via France in October 1537. He sat in the Reformation parliament for Kent, in place of his deceased father-in-law, in 1534–1536, and led one of the contingents sent against the Pilgrimage of Grace in late 1536.

He was Master of the Horse to Anne of Cleves and Catherine Howard, and in 1542 returned to the House of Commons as MP for Staffordshire but was soon promoted to the House of Lords following 12 March 1542, when he became Viscount Lisle after the death of his stepfather Arthur Plantagenet, Henry VIII's uncle, and "by the right of his mother".

In 1547, Dudley was created Earl of Warwick and, with the Duke of Somerset, England's Lord Protector, distinguished himself in the renewed Scottish war at the Battle of Pinkie Cleugh. During the country-wide uprisings of 1549 Dudley put down Kett's Rebellion in Norfolk. Convinced of the Protector's incompetence, he and other privy councillors forced Somerset out of office in October 1549. Having averted a conservative reaction in religion and a plot to destroy him alongside Somerset, Dudley emerged in early 1550 as de facto regent for the 12-year-old Edward VI. He reconciled himself with Somerset, who nevertheless soon began to intrigue against him and his policies. Somerset was executed on largely fabricated charges, three months after Dudley had been raised to the Dukedom of Northumberland in October 1551.

As Lord President of the Council, Dudley headed a distinctly conciliar government and sought to introduce the adolescent King into business. Taking over an almost bankrupt administration, he ended the costly wars with France and Scotland and tackled finances in ways that led to some economic recovery. To prevent further uprisings he introduced countrywide policing on a local basis, appointing lord-lieutenants who were in close contact with the central authority. Dudley's religious policy was — in accordance with Edward's religion — decidedly Protestant, further enforcing the English Reformation and promoting radical reformers to high Church positions.

The 15-year-old King fell ill in early 1553 and excluded his half-sisters, Mary and Elizabeth, whom he regarded as illegitimate, from the succession, designating non-existent, hypothetical male heirs. As his death approached, Edward changed his will so that his Protestant cousin Lady Jane Grey, Northumberland's daughter-in-law, could inherit the Crown.

To what extent the Duke influenced this scheme is uncertain. The traditional view is that it was Northumberland's plot to maintain his power by placing his family on the throne. Many historians see the project as genuinely Edward's, enforced by Dudley after the King's death. The Duke did not prepare well for this occasion. Having marched to East Anglia to capture Mary, he surrendered on hearing that the Privy Council had changed sides and proclaimed Mary as queen.

Convicted of high treason, Northumberland returned to Catholicism and abjured the Protestant faith before his execution on 22 August 1553. Having secured the contempt of both religious camps, popularly hated, and a natural scapegoat, he became the "wicked Duke" — in contrast to his predecessor Somerset, the "good Duke". Only since the 1970s has he also been seen as a Tudor Crown servant: self-serving, inherently loyal to the incumbent monarch, and an able statesman in difficult times.

== Rise to Admiralty ==
In January 1537, Dudley was made Vice-Admiral and began to apply himself to naval matters.

In the aftermath of the Battle of Solway Moss in 1542, he served as Warden of the Scottish Marches, and in the 1544 campaign the English force under Edward Seymour, Earl of Hertford, was supported by a fleet which Dudley commanded. Dudley joined the land force that destroyed Edinburgh, after he had blown the main gate apart with a culverin.

In late 1544 he was appointed Governor of Boulogne, the siege of which had cost the life of his eldest son, Henry. His tasks were to rebuild the fortifications to King Henry's design and to fend off French attacks by sea and land.Being now a peer, Dudley became Lord High Admiral and a Knight of the Garter in 1543; he was also admitted to the Privy Council.

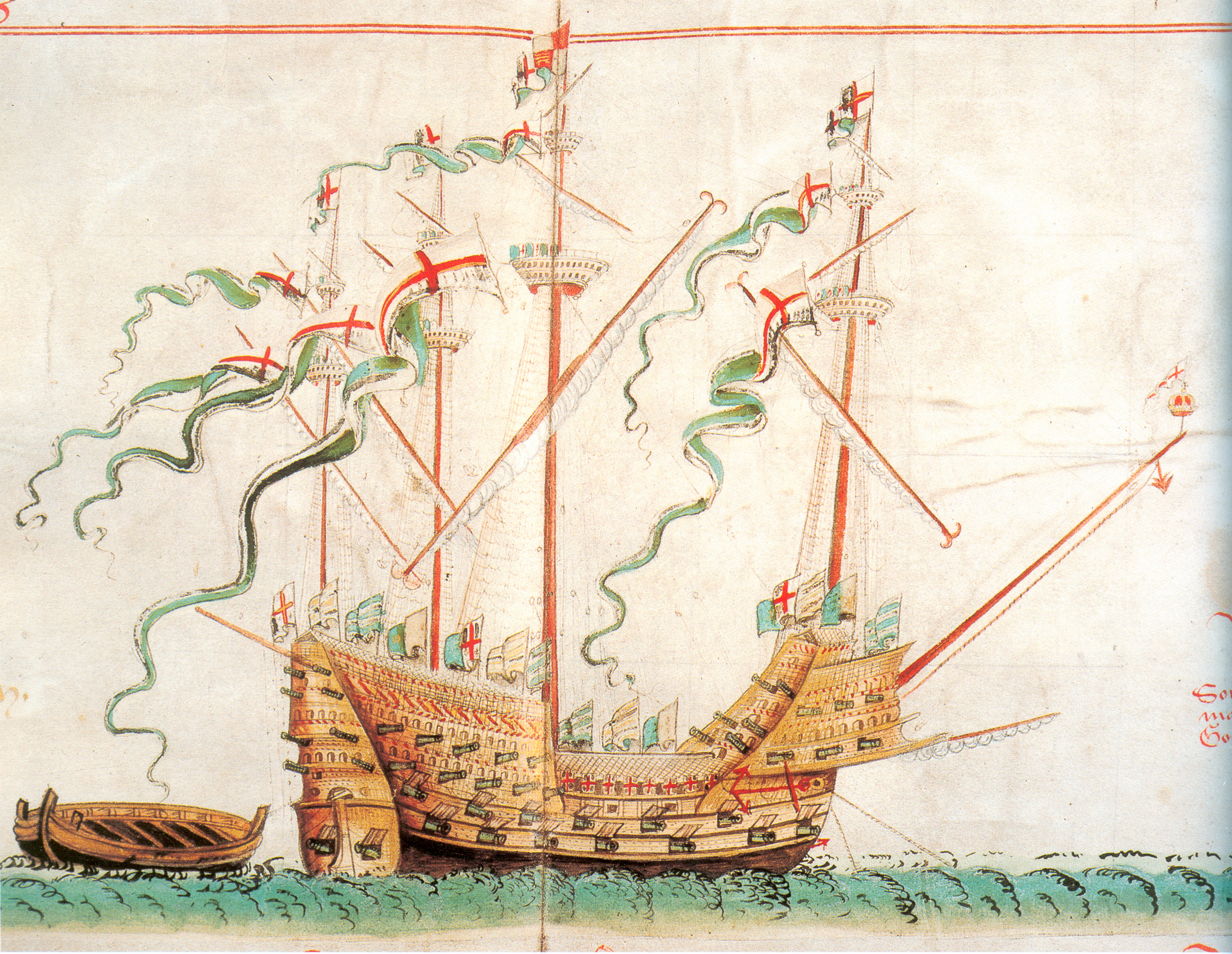
In 1545, Lord High Admiral John Dudley, Viscount Lisle, welcomed King Henry VIII on board the Henri Grace a Dieu, popularly called Great Harry.

As Lord Admiral, Dudley was responsible for creating the Council for Marine Causes, which for the first time co-ordinated the various tasks of maintaining the navy functioning and thus made English naval administration the most efficient in Europe. At sea, Dudley's fighting orders were at the forefront of tactical thinking: Squadrons of ships, ordered by size and firepower, were to manoeuvre in formation, using co-ordinated gunfire. These were all new developments in the English navy.

In 1545, he directed the fleet's operations before, during, and after the Battle of the Solent and entertained King Henry on the flagship Henri Grace a Dieu. A tragic loss was the sinking of the Mary Rose with 500 men aboard. In 1546 John Dudley went to France for peace negotiations. When he suspected the Admiral of France, Claude d'Annebault, of manoeuvres which might have led to a renewal of hostilities, he suddenly put to sea in a show of English strength, before returning to the negotiating table. He then travelled to Fontainebleau, where the English delegates were entertained by the Dauphin Henri and King Francis. In the Peace of Camp, the French king acknowledged Henry VIII's title as "Supreme Head of the Church of England and Ireland", a success for both England and her Lord Admiral.

In 1547, Dudley was created Earl of Warwick and, with the Duke of Somerset, England's Lord Protector, distinguished himself in the renewed Scottish war at the Battle of Pinkie Cleugh. During the country-wide uprisings of 1549 Dudley put down Kett's Rebellion in Norfolk. Convinced of the Protector's incompetence, he and other privy councillors forced Somerset out of office in October 1549. Having averted a conservative reaction in religion and a plot to destroy him alongside Somerset, Dudley emerged in early 1550 as de facto regent for the 12-year-old Edward VI. He reconciled himself with Somerset, who nevertheless soon began to intrigue against him and his policies. Somerset was executed on largely fabricated charges, three months after Dudley had been raised to the Dukedom of Northumberland in October 1551.

As Lord President of the Council, Dudley headed a distinctly conciliar government and sought to introduce the adolescent King into business. Taking over an almost bankrupt administration, he ended the costly wars with France and Scotland and tackled finances in ways that led to some economic recovery. To prevent further uprisings he introduced countrywide policing on a local basis, appointing lord-lieutenants who were in close contact with the central authority. Dudley's religious policy was — in accordance with Edward's religion — decidedly Protestant, further enforcing the English Reformation and promoting radical reformers to high Church positions.

== Life at Court ==
John Dudley, popularly fêted and highly regarded by King Henry as a general, became a royal intimate who played cards with the ailing monarch. Next to Edward Seymour, Prince Edward's maternal uncle, Dudley was one of the leaders of the Reformed party at court, and both their wives were among the friends of Anne Askew, the Protestant martyr destroyed by Bishop Stephen Gardiner in July 1546. Dudley and the Queen's brother, William Parr, 1st Earl of Essex, tried to convince Anne Askew to conform to the Catholic doctrines of the Henrician Church, yet she replied "it was great shame for them to counsel contrary to their knowledge". In September Dudley struck Gardiner in the face during a full meeting of the council. This was a grave offence, and he was lucky to escape with a month's leave from court in disgrace. In the last weeks of the reign Seymour and Dudley played their parts in Henry's strike against the conservative House of Howard, thus clearing the path for a Protestant minority rule. They were seen as the likely leaders of the impending regency—"there are no other nobles of a fit age and ability for the task", Eustache Chapuys, the former Imperial ambassador, commented from his retirement.

In 1547, Dudley was created Earl of Warwick and, with the Duke of Somerset, England's Lord Protector, distinguished himself in the renewed Scottish war at the Battle of Pinkie Cleugh. During the country-wide uprisings of 1549 Dudley put down Kett's Rebellion in Norfolk. Convinced of the Protector's incompetence, he and other privy councillors forced Somerset out of office in October 1549. Having averted a conservative reaction in religion and a plot to destroy him alongside Somerset, Dudley emerged in early 1550 as de facto regent for the 12-year-old Edward VI. He reconciled himself with Somerset, who nevertheless soon began to intrigue against him and his policies. Somerset was executed on largely fabricated charges, three months after Dudley had been raised to the Dukedom of Northumberland in October 1551.

As Lord President of the Council, Dudley headed a distinctly conciliar government and sought to introduce the adolescent King into business. Taking over an almost bankrupt administration, he ended the costly wars with France and Scotland and tackled finances in ways that led to some economic recovery. To prevent further uprisings he introduced countrywide policing on a local basis, appointing lord-lieutenants who were in close contact with the central authority. Dudley's religious policy was — in accordance with Edward's religion — decidedly Protestant, further enforcing the English Reformation and promoting radical reformers to high Church positions.

== From Earl of Warwick to Duke of Northumberland ==
The 16 executors of Henry VIII's will also embodied the Regency Council that had been appointed to rule collectively during Edward VI's minority. The new Council agreed on making Edward Seymour, Earl of Hertford Lord Protector with full powers, which in effect were those of a prince. At the same time the Council awarded themselves a round of promotions based on Henry VIII's wishes; the Earl of Hertford became the Duke of Somerset and John Dudley was created Earl of Warwick. (Note: Claims that he was the grandson of a carpenter notwithstanding, John Dudley was of noble ancestry. His paternal great-grandfather was John Sutton, 1st Baron Dudley. On his mother's side he descended from the Hundred Years War heroes, Richard Beauchamp, Earl of Warwick, and John Talbot, 1st Earl of Shrewsbury. He accordingly assumed the bear and the ragged staff, the arms of the medieval Earls of Warwick (Wilson 1981 pp. 1, 3; Adams 2002 pp. 312–313).) The new Earl had to pass on his post of Lord Admiral to Somerset's brother, Thomas Seymour, but advanced to Lord Great Chamberlain. Perceived as the most important man next the Protector, he was on friendly terms with Somerset, who soon reopened the war with Scotland. Dudley accompanied him as second-in-command with a taste for personal combat. On one occasion he fought his way out of an ambush and, spear in hand, chased his Scottish counterpart for some 250 yards (230 m), nearly running him through. In the Battle of Pinkie Dudley led the vanguard, being "one of the key architects of the English victory".

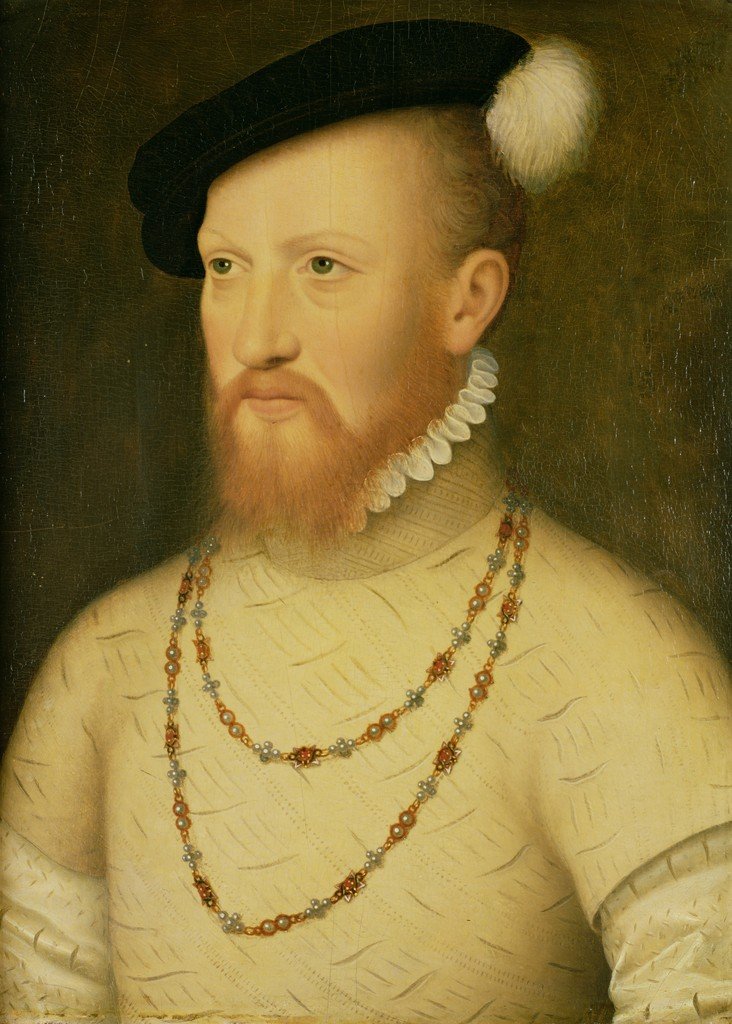
Edward Seymour, Duke of Somerset

The Protector's agrarian policy and proclamations were inspired by a group of intellectuals sometimes called "the commonwealth men". These were highly critical of landlords and left many commoners with the impression that enclosures were unlawful. As one of England's major landowners, Dudley soon feared that this would lead to serious trouble and discreetly tried to warn Somerset. By the summer of 1549 there was widespread unrest or even rebellion all over England. The Marquess of Northampton had been unable to restore order in and around Norwich, so John Dudley was sent to get hold of Kett's Rebellion. Dudley offered Robert Kett a pardon on the condition that the peasant army disband at once. This was rejected and the next night Dudley stormed the rebel-held city with a small mercenary contingent and drove the rebels out after fierce street fighting; 49 prisoners he had immediately hanged. Two days later Kett, who had his main camp outside the city, confronted the royal army, resulting in a slaughter of over 2,000 peasants. In the following weeks Dudley conducted courts-martial which executed many rebels, perhaps up to 300. For the enraged and humiliated local gentry this was still not enough punishment, so Dudley warned them: "Is there no place for pardon? ... What shall we then do? Shall we hold the plough ourselves, play the carters and labour the ground with our own hands?"

The Lord Protector, in his proclamations, appealed to the common people. To his colleagues, whom he hardly consulted, he displayed a distinctly autocratic and "increasingly contemptuous" face. By autumn 1549 the same councillors who had made him Protector were convinced that he had failed to exercise proper authority and was unwilling to listen to good counsel. Dudley still had the troops from the Norfolk campaign at his disposal, and in October 1549 he joined the Earl of Southampton and the Earl of Arundel, prominent religious conservatives, to lead a coup of councillors to oust the Protector from office. They withdrew from court to London, meeting in Dudley's residence. Starting with the Protector, each side issued proclamations accusing the other of treason and declared to act in defence of the King's safety. Somerset tried in vain to raise a popular force and entrenched himself with the King at the fortress Windsor Castle. Military force near King Edward's presence was unthinkable and, apparently, Dudley and Archbishop Thomas Cranmer brokered an unofficial deal with Somerset, who surrendered. To keep appearances, the 12-year-old King personally commanded his uncle's arrest. For a moment there was hope of a conservative restoration in some quarters. However, Dudley and Cranmer secured the Reformed agenda by persuading Edward to appoint additional Reformed-minded members to the Council and Privy Chamber. In December 1549 Southampton tried to regain predominance by charging Dudley with treason, alongside Somerset, for having been an original ally of the Protector. The scheme misfired when Dudley invited the council to his house and baffled the plotters by exclaiming, with his hand at his sword and "a warlike visage": "my lord, you seek his [Somerset's] blood and he that seeketh his blood would have mine also".

Dudley consolidated his power through institutional manoeuvres and by January 1550 was in effect the new regent. On 2 February 1550 he became Lord President of the Council, with the capacity to debar councillors from the body and appoint new ones. He excluded Southampton and other conservatives, but arranged Somerset's release and his return to the Privy Council and Privy Chamber. In June 1550 Dudley's heir John married Somerset's daughter Anne as a mark of reconciliation. Yet Somerset soon attracted political sympathizers and hoped to re-establish his power by removing Dudley from the scene, "contemplating", as he later admitted, the Lord President's arrest and execution. Relying on his popularity with the masses, he campaigned against and tried to obstruct Dudley's policies. His behaviour increasingly threatened the cohesion vital within a minority regime. In that respect Warwick would take no chances, and he now also aspired to a dukedom. He needed to advertise his power and impress his followers; like his predecessor, he had to represent the King's honour. His elevation as Duke of Northumberland came on 11 October 1551 with the Duke of Somerset participating in the ceremony. Five days later Somerset was arrested, while rumours about supposed plots of his circulated. He was accused of having planned a "banquet massacre", in which the council were to be assaulted and Dudley killed. Somerset was acquitted of treason, but convicted of felony for raising a contingent of armed men without a licence. He was executed on 22 January 1552. While technically lawful, these events contributed much to Northumberland's growing unpopularity. Dudley himself, according to a French eyewitness, confessed before his own end that "nothing had pressed so injuriously upon his conscience as the fraudulent scheme against the Duke of Somerset".

== Ruling England ==
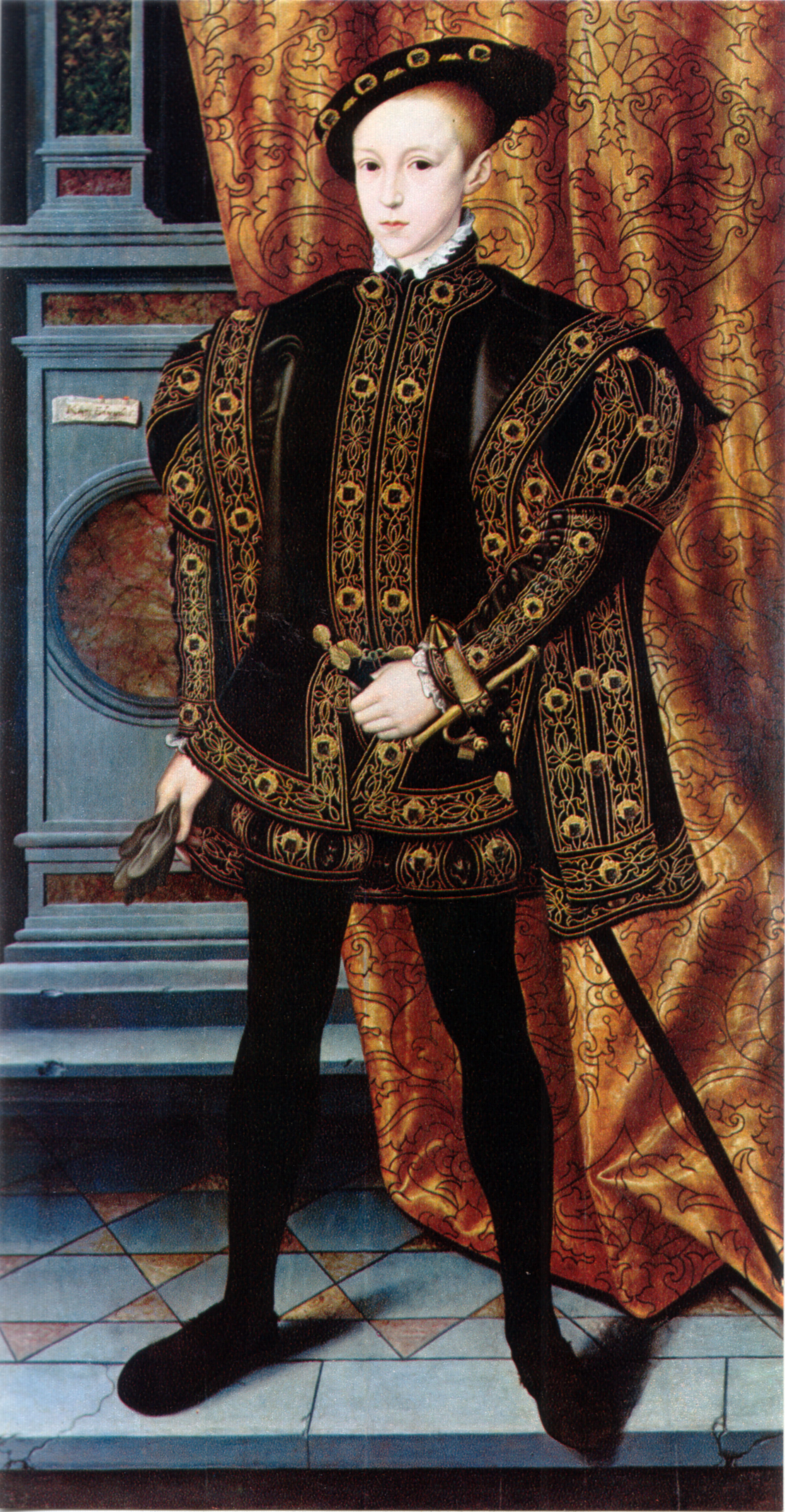
King Edward VI c. 1550

Instead of taking the title of Lord Protector, John Dudley set out to rule as primus inter pares, the working atmosphere being more conciliar and less autocratic than under Somerset. The new Lord President of the Council reshuffled some high offices, becoming Grand Master of the Household himself and giving Somerset's former office of Lord Treasurer to William Paulet, 1st Marquess of Winchester. The office of Grand Master entailed supervising the Royal Household, which gave Dudley the means to control the Privy Chamber and thus the King's surroundings. This was done via his "special friends" (as he called them), Sir John Gates and Lord Thomas Darcy. Dudley also placed his son-in-law Sir Henry Sidney and his brother Sir Andrew Dudley near the King. William Cecil was still in the Duke of Somerset's service when he gradually shifted his loyalty to John Dudley, who made him Secretary of State and thought him "a most faithful servant and by that term most witty [wise] councillor ... as was scarce like in this realm". In this position Cecil was Dudley's trusted right hand, who primed the Privy Council according to the Lord President's wishes. At the same time Cecil had intimate contact with the King because Edward worked closely with the secretaries of state.

Dudley organised Edward's political education so that he should take an interest in affairs and at least appear to influence decisions. He wanted the King to grow into his authority as smoothly as possible. Disruptive conflicts when Edward took over government could thus be minimised, while Dudley's chances to continue as principal minister would be good. From the age of about 14 Edward's signature on documents no longer needed the council's countersignatures, and the King was regularly debriefed in meetings with a Council of his own choosing—the principal administrators and the Duke of Northumberland were among the chosen. Dudley had a warm if respectful relationship with the teenager, who "loved and feared" him according to Jean Scheyfve, the Imperial ambassador. At a dinner Edward discussed with the envoy at length until Northumberland discreetly indicated to the King that he had said enough. Yet the Duke did not necessarily have his way in all things. In 1552–1553 the King's hand can be discerned behind decisions (and omissions) that directly contravened Dudley's wishes. At court, complex networks of influence were at work and Edward listened to more than one voice. Regarding the question to what extent Edward played a role in his own government, Stephen Alford writes:

It is possible to endorse Edward's developing grasp of the business of kingship and accept the still powerful political presence of John Dudley and his colleagues. The structures of ... the ... Council and the royal household began to adapt themselves to the implications of the king's age ... the dynamics of power at the centre were capable of reshaping themselves because the men around the king accepted that, in the circumstances, they should.

=== Social and economic policy ===
Dudley set out to restore administrative efficiency and maintain public order to prevent renewed rebellion as seen in 1549. Equipped with a new law "for the punishment of unlawful assemblies", he built a united front of landholders and Privy Council, the government intervening locally at any sign of unrest. He returned to the ancient practice of granting licences to retain liveried followers and installed lord-lieutenants that represented the central government and were to keep ready small bands of cavalry. These measures proved effective and the country was calm for the rest of the reign. In fact, in the summer of 1552—a year before the succession crisis—the cavalry bands were disbanded to save money.

John Dudley also strove to alleviate the social situation. The 1547 "Act for the Punishment of Vagabonds", which had enacted that any unemployed man found loitering was to be branded and given to the "presentor" as a slave, was abolished as too harsh in 1550. In 1552, Northumberland pushed a novel Poor Law through parliament which provided for weekly parish-based collections for the "relief of the poor". Parishes were to register their needy inhabitants as well as the amounts people agreed to give for them, while unwilling contributors were to be "induced" by the parson and, if need be, by the bishop. The years 1549–1551 saw poor harvests and, accordingly, soaring food prices. Dudley tried to intervene against the malpractices of middlemen by official searches for hidden corn and by fixing maximum prices for grain, meat, and other victuals. However, the set prices were so unrealistic that farmers stopped to sell their produce at the open market and the regulations had to be rescinded. The regime's agrarian policy, while giving landlords much freedom to enclose common land, also distinguished between different forms of enclosure. Landlords guilty of illegal enclosures were increasingly prosecuted.

The financial legacy of the Protectorate consisted, apart from crippling Crown debts, of an unprecedentedly debased coinage. On the second day as Lord President of the Council, Dudley began a process to tackle the problems of the mint. He set up a committee that looked into the peculation by the officers of the mint and other institutions. In 1551, the government at the same time tried to yield profit and restore confidence in the coin by issuing yet further debased coinage and "crying it down" immediately afterwards. The result was panic and confusion and, to get hold of the situation, a coin of 92.3% silver content (against 25% silver content in the last debasement) was issued within months. The bad coin prevailed over the good, however, because people had lost confidence. Northumberland admitted defeat and recruited the financial expert Thomas Gresham. After the first good harvest in four years, by late 1552 the currency was stable, prices for foodstuffs had dropped, and a basis for economic recovery had been laid. A process to centralise the administration of Crown revenue was underway and foreign debt had been eliminated.

=== Religious policy ===
The use of the Book of Common Prayer became law in 1549. King Edward's half-sister, Mary Tudor, de facto had licence to continue hearing mass in private. So soon as he was in power, Dudley put pressure on her to stop her from allowing her entire household and flocks of visitors to attend. Mary, who in her turn did not tolerate the Book of Common Prayer in any of her residences, was not prepared to make any concessions. She planned to flee the country but then could not make up her mind in the last minute. Mary denied Edward's personal interest in the issue and entirely blamed John Dudley for her troubles. After a meeting with King and Council, in which she was told that what mattered was not her faith but her disobedience to the law, she sent the Imperial ambassador Scheyfve to threaten war on England. The English government could not swallow a war threat from an ambassador who had stepped out of his commission, but at the same time would not risk all-important commercial ties with the Habsburg Netherlands, so an embassy was sent to Brussels and some of Mary's household officers were arrested. On his next visit to the council, Scheyfye was informed by the Earl of Warwick that the King of England had as much authority at 14 as he had at 40—Dudley was alluding to Mary's refusal to accept Edward's demands on grounds of his young age. In the end a silent compromise came into effect: Mary continued to hear mass in a more private manner, while augmenting her landed property by exchanges with the Crown.

Appealing to the King's religious tastes, John Dudley became the chief backer of evangelical Protestants among the clergy, promoting several to bishoprics—for example John Hooper and John Ponet. The English Reformation went on apace, despite its widespread unpopularity. The 1552 revised edition of the Book of Common Prayer rejected the doctrine of transubstantiation, and the Forty-two Articles, issued in June 1553, proclaimed justification by faith and denied the existence of purgatory. Despite these being cherished projects of Archbishop Thomas Cranmer, he was displeased with the way the government handled their issue. By 1552 the relationship between the primate and the Duke was icy. To prevent the Church from becoming independent of the state, Dudley was against Cranmer's reform of canon law. He recruited the Scot John Knox so that he should, in Northumberland's words, "be a whetstone to quicken and sharp the Bishop of Canterbury, whereof he hath need". Knox refused to collaborate, but joined fellow reformers in a concerted preaching campaign against covetous men in high places. Cranmer's canon law was finally wrecked by Northumberland's furious intervention during the spring parliament of 1553. On a personal level, though, the Duke was happy to help produce a schoolchildren's catechism in Latin and English. In June 1553 he backed the Privy Council's invitation of Philip Melanchthon to become Regius Professor of Divinity at Cambridge University. But for the King's death, Melanchthon would have come to England—his high travel costs had already been granted by Edward's government.

At the heart of Northumberland's problems with the episcopate lay the issue of the Church's wealth, from the confiscation of which the government and its officials had profited ever since the Dissolution of the Monasteries. The most radical preachers thought that bishops, if needed at all, should be "unlorded". This attitude was attractive to Dudley, as it conveniently allowed him to fill up the Exchequer or distribute rewards with Church property. When new bishops were appointed—typically to the sees of deprived conservative incumbents—they often had to surrender substantial land holdings to the Crown and were left with a much reduced income. The dire situation of the Crown finances made the Council resort to a further wave of Church expropriation in 1552–1553, targeting chantry lands and Church plate. At the time and since, the break-up and reorganisation of the Prince-Bishopric of Durham has been interpreted as Dudley's attempt to create himself a county palatine of his own. However, as it turned out, Durham's entire revenue was allotted to the two successor bishoprics and the nearby border garrison of Norham Castle. Dudley received the stewardship of the new "King's County Palatine" in the North (worth £50 p.a.), but there was no further gain for him. Overall, Northumberland's provisions for reorganised dioceses reveal a concern in him that "the preaching of the gospel" should not lack funds. Still, the confiscation of Church property as well as the lay government's direction of Church affairs made the Duke disliked among clerics, whether Reformed or conservative. His relations with them were never worse than when the crisis of Edward's final illness approached.

=== Peace policy ===
The war policy 1547–1549 had entailed an extraordinary expenditure of about £350,000 p.a. against a regular Crown income of £150,000 p.a. It was impossible to continue in this way, and Dudley quickly negotiated a withdrawal of the besieged English garrison at Boulogne. The high costs of the garrison could thus be saved and French payments of redemption of roughly £180,000 were a most welcome cash income. The peace with France was concluded in the Treaty of Boulogne in March 1550. There was both public rejoicing and anger at the time, and some historians have condemned the peace as a shameful surrender of English-held territory. A year later it was agreed that King Edward was to have a French bride, the six-year-old Elisabeth of Valois. The threat of war with Scotland was also neutralised, England giving up some isolated garrisons in exchange. In the peace treaty with Scotland of June 1551, a joint commission, one of the first of its kind in history, was installed to agree upon the exact boundary between the two countries. This matter was concluded in August 1552 by French arbitration. Despite the cessation of hostilities, English defences were kept on a high level: nearly £200,000 p.a. were spent on the navy and the garrisons at Calais and on the Scottish border. In his capacity as Warden-General of the Scottish Marches, Northumberland arranged for the building of a new Italianate fortress at Berwick-upon-Tweed.

The war between France and the Emperor broke out once again in September 1551. In due course Northumberland rejected requests for English help from both sides, which in the case of the Empire consisted of a demand for full-scale war based on an Anglo-Imperial treaty of 1542. The Duke pursued a policy of neutrality, a balancing act that made peace between the two great powers attractive. In late 1552, he undertook to bring about a European peace by English mediation. These moves were taken seriously by the rival resident ambassadors, but were ended in June 1553 by the belligerents, the continuance of war being more advantageous to them.

=== Overseas interest ===
John Dudley recovered the post of Lord Admiral immediately after the Protector's fall in October 1549, Thomas Seymour having been executed by his brother in March 1549. Dudley passed on the office to Edward, Lord Clinton, in May 1550, yet never lost his keen interest in maritime affairs. Henry VIII had revolutionised the English navy, mainly in military terms. Dudley encouraged English voyages to far-off coasts, ignoring Spanish threats. He even contemplated a raid on Peru with Sebastian Cabot in 1551. Expeditions to Morocco and the Guinea coast in 1551 and 1552 were actually realised. A planned voyage to China via the Northeast Passage under Hugh Willoughby sailed in May 1553. King Edward watched their departure from his window. Northumberland was at the centre of a "maritime revolution", a policy in which, increasingly, the English Crown sponsored long-distance trade directly.

== Succession crisis of 1553 ==
=== Changing the succession ===
The 15-year-old King fell seriously ill in February 1553. His sister Mary was invited to visit him, the Council doing "duty and obeisance to her as if she had been Queen of England". The King recovered somewhat, and in April Northumberland restored Mary's full title and arms as Princess of England, which she had lost in the 1530s. He also kept her informed about Edward's condition. About this time a set of drawn-out marriage negotiations came to conclusion. On 21 May 1553 Guildford Dudley, Northumberland's second youngest son, married Lady Jane Grey, the fervently Protestant daughter of the Duke of Suffolk and, through her mother Frances Brandon, niece of Henry VIII. Her sister Catherine was matched with the heir of the Earl of Pembroke, and another Katherine, Guildford's younger sister, was promised to Henry Hastings, heir of the Earl of Huntingdon. Within a month the first of these marriages turned out to be highly significant. Although marked by magnificent festivities, at the time they took place the alliances were not seen as politically important, not even by the Imperial ambassador Scheyfye, who was the most suspicious observer. Often perceived as proof of a conspiracy to bring the Dudley family to the throne, they have also been described as routine matches between aristocrats.

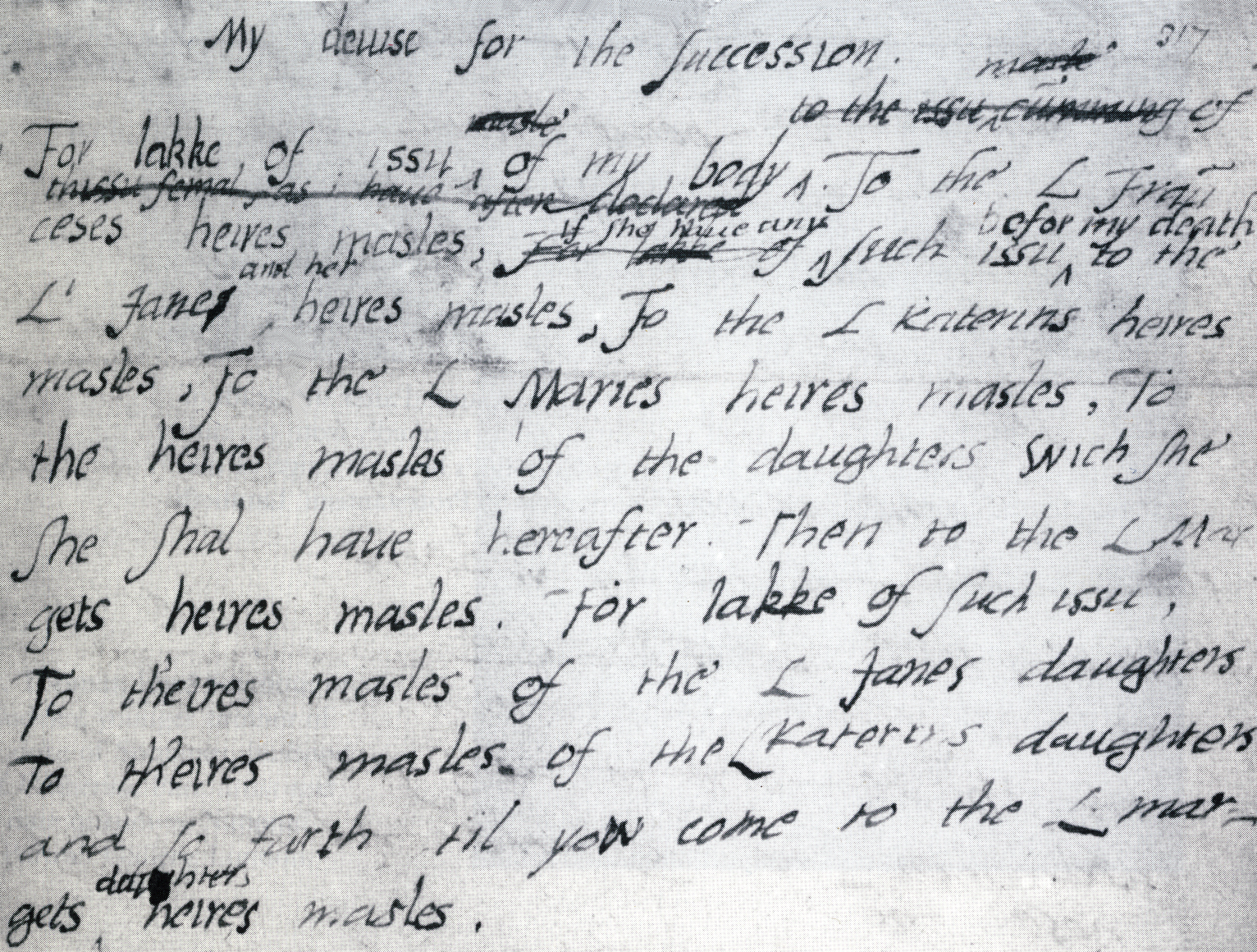
"My devise for the Succession" by Edward VI. Edward changed his text from "L Janes heires masles" to "L Jane and her heires masles".

At some point during his illness Edward wrote a draft document headed "My devise for the Succession". Due to his ardent Protestantism Edward did not want his Catholic sister Mary to succeed, but he was also preoccupied with male succession and with legitimacy, which in Mary's and Elizabeth's case was questionable as a result of Henry VIII's legislation. (Note: Henry VIII, in his Third Succession Act of 1544 and in his will, nominated his daughters Mary and Elizabeth as successors to the Crown, "upon condition" that they did not marry without the consent of the Privy Council (Hutchinson 2006 p. 212). In the same 1544 act his daughters were still, as in earlier legislation, declared illegitimate and unable to inherit by common law (Ives 2009 p. 143).) In the first version of his "devise", written before he knew he was mortally ill, Edward bypassed his half-sisters and provided for the succession of male heirs only. (Note: If there were no male heirs at the time of his death, England should have no king until the birth of a male royal child; a detailed system of female regency provisions was to apply in this case. Edward also distinguished between different types of minority rule and envisaged the possibility of having adult sons to succeed him (Ives 2009 pp. 137–139; Alford 2002 pp. 172–173).) Around the end of May or early June Edward's condition worsened dramatically and he corrected his draft such that Lady Jane Grey herself, not just her putative sons, could inherit the Crown. To what extent Edward's document—especially this last change—was influenced by Northumberland, his confidant John Gates, or still other members of the Privy Chamber like Edward's tutor John Cheke or Secretary William Petre, is unclear.

Edward fully endorsed it. He personally supervised the copying of his will and twice summoned lawyers to his bedside to give them orders. On the second occasion, 15 June, Northumberland kept a watchful eye over the proceedings. Days before, the Duke had intimidated the judges who were raising legal objections to the "devise". The next step was an engagement to perform the King's will after his death, signed in his presence by Northumberland and 23 others. Finally, the King's official "declaration", issued as letters patent, was signed by 102 notables, among them the whole Privy Council, peers, bishops, judges, and London aldermen. Edward also announced to have it passed in parliament in September, and the necessary writs were prepared.

It was now common knowledge that Edward was dying. The Imperial ambassador, Scheyfye, had been convinced for years that Dudley was engaged in some "mighty plot" to settle the Crown on his own head. As late as 12 June, though, he still knew nothing specific, despite having inside information about Edward's sickness. France, which found the prospect of the Emperor's cousin on the English throne disagreeable, gave indications of support to Northumberland. Since the Duke did not rule out an armed intervention from Charles V, he came back on the French offer after the King's death, sending a secret and non-committal mission to King Henry II. After Jane's accession in July the ambassadors of both powers were convinced she would prevail, although they were in no doubt that the common people backed Mary. Antoine de Noailles wrote of Guildford Dudley as "the new King", while the Emperor instructed his envoys to arrange themselves with the Duke and to discourage Mary from undertaking anything dangerous.

Whether altering the succession was Edward's own idea or not, he was determinedly at work to exclude his half-sisters in favour of what he perceived as his jeopardised legacy. The original provisions of the "devise" have been described as bizarre and obsessive and as typical of a teenager, while incompatible with the mind and needs of a pragmatical politician. Mary's accession could cost Northumberland his head, but not necessarily so. He tried hard to please her during 1553, and may have shared the general assumption that she would succeed to the Crown as late as early June. Faced with Edward's express royal will and perseverance, John Dudley submitted to his master's wishes—either seeing his chance to retain his power beyond the boy's lifetime or out of loyalty.

=== Downfall ===
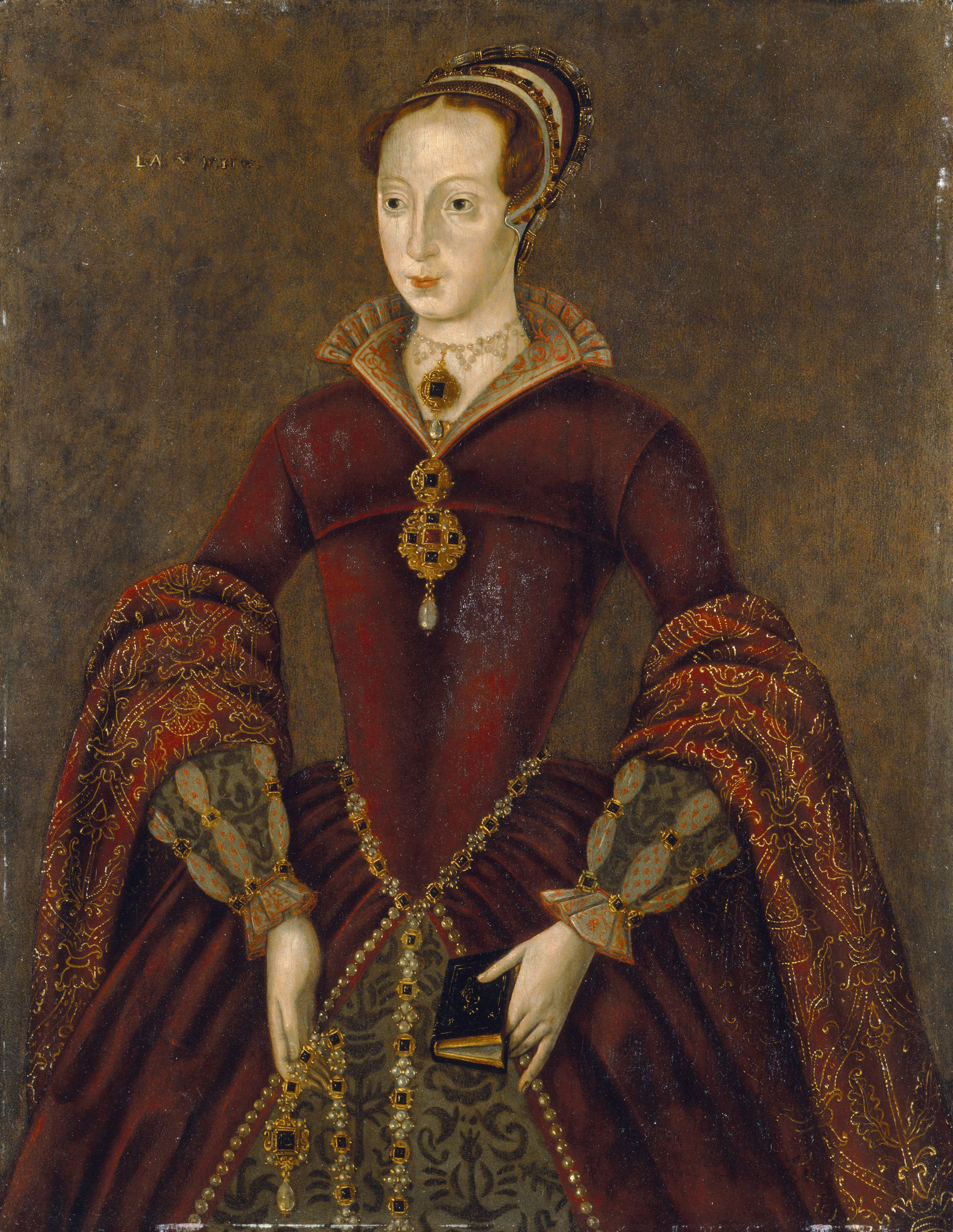
Lady Jane Grey, whom Northumberland put on the English throne; he reminded his colleagues that "this virtuous lady ... by ... our enticement is rather of force placed therein than by her own seeking and request."

Edward VI died on 6 July 1553. The next morning Northumberland sent his son Robert into Hertfordshire with 300 men to secure the person of Mary Tudor. Aware of her half-brother's condition, the Princess had only days before moved to East Anglia, where she was the greatest landowner. She began to assemble an armed following and sent a letter to the council, demanding to be recognised as queen. Her servant, Thomas Hungate, arrived with the letter on 10 July, the day Jane Grey was proclaimed as queen. The Duke of Northumberland's oration, held before Jane the previous day, did not move her to accept the Crown—her parents' assistance was required for that. Dudley had not prepared for resolute action on Mary's part and needed a week to build up a larger force. He was in a dilemma over who should lead the troops. He was the most experienced general in the kingdom, but he did not want to leave the government in the hands of his colleagues, in some of whom he had little confidence. Queen Jane decided the issue by demanding that her father, the Duke of Suffolk, should remain with her and the council. On 14 July Northumberland headed for Cambridge with 1,500 troops and some artillery, having reminded his colleagues of the gravity of the cause, "what chance of variance soever might grow amongst you in my absence".

Supported by gentry and nobility in East Anglia and the Thames Valley, Mary's military camp was gathering strength daily and, through luck, came into possession of powerful artillery from the royal navy. In the circumstances the Duke deemed fighting a hopeless campaign. The army proceeded from Cambridge to Bury St Edmunds and retreated again to Cambridge. On 20 July a letter from the Council in London arrived, declaring that they had proclaimed Mary Queen and commanding Northumberland to disband the army and await events. Dudley did not contemplate resistance. (Note: It was said that "his men forsook him", as the London chronicler Henry Machyn put it (Loades 2004 p. 127). Such rumours and claims were largely exaggerated, though (Ives 2009 pp. 203–205; Loades 2004 p. 127). The bulk of the troops he had brought from London were with the Duke until the end and, in the words of David Loades, "he could have made a considerable nuisance of himself if he had chosen."(Loades 2004 p. 127).) He explained to his fellow-commanders that they had acted on the council's orders all the time and that he did not now wish "to combat the Council's decisions, supposing that they have been moved by good reasons ... and I beg your lordships to do the same." Proclaiming Mary Tudor at the market place, he threw up his cap and "so laughed that the tears ran down his cheeks for grief." The next morning the Earl of Arundel arrived to arrest him. A week earlier Arundel had assured Northumberland of his wish to spill his blood even at the Duke's feet; now Dudley went down on his knees as soon as he caught sight of him.

Northumberland rode through the City of London to the Tower on 25 July, with his guards struggling to protect him against the hostile populace. A pamphlet appearing shortly after his arrest illustrated the general hatred of him: "the great devil Dudley ruleth, Duke I should have said". He was now commonly thought to have poisoned King Edward while Mary "would have been as glad of her brother's life, as the ragged bear is glad of his death". Dumbfounded by the turn of events, the French ambassador Noailles wrote: "I have witnessed the most sudden change believable in men, and I believe that God alone worked it." David Loades, biographer of both Queen Mary and John Dudley, concludes that the lack of fighting clouds the fact that this outcome was a close-run affair, and warns

to explain Mary's triumph over Jane simply in terms of overwhelming spontaneous support. Northumberland ... was completely unprepared for the crisis which eventually overtook him. He was already losing his grip upon the situation before the council defected, and that was why they did it.

=== Trial and execution ===
Northumberland was tried on 18 August 1553 in Westminster Hall. The panels of the jury and judges were largely made up of his former colleagues. Dudley hinted that he had acted on the authority of Prince and Council and by warrant of the Great Seal. Answered that the Great Seal of a usurper was worth nothing, he asked "whether any such persons as were equally culpable of that crime ... might be his judges". After his sentence was passed, of which he was tried with high treason, he begged the Queen's mercy for his five sons, the eldest of whom was condemned with him, the rest waiting for their trials. (Note: John, Ambrose, Robert, Henry, and Guildford Dudley were all condemned to death, as was Sir Andrew Dudley, Northumberland's brother. Only Guildford was executed, in February 1554, with his wife Lady Jane Grey. The only other people who died were Sir John Gates and Sir Thomas Palmer, on the same day as the Duke (Loades 1996 pp. 270, 271).) He also asked to "confess to a learned divine" and was visited by Bishop Stephen Gardiner, who had passed most of Edward's reign in the Tower and was now Mary's Lord Chancellor. The Duke's execution was planned for 21 August at eight in the morning; however, it was suddenly cancelled. Northumberland was instead escorted to St Peter ad Vincula, where he took the Catholic communion and professed that "the plagues that is upon the realm and upon us now is that we have erred from the faith these sixteen years." A great propaganda coup for the new government, Dudley's words were officially distributed—especially in the territories of the Emperor Charles V. In the evening the Duke learnt "that I must prepare myself against tomorrow to receive my deadly stroke", as he wrote in a desperate plea to the Earl of Arundel: "O my good lord remember how sweet life is, and how bitter ye contrary." On the scaffold, before 10,000 people, Dudley confessed his guilt but maintained:

"And yet this act wherefore I die, was not altogether of me (as it is thought) but I was procured and induced thereunto by other[s]. I was I say induced thereunto by other[s], howbeit, God forbid that I should name any man unto you, I will name no man unto you, and therefore I beseech you look not for it. ... And one thing more good people I have to say unto you ... and that is to warn you and exhort you to beware of these seditious preachers, and teachers of new doctrine, which pretend to preach God's word, but in very deed they preach their own fancies, ... they know not today what they would have tomorrow, ... they open the book, but they cannot shut it again. ... I could good people rehearse much more ... but you know I have another thing to do, whereunto I must prepare me, for the time draweth away." ... And after he had thus spoken he kneeled down ... and bowing toward the block he said, I have deserved a thousand deaths, and thereupon he made a cross upon the straw, and kissed it, and laid his head upon the block, and so died.

== Assessments ==
=== Historical reputation ===
A black legend about the Duke of Northumberland was already in the making when he was still in power, the more after his fall. From the last days of Henry VIII he was to have planned, years in advance, the destruction of both King Edward's Seymour uncles—Lord Thomas and the Protector—as well as Edward himself. He also served as an indispensable scapegoat: It was the most practical thing for Queen Mary to believe that Dudley had been acting all alone and it was in nobody's interest to doubt it. Further questions were unwelcome, as Charles V's ambassadors found out: "it was thought best not to inquire too closely into what had happened, so as to make no discoveries that might prejudice those [who tried the duke]". By renouncing the Protestantism he had so conspicuously stood for, Northumberland lost every respect and became ineligible for rehabilitation in a world dominated by thinking along sectarian lines. Protestant writers like John Foxe and John Ponet concentrated on the pious King Edward's achievements and reinvented Somerset as the "good Duke"—it followed that there had also to be a "wicked Duke". This interpretation was enhanced by the High and Late Victorian historians, James Anthony Froude and A. F. Pollard, who saw Somerset as a champion of political liberty whose desire "to do good" was thwarted by, in Pollard's phrase, "the subtlest intriguer in English History".

As late as 1968/1970, W. K. Jordan embraced this good duke/bad duke dichotomy in a two-volume study of Edward VI's reign. However, he saw the King on the verge of assuming full authority at the beginning of 1553 (with Dudley contemplating retirement) and ascribed the succession alteration to Edward's resolution, Northumberland playing the part of the loyal and tragic enforcer instead of the original instigator. Many historians have since seen the "devise" as Edward's very own project. (Note: For example: Stephen Alford (Alford 2002 pp. 171–174); Dale Hoak (Hoak 2004); Eric Ives (Ives 2009 pp. 136–142, 145–148); David Loades (Loades 1996 pp. 231–233, 239–241; Loades 2003 pp. 79–80; Loades 2004 pp. 68–69, 121–123; Loades 2008); Diarmaid MacCulloch (MacCulloch 2001 pp. 39–41); Linda Porter (Porter 2007 p. 188); Judith Richards (Richards 2007); Chris Skidmore (Skidmore 2007 pp. 247–250); David Starkey (Starkey 2001 pp. 112–114); Derek Wilson (Wilson 2005 pp. 215–221).) Others, while remarking upon the plan's sloppy implementation, have seen Northumberland as behind the scheme, yet in concord with Edward's convictions; the Duke acting out of despair for his own survival, or to rescue political and religious reform and save England from Habsburg domination.

Since the 1970s, critical reassessments of the Duke of Somerset's policies and government style led to acknowledgment that Northumberland revitalised and reformed the Privy Council as a central part of the administration, and that he "took the necessary but unpopular steps to hold the minority regime together". Stability and reconstruction have been made out as the mark of most of his policies; the scale of his motivation ranging from "determined ambition" with G. R. Elton in 1977 to "idealism of a sort" with Diarmaid MacCulloch in 1999. Dale Hoak concluded in 1980: "given the circumstances which he inherited in 1549, the duke of Northumberland appears to have been one of the most remarkably able governors of any European state during the sixteenth century."

=== Personality ===
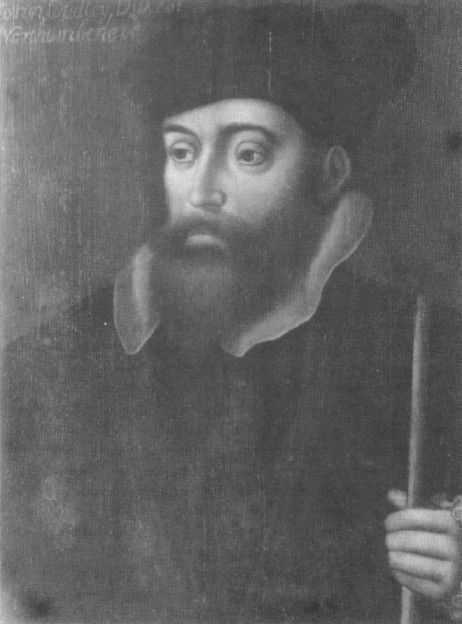
John Dudley, 1540s, with wand of office

John Dudley's recantation of his Protestant faith before his execution delighted Queen Mary and enraged Lady Jane. The general opinion, especially among Protestants, was that he tried to seek a pardon by this move. Historians have often believed that he had no faith whatsoever, being a mere cynic. Further explanations—both contemporary and modern—have been that Northumberland sought to rescue his family from the axe, that, in the face of catastrophe, he found a spiritual home in the church of his childhood, or that he saw the hand of God in Mary's success. Although he endorsed the Reformation from at least the mid-1530s, Dudley may not have understood theological subtleties, being a "simple man in such matters". The Duke was stung by an outspoken letter he received from John Knox, whom he had invited to preach before the King and in vain had offered a bishopric. William Cecil was informed:

I love not to have to do with men which be neither grateful nor pleasable. I assure you I mind to have no more to do with him but to wish him well ... he cannot tell whether I be a dissembler in religion or not ... for my own part, if I should have passed more upon the speech of the people than upon the service of my master ... I needed not to have had so much obloquy of some kind of men; but the living God, that knoweth the hearts of all men, shall be my judge at the last day with what zeal, faith, and truth I serve my master.

Northumberland was not an old-style peer, despite his aristocratic ancestry and existence as a great lord. He acquired, sold, and exchanged lands, but never strove to build himself a territorial power base or a large armed force of retainers (which proved fatal in the end). His maximum income of £4,300 p.a. from land and a £2,000 p.a. from annuities and fees, was appropriate to his rank and figured well below the annuity of £5,333 p.a. the Duke of Somerset had granted himself, thus reaching an income of over £10,000 p.a. while in office. John Dudley was a typical Tudor Crown servant, self-interested but absolutely loyal to the incumbent sovereign: The monarch's every wish was law. This uncritical stance may have played a decisive role in Northumberland's decision to implement Edward's succession device, as it did in his attitude towards Mary when she had become queen. The fear his services could be inadequate or go unacknowledged by the monarch was constant in Dudley, who also was very sensitive on what he called "estimation", meaning status. Edmund Dudley was unforgotten: "my poor father's fate who, after his master was gone, suffered death for doing his master's commandments", the Duke wrote to Cecil nine months before his own end.

John Dudley was an imposing figure with a strong temperament who could also charm people with his courtesy and a graceful presence. He was a family man, an understanding father and husband who was passionately loved by his wife. Frequent phases of illness, partly due to a stomach ailment, occasioned long absences from court but did not reduce his high output of paperwork, and may have had an element of hypochondria in them. The English diplomat Richard Morrison wrote of his onetime superior: "This Earl had such a head that he seldom went about anything but he had three or four purposes beforehand." A French eyewitness of 1553 described him as "an intelligent man who could explain his ideas and who displayed an impressive dignity. Others, who did not know him, would have considered him worthy of a kingdom."

== See also ==
- Attainder of Duke of Northumberland and others Act 1553
- Cultural depictions of Lady Jane Grey

== Notes ==
Political offices
Preceded by The Earl of Hertford	Lord High Admiral; 1543–1547	Succeeded by The Lord Seymour of Sudeley
Preceded by The Lord Seymour of Sudeley	Lord High Admiral; 1549–1550	Succeeded by The Lord Clinton
Preceded by The Duke of Somerset	Lord Great Chamberlain; 1547–1550	Succeeded by The Marquess of Northampton
Preceded by The Duke of Somerset	Earl Marshal; 1551–1553	Succeeded by The Duke of Norfolk
Preceded by The Lord St John	Grand Master of the Household; 1550–1553	Succeeded by The Earl of Arundel
Preceded by The Lord St John	Lord President of the Council; 1550–1553	Succeeded by The Earl of Arundel
Preceded by The Earl of Rutland	Lord Warden of the Scottish Marches; 1542–1543	Succeeded by The Lord Parr
Preceded by Richard Sampson	President of the Council in the Marches; 1548–1550	Succeeded by Sir William Herbert
Military offices
Preceded by Sir Edward Guildford	Master of the Tower Armoury; 1535–1544	Succeeded by Sir Thomas Darcy
Vacant	Governor of Boulogne; 1544–1545	Succeeded by The Lord Poynings
Academic offices
Preceded by The Duke of Somerset	Chancellor of the University of Cambridge; 1552–1553	Succeeded by The Bishop of Winchester
Peerage of England
New creation	Earl of Warwick; 2nd creation 1547–1553	Succeeded by John Dudley
