= Offington =

Area of Worthing, West Sussex, England

Coordinates: 50.83382°N 0.38886°W

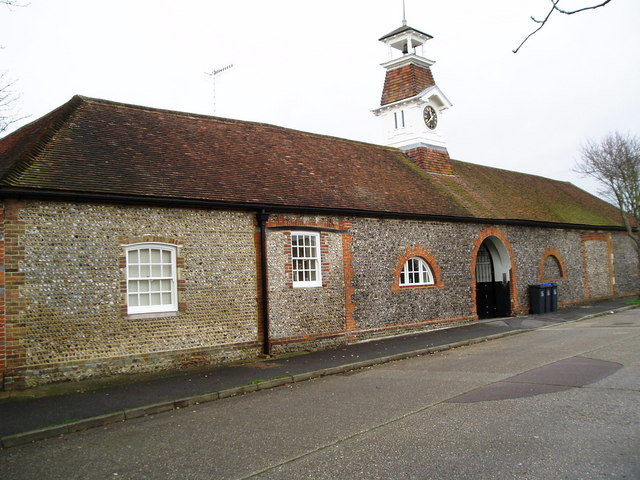
- Stable Mews, one of the remaining parts of Offington Hall

- Location within West Sussex
- Population: 7,719 (2011.Ward)
- OS grid reference: TQ135050
- District: Worthing
- Shire county: West Sussex
- Region: South East
- Country: England
- Sovereign state: United Kingdom
- Post town: WORTHING
- Postcode district: BN14 0
- Dialling code: 01903
- Police: Sussex
- Fire: West Sussex
- Ambulance: South East Coast
- UK Parliament: East Worthing and Shoreham

Offington is a neighbourhood of Worthing, and a ward in the borough of Worthing in West Sussex, England. It lies on the A2031 road 1.6 miles (2.5 km) northwest of the town centre.

Today, the area is a residential suburb of Worthing. Offington was part of the parish of Broadwater and became part of the borough of Worthing in 1902. It is possibly best known for its large manor house, which survived from medieval times to the 1960s

== Etymology ==
Offington means Offa's farmstead. Offington's name is of Old English origin. The name 'Offa' would have been relatively common in the Saxon era and there is no evidence to suggest that the name is derived from King Offa of Mercia, although it is possible that Offa took control over the Kingdom of Sussex in the eighth century. In 1086, the Domesday Book the settlement was recorded as Ofintune in the ancient hundred of Steyning in the Rape of Bramber.

== History ==
In the mid-eleventh century, Offington was held by Godwin, Earl of Wessex. Following the successful Norman invasion of 1066, Offington, along with neighbouring settlements continued as part of the rape of Bramber.

Offington Manor House was apparently recorded in 1357. By the mid 15th century there was a large complex of buildings including at least one courtyard, a chapel, a guest-house, and a gate-house. Offington was home to Thomas West, 8th Baron De La Warr and his son Thomas West, 9th Baron De La Warr. The 8th Baron West was also buried in Broadwater's Parish Church. In the 1850s, Thomas Gaisford extended the house further, including a new library and a chapel. The chapel became Worthing's chief place of Roman Catholic worship until the building of Worthing first Catholic church, St Mary of the Angels.

There is a local legend that a tunnel containing buried treasure led from Offington House to the ancient hill fort of Cissbury to the north and was protected by a serpent.

The former outbuilding of Offington Manor, the Old Brewhouse in Hall Close is grade II listed. Said to date from 1150, the present structure is probably mainly 16th-17th century. Also the 18th century former stables of Offington Hall remain and are grade II listed. They were known as Offington Hall Riding School in Hall Avenue but have now been converted into living accommodation and are owned by the Offington Park Club.
