= Richard Southwell alias Darcy =

16th-century English politician

Richard Southwell alias Darcy (by 1531 – June 1600) was an English politician.

He was a member (MP) of the parliament of England for Gatton in March 1553.
