= John Tingleden =

16th-century English politician

John Tingleden or Dingleden (by 1520 – 1551) was an English politician.

He was a member (MP) of the parliament of England for Gatton in 1547.
