= Sir Thomas Copley =

English Roman Catholic politician

Sir Thomas Copley (1534–1584) was a prominent English Roman Catholic politician and exile of the reign of Elizabeth I. Knighted, perhaps by the king of France, and ennobled by Philip II of Spain, he was often known by contemporaries as "Lord Copley".

== Life ==
He was the eldest son of Sir Roger Copley by his wife Elizabeth, daughter of Sir William Shelley of Michelgrove, judge of the common pleas, and was one of the coheirs of Thomas Hoo, Baron Hoo and Hastings, whose title he claimed and sometimes assumed. Lord Hoo's daughter Jane married his great-grandfather, Sir Roger Copley. Another daughter married Sir Geoffrey Boleyn, and was the great-grandmother of Anne Boleyn. Sir Thomas was of Gatton, Surrey, and Roughay, Sussex, and of The Maze, Southwark.

The Lords of the Manor at Gatton then, as for nearly three centuries afterwards, returned the members of parliament for the borough of Gatton, and in 1554 Copley, when only twenty years of age, was returned 'by the election of Dame Elizabeth Copley' (his mother) as M.P. for Gatton. He sat for the same place in the later parliaments of 1556, 1557, 1559, and 1563, and distinguished himself in 1558 by his opposition to the government of Philip and Mary. He was then a Protestant, and was much in favour with his kinswoman Queen Elizabeth at the beginning of her reign. In 1560 she was godmother to his eldest son Henry.

According to Robert Parsons, in Relation of a Trial between the Bishop of Evreux and the Lord Plessis Mornay (1604), falsehoods he found in John Jewel's Apology (1562) led to Copley's conversion to Roman Catholicism. After suffering imprisonment as a recusant, he left England without license in or about 1570, and spent the rest of his life in France, Spain, and the Low Countries. He was in constant correspondence with William Cecil and other ministers, and sometimes with the queen herself, desiring pardon and permission to return to England and to enjoy his estates; but at the same time he was acting as the leader of the English expatriate Catholics, and sometimes was in the service of the king of Spain, from whom he had a pension, and by whom he was created baron of Gatton and grand master of the Maze. He also received letters of marque against the Dutch. He died in Flanders in 1584, and in the last codicil to his will styled himself "Sir Thomas Copley, knight, Lord Copley of Gatton in the county of Surrey".

== Family ==
By his wife Catherine, daughter and coheiress of Sir John Luttrell of Dunster, Somerset, he had four sons and four daughters:

- Henry Copley, Queen Elizabeth's godson, died young
- William Copley, succeeded at Gatton Manor to Lord of the Manor and had children, including:
  - Thomas Copley (1596–1652?), the eldest son of William Copley, recusant Jesuit who took an active part in the foundation of the colony of Maryland.
- Anthony Copley poet, known for his allegory, A Fig for Fortune.
- John Copley (1577–1662), youngest son, born at Leuven, became a Catholic priest, but in 1611 converted to Anglicanism.
- Margaret Copley married John Gage, lord of Burstow Manor, Surrey leaving no issue.
