= List of people from Littlehampton =

Littlehampton, is a seaside resort town and civil parish in the Arun District of West Sussex, England, on the east bank at the mouth of the River Arun. The following is a list of those people who were either born or live in Littlehampton, or had some important contribution to make to the town.

Table of contents:

A B C D E F G H I J K L M N O P Q R S T U V W X Y Z

== A ==
- Eluned Allen-Williams (1916–1989), Girl Guide executive and JP; born in Littlehampton
- George K. Arthur (1899–1985), actor and producer, produced The Bespoke Overcoat, winner of the 1956 Academy Award for Best Short Film

== B ==
- Ronnie Barker (1929–2005), actor, comedian and writer; lived on South Terrace, Littlehampton
- Paul Bence (1948–2024), former professional footballer for Brentford FC; born in Littlehampton
- John Bigham, 1st Viscount Mersey (1840–1929), jurist and politician; died in Littlehampton

== C ==
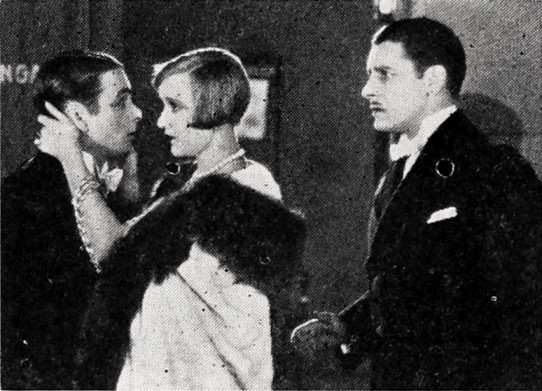
George K. Arthur and Ronald Colman in Her Sister from Paris (1925)

- Mary Chater, music advisor to the Girl Guides 1949–1961, editor of 15 songbooks
- Ronald Colman (1891–1958), actor, winner of the Academy Award and Golden Globe Award for Best Actor in 1947 for the film A Double Life, attended Hadleigh House School in Littlehampton from ca. 1901–1907; returned to Littlehampton on 30 June 1913 with the vaudeville troupe The Popinjays for a performance at the Kursaal

== D ==
- Anne Dalgarno (1909–1980), politician, nurse and community leader; attended the Convent of the Holy Family, Littlehampton
- Delirious?, Christian rock band formed in Littlehampton; active 1992–2009

== F ==
- Ian Fleming (1908–1964), author, journalist and naval intelligence officer, helped found No. 30 Commando unit, which was based in Littlehampton in 1944

== G ==
- Nick Gibb (1960–), politician, Member of Parliament (MP) for Bognor Regis and Littlehampton; first elected to the seat in 1997 and remained MP until stepping down in 2024
- Will Green (1973–), rugby union footballer who played at prop for Wasps and Leinster; born in Littlehampton

== H ==
- Cicely Hale (1884–1981), suffragette, health visitor, author; a plaque is dedicated to her in Marina Gardens, Littlehampton
- Michael Harbottle (1917–1997), Army officer, cricketer and peace campaigner; born in Littlehampton
- Edwin Harris (1891–1961), cricketer for Sussex County Cricket Club; born in Littlehampton
- Stanley Holloway (1890–1982), actor, died in Littlehampton
- Amelia Frances Howard-Gibbon (1826–1874), children's book illustrator; born in Littlehampton

== J ==
- Robert James (–1944), Army officer; born in Norfolk Road, Littlehampton

== L ==
- Joan Mary Last (1908–2002), music educator, author and composer; born in Littlehampton

== M ==
- Alan Minter (1951–2020), former world middleweight boxing champion, lived in Littlehampton in his later years

== N ==
- Mary Neal (1860–1944), folk dance revivalist, suffragist and social worker; lived in Littlehampton 1925–1940

== O ==
- Paul O'Grady (1955–2023), comedian, television presenter, actor, writer and radio DJ lived in Littlehampton for a time

== Q ==
- Jeffrey Quill (1913–1996), aviator and test pilot; born in Littlehampton

== R ==
- Frederick Ravenhill (1837–1897), cricketer for Sussex County Cricket Club; born in Littlehampton
- Albert Reed (1846–1931), cricketer for Sussex County Cricket Club; died in Littlehampton
- Anita Roddick (1942–2007), founder of The Body Shop; born in Littlehampton and established the Body Shop headquarters in the town
- Francis Rowe (1864–1928), cricketer for Essex County Cricket Club; died in Littlehampton

== S ==
- John A. Scott (1948–), English-Australian poet, novelist and academic; born in Littlehampton

== T ==
- Paul Tanqueray (1905–1991), photographer; born in Littlehampton

== See also ==
- List of people from Sussex
