= List of people from Sussex =

Flag of Sussex

Location of Sussex on map of the historic counties of England

This is a list of people from Sussex, a historic county in southern England. The following are people who were either born, brought up or have lived for a significant period of time in Sussex, or for whom Sussex is a significant part of their identity. Only those meeting notability criteria are included. A few people appear in more than one section of the list.

== Arts ==
=== Actors ===
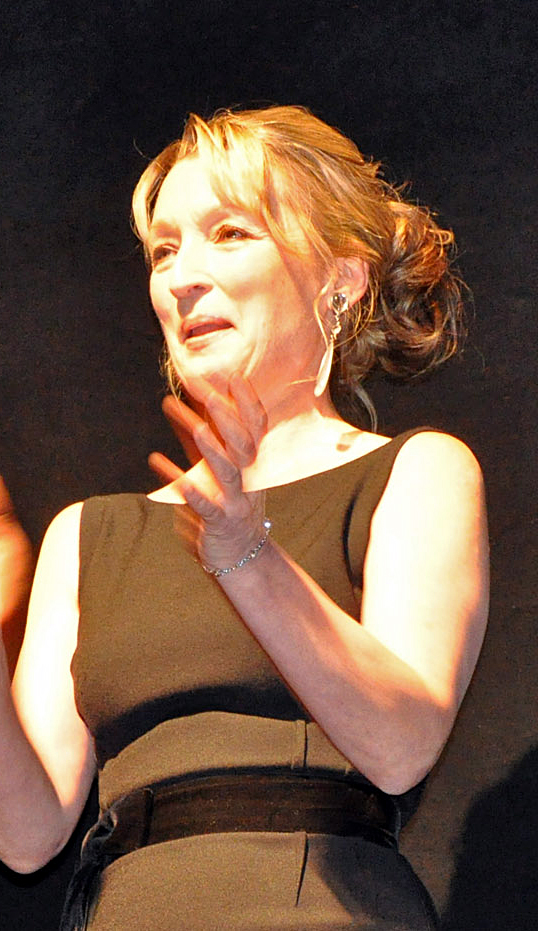
Lesley Manville

- George K. Arthur (1899–1985)
- Alexandra Bastedo (1946–2014)
- Daniel Betts (born 1971)
- Amanda Burton (born 1956)
- Gwendoline Christie (born 1978)
- Sophie Cookson (born 1990)
- Michael Elphick (1946–2002)
- Tara Fitzgerald (born 1967)
- Philip Friend (born 1915–1987)
- Judy Geeson (born 1948)
- Nigel Humphreys (born 1951)
- Katie Johnson (born 1878–1957)
- Jane Leeves (born 1961) ('Frasier')
- Lesley Manville (born 1956)
- Charlotte Mardyn (1789–1844)
- Anna Massey (1937–2011)
- Tamzin Merchant (born 1987)
- Cecil Parker (1897–1971)
- Amanda Redman (born 1957)
- Dakota Blue Richards (born 1994)
- David Ryall (1935–2014)
- Greta Scacchi (born 1960)
- Nicollette Sheridan (born 1963)
- Hugh Williams (1904–1969)

=== Architects ===
- Robert Knott Blessley (1833–1923), architect
- Charles Busby (1786–1834), architect
- Somers Clarke (1841–1926), architect
- Ernest Coxhead (1863–1933), Sussex-born American architect
- John Leopold Denman (1882–1975), architect
- George Devey (1820–1886), architect
- Frederick Charles Eden (1864–1944), architect
- Walter Godfrey (1881–1961), architect
- Piers Gough (born 1946), architect
- Nicholas Grimshaw (born 1939), architect
- Thomas Lainson (1825–1898), architect
- Harvey Lonsdale Elmes (1814–1847), architect
- Hugh May (1621–1684), architect
- John Rebecca (died 1847), architect
- Ian Ritchie (born 1947), architect
- Edward Sargent (1842–1914), Sussex-born American architect
- Henry Bingham Towner (1909–1997), architect
- Randall Wells (1877–1942), architect
- Amon Henry Wilds (1784 or 1790–1857), architect
- Amon Wilds (1762–1833), architect

=== Artists ===
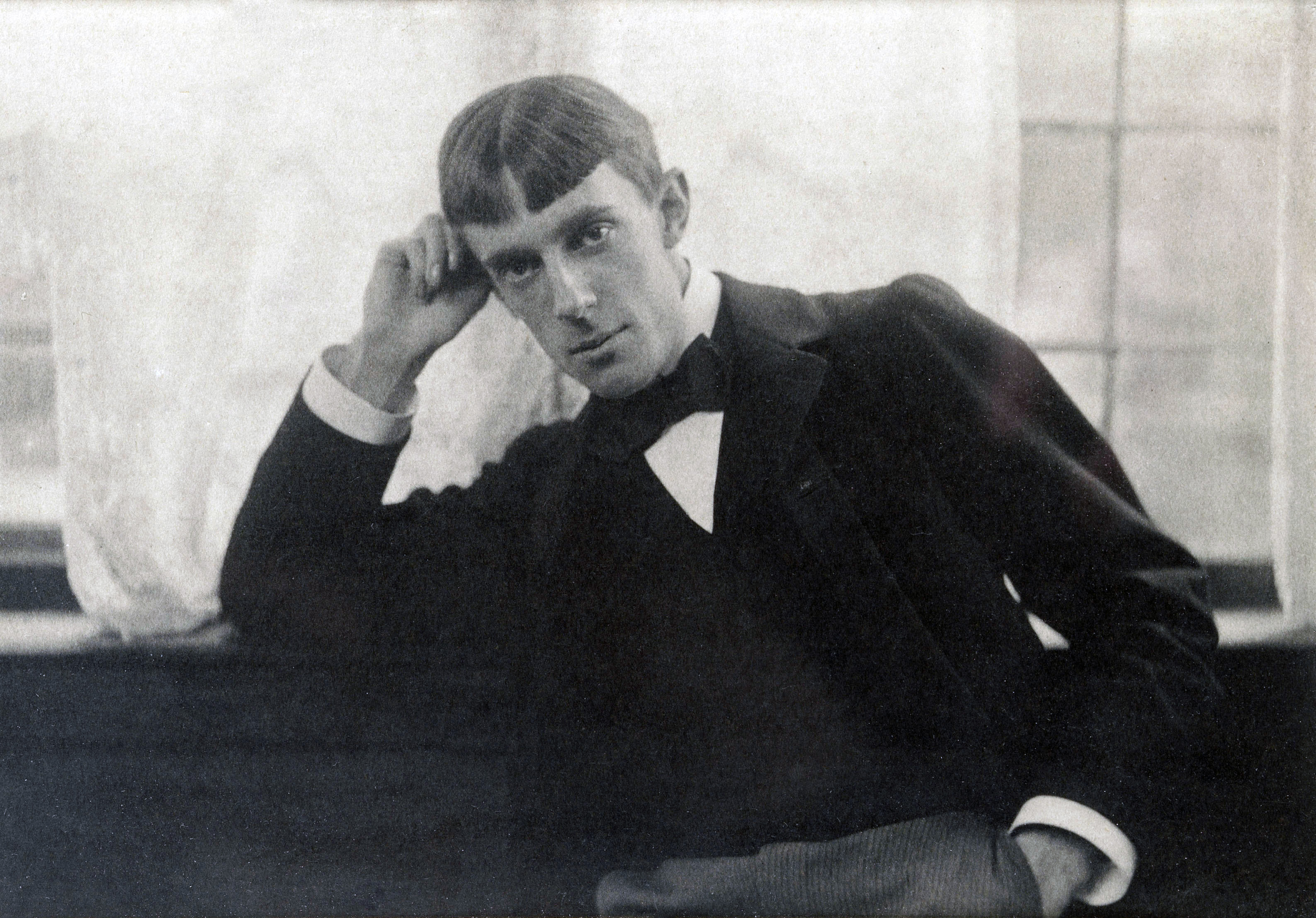
Aubrey Beardsley

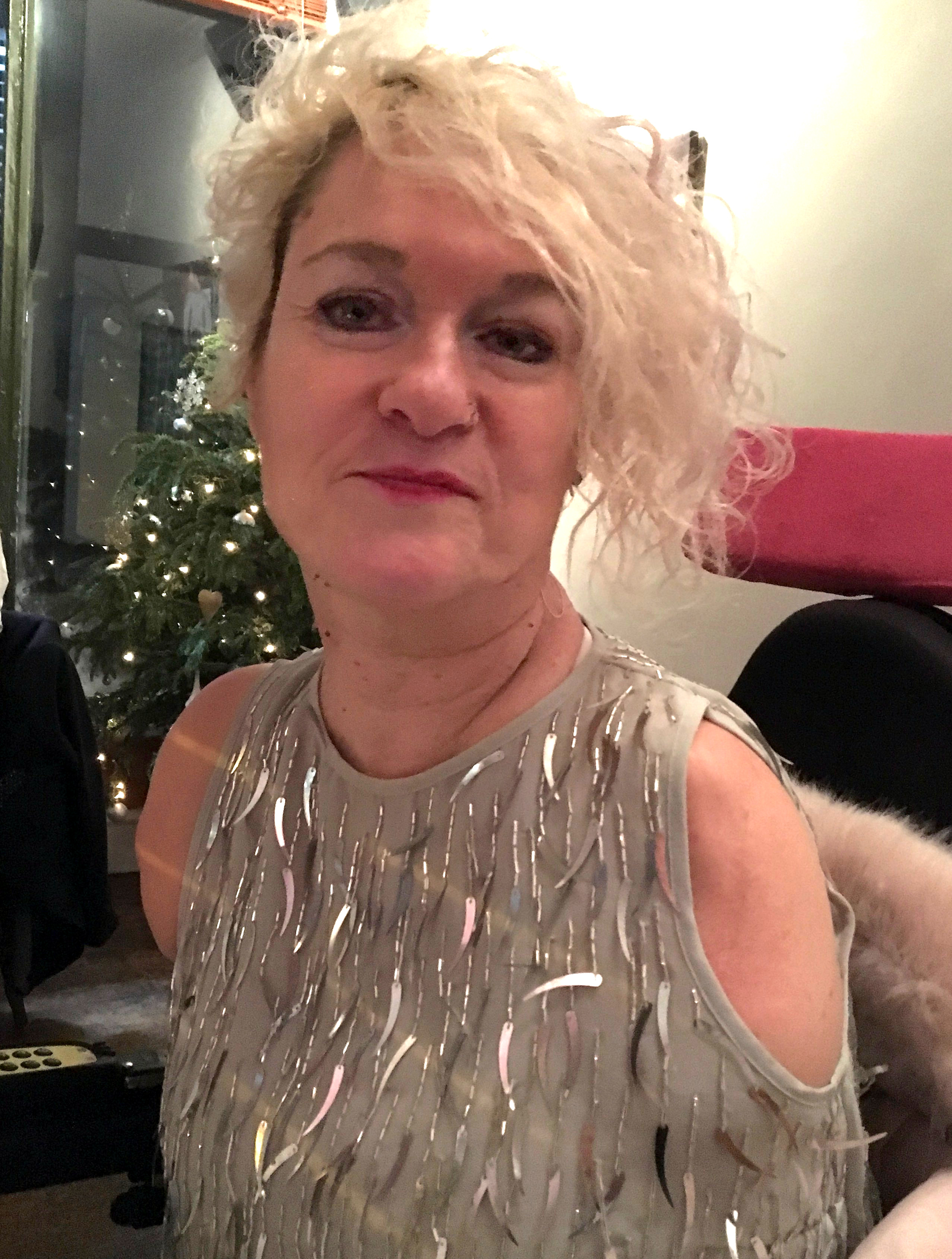
Alison Lapper

- Helen Cordelia Angell (1847–1884), watercolour painter
- Aubrey Beardsley (1872–1898), illustrator
- Raymond Briggs (1934–2022), illustrator, cartoonist and graphic novelist
- Edward Burra (1905–1976), painter
- Russell Drysdale (1912–1981), Sussex-born Australian artist
- Clifford Ellis (1907–1985), printmaker, painter and designer
- Ralph Ellis (1885–1963), painter and designer of inn signs
- Eric Gill (1882–1940), sculptor, typeface designer and printmaker
- Gluck (1895–1978), painter
- Patricia Goldsmith (1929–2017), painter and printmaker
- Captain Thomas Honywood (1819–1888), photographer
- Jamie Hewlett (born 1968), comic creator, animator and designer
- Edward Johnston (1872–1944), Uruguayan-born craftsman and calligrapher
- Alison Lapper (born 1965), artist
- Raoul Millais (1901–1999), portrait painter and equestrian artist
- Lee Miller (1907–1977), American-born photographer
- Marianne North (1830–1890), botanical artist
- Paul Pagk (born 1962), painter
- Roland Penrose (1900–1984), artist and collector of modern art
- Eric Ravilious (1903–1942), painter, designer, book illustrator and wood-engraver
- George Smith (1713/14-1776), landscape painter
- Hilary Stratton (1906–1985), sculptor
- Paddy Summerfield (born 1929), artist
- Paul Tanqueray (1905–1991), photographer
- Alan Thornhill (1921–2020), sculptor
- Alfred Tidey (1808–1892), miniature-painter

=== Broadcasters ===
- Zoe Ball (born 1970), television and radio presenter
- Hermione Cockburn (born 1973), television and radio presenter
- Simon Fuller (born 1960), television producer
- Sarah Kennedy (born 1950), television and radio presenter
- Des Lynam (born 1942), television presenter
- Piers Morgan (born 1965), broadcaster and journalist
- Richard Osman (born 1970), television presenter
- Jon Snow (born 1947), television presenter and journalist
- Jamie Theakston (born 1970), television and radio presenter
- Dan Walker (born 1977), television presenter, journalist and newsreader
- Holly Willoughby (born 1981), television presenter

=== Comedians ===
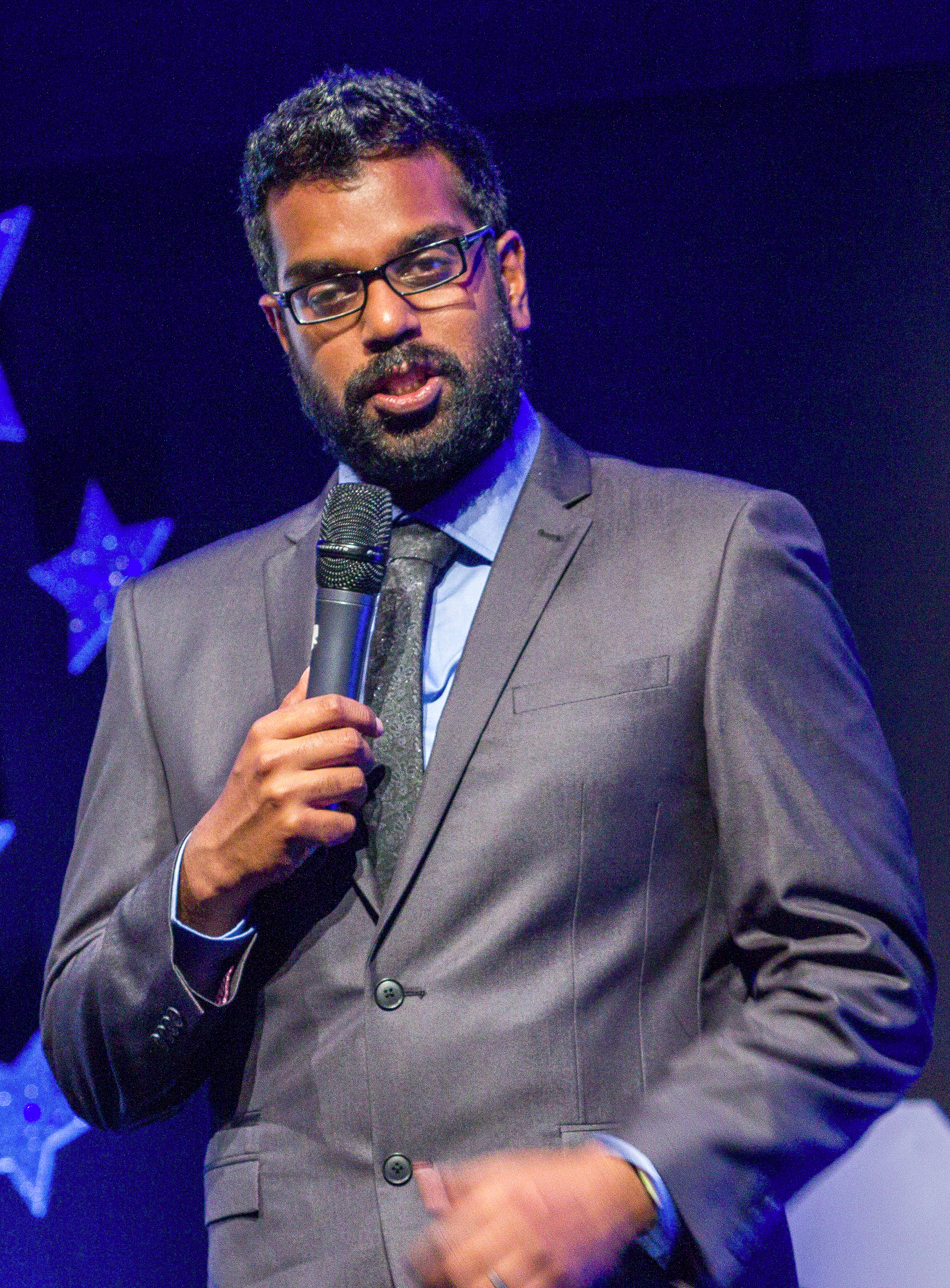
Romesh Ranganathan

- James Bachman (born 1972), comedian
- Jo Brand (born 1957), comedian
- Harry Enfield (born 1961), comedian
- Stephen Grant (born 1973), comedian
- Tony Hawks (born 1960), comedian
- Alex Horne (born 1978), comedian
- Zoe Lyons (born 1971), comedian
- Max Miller (1894–1963), comedian
- Simon Nye (born 1958), comic television writer
- Paul Putner (born 1966), comedian
- Romesh Ranganathan (born 1978), comedian

=== Dancers ===
- Francesca Hayward (born 1992), ballet dancer
- Nancy Osbaldeston (born 1989), ballet dancer

=== Fashion designers ===
- Stella McCartney (born 1971)
- Ted Tinling (1910–1990)

=== Filmmakers ===
- Adrian Brunel (1892–1958), film director and screenwriter
- Charles Bennett (1899–1995), film director and screenwriter
- Don Chaffey (1917–1990), film director, screenwriter and producer
- Matt Charman (born 1979), screenwriter and producer
- Jack Clayton (1921–1995), film director and producer
- Graham Cutts (1884–1958), film director
- Brian Eastman (born 1949), film producer
- Sean Ellis (born 1970), film director, screenwriter and producer
- Robert Fox (born 1952), film producer
- Charles Frend (1909–1977), film director
- Manning Haynes (1889–1957), film director
- Adam Stephen Kelly (born 1990), film director, screenwriter and producer
- Pete Walker (born 1939), film director, screenwriter and producer

=== Musicians ===
- Charlesia Alexis (1934–2012), Chagossian singer
- Anohni (born 1971), singer
- Brett Anderson (born 1967), singer (Suede, The Tears)
- Florence Aylward (1862–1950), composer
- Tony Banks (born 1950), keyboardist
- Natasha Bedingfield (born 1981), singer-songwriter
- Wilfred Brown (1921–1971), tenor
- Henry Burstow (1826–1916), folk singer and bellringer
- Clara Butt (1872–1936), contralto
- Nick Cave (born 1957), Australian-born singer, songwriter
- Celeste (born 1994), singer and songwriter
- Tom Chaplin (born 1979), singer-songwriter and musician (Keane)
- Shirley Collins (born 1935), folk singer
- Ms. Dynamite (born 1981), singer
- Keith Emerson (1944–2016), keyboardist, songwriter and composer
- Gary Farr (born 1944), folk/blues singer
- Ruth Gipps (1921–1999), composer
- Dominic Glynn (born 1960), electronic composer
- Harry Gregson-Williams (born 1961), composer
- Mike Hazlewood (1941–2001), singer, composer and songwriter
- Nigel Kennedy (born 1956), violinist and violist
- William Henry Kerridge (1881–1940), organist
- Pete Kirtley (born 1972), songwriter
- Vera Lynn (1917–2020), singer and songwriter
- Conor Maynard (born 1992), singer-songwriter
- James McCartney (born 1977), musician and songwriter
- Paul McCartney (born 1942), singer-songwriter, has lived near Rye since the late 1970s
- Isolde Menges (1893–1976), violinist
- Tom Odell (born 1990), singer-songwriter
- Ray Noble (1903–1978), bandleader
- Passenger (born 1984), singer-songwriter, musician
- Maisie Peters (born 2000), singer-songwriter
- Luke Pritchard (born 1985), lead-singer of The Kooks
- Rag'n'Bone Man (born 1985), singer and songwriter
- Leslie Rands (1900–1972), opera singer
- Tim Rice-Oxley (born 1976), musician and singer (Keane)
- Leo Sayer (born 1948), singer-songwriter
- Robert Smith (born 1959), singer, songwriter, musician (The Cure)
- Spider Stacy (born 1958), musician, singer, songwriter (The Pogues)
- Suggs (born 1961), singer-songwriter, musician (Madness)
- Nick Van Eede (born 1958), musician, producer, songwriter
- Thomas Weelkes (1576–1623), composer and organist
- Bruce Welch (born 1941), guitarist
- Wreckless Eric (born 1954), singer-songwriter
- Nicholas Yonge (c.1560–1619), singer

=== Writers ===
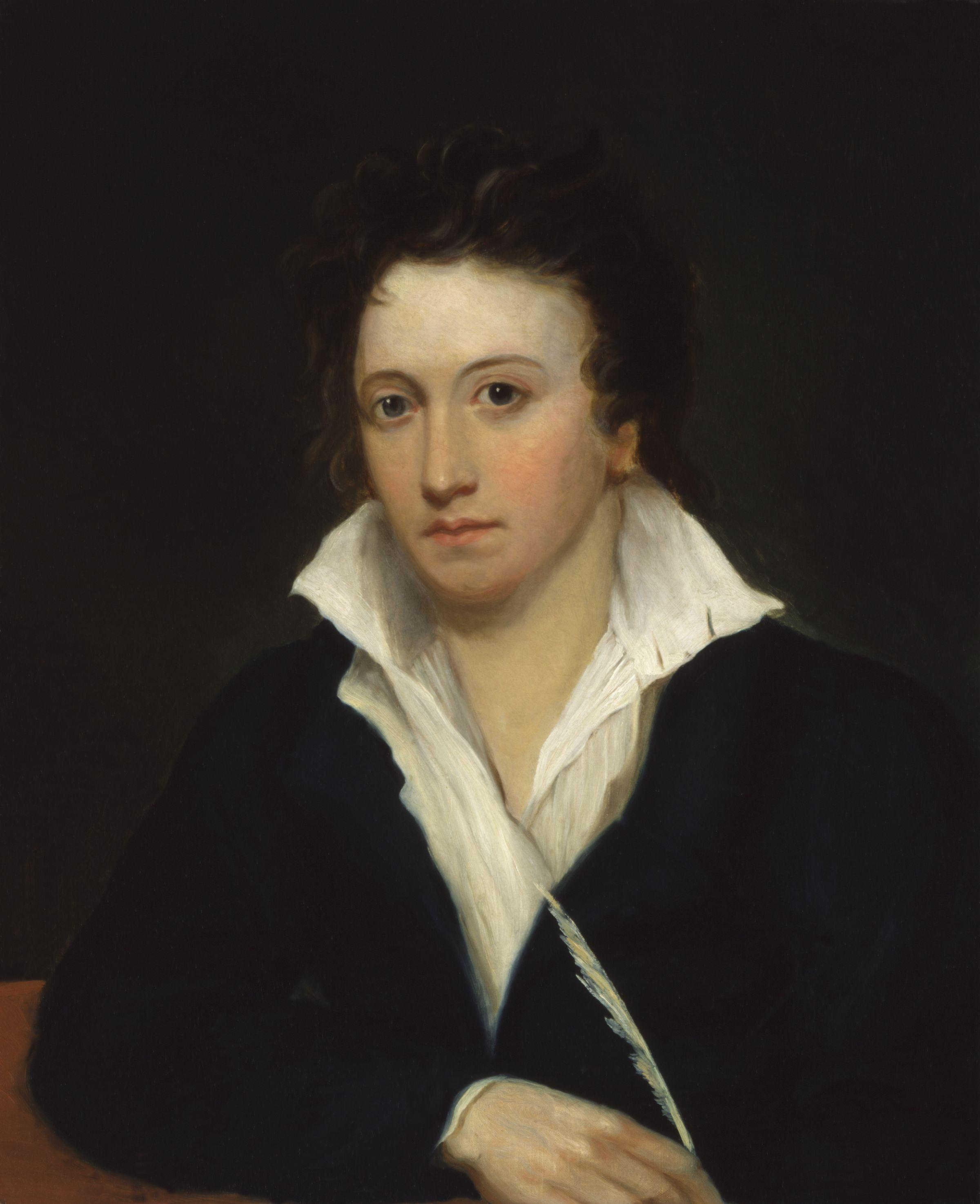
Percy Bysshe Shelley

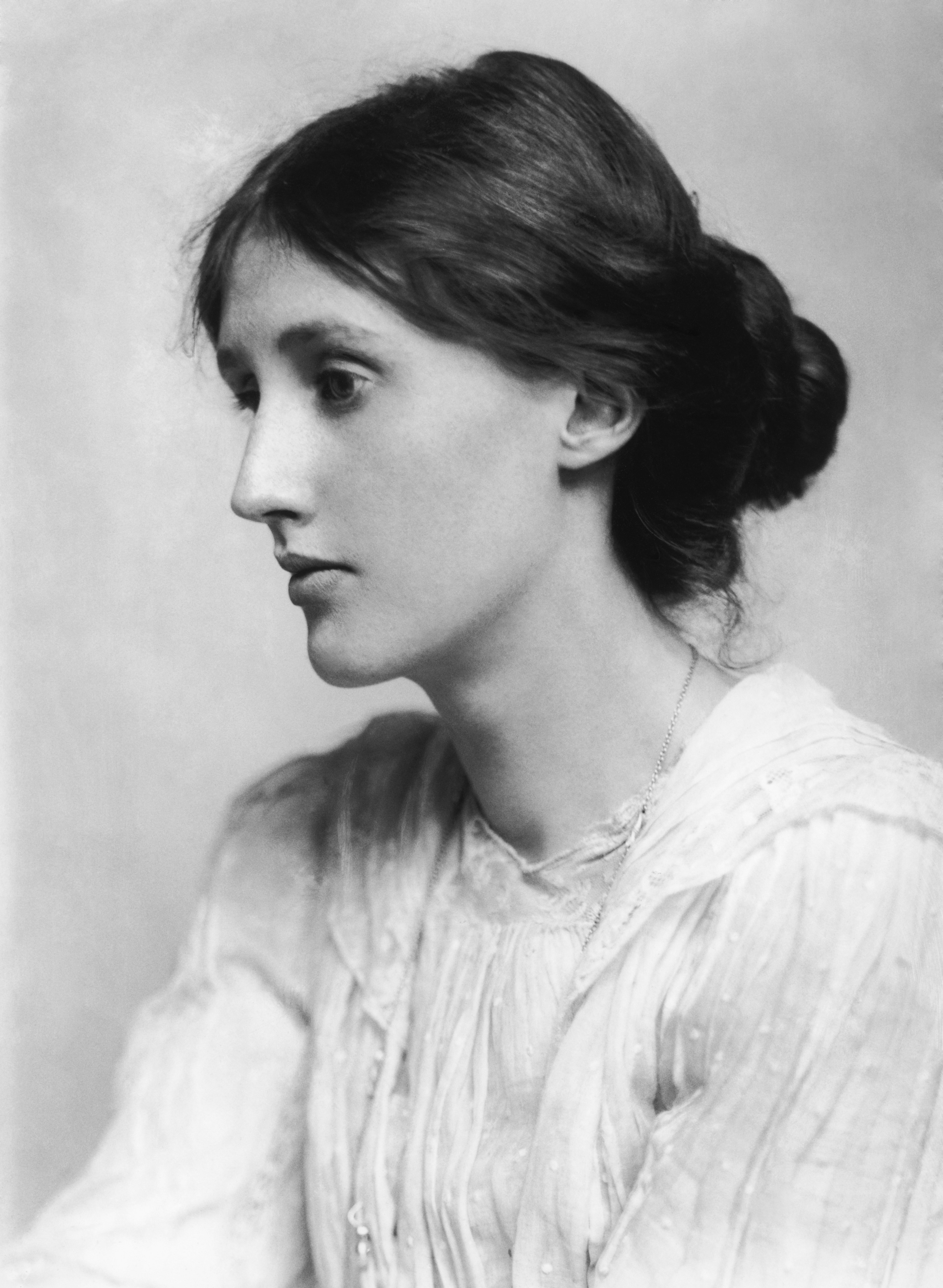
Virginia Woolf

- Conrad Aiken (1889–1973), American-born writer and poet
- Joan Aiken (1924–2004), novelist
- Jane Aiken Hodge (1917–2009), American-born writer
- John Agard (born 1949), Guyanese-born poet
- Vivien Alcock (1924–2003), writer of children's books
- Val Andrews (1926–2006), prolific writer on magic
- Attila the Stockbroker (born 1957), punk poet
- David Bangs, writer and conservationist
- Elizabeth Bartlett (1924–2008), poet
- Viola Bayley (1911–1997), children's author
- Aubrey Beardsley (1872–1898), author
- Grey Owl (Archibald Stansfield Belaney; 1888–1938)
- Hilaire Belloc (1870–1953), poet and writer
- Marie Belloc Lowndes (1868–1947), novelist
- E. F. Benson (1867–1940), writer
- Clementina Black (1853–1922), writer
- William Blake (1757–1827), poet
- Wilfrid Scawffen Blunt (1840–1922), poet and writer
- Andrew Boorde (c.1490–1549)
- Joyce Lankester Brisley (1896–1978), writer
- Arabella Buckley (1840–1929), writer
- Anthony Burgess (1917–1993), novelist, wrote A Clockwork Orange in Etchingham
- Anna Burns (born 1962), novelist
- Edward Carpenter (1844–1929), poet
- John Caryll (senior) (1625–1711), poet and dramatist
- William Collins (1721–1759), poet
- Eliza Cook (1818–1889), writer and Chartist
- Catherine Cookson (1906–1998), author
- E.M. Delafield (1890–1943), author
- Alice Dudeney (1866–1945), author and short story writer
- Henry Dudeney (1857–1930), author
- Maureen Duffy (1933–2026), poet, novelist, non-fiction author
- Anne Francis (1738–1800), author
- John Fletcher (1579–1625), playwright
- Ford Madox Ford (1873–1939), novelist and poet
- John Galsworthy (1867–1933), novelist and playwright
- Neil Gaiman (born 1960), fantasy writer
- Leon Garfield (1921–1996), writer of children's fiction
- Angelica Garnett (1918–2012), writer and artist
- David Garnett (1892–1981), writer
- Rumer Godden (1907–1998), writer
- Leon Gordon (1891–1960), playwright
- Elly Griffiths (born 1963), crime novelist
- Patrick Hamilton (1904–1962), playwright and novelist
- David Hare (born 1947), playwright and screenwriter
- William Hay (1695–1755), writer
- William Hayley (1745–1820), writer
- Ralph Hammond Innes (1913–1998), novelist
- Edward James (1907–1984), poet
- Henry James (1843–1916), American author
- Peter James (born 1948), writer of crime fiction
- P.J. Kavanagh (1931–2015), poet
- Sheila Kaye-Smith (1887–1956), novelist
- Grace Kimmins (1870–1954)
- Rudyard Kipling (1865–1936), poet and novelist
- Damian Le Bas (born 1985), writer
- Theodora Elizabeth Lynch (1812–1885), poet and novelist
- Peter Marshall (born 1946), biographer, travel writer and poet
- Thomas May (1594/5-1650), poet and dramatist
- Thomas Medwin (1788–1869), writer and poet
- A. A. Milne (1882–1956), author, best known for his Winnie-the-Pooh books
- Kate Mosse (born 1961), novelist
- Grace Nichols (born 1950), Guyanese-born poet
- William Nicholson (born 1948), screenwriter, novelist and playwright
- Thomas Otway (1652–1685), dramatist
- Hilary Douglas Clark Pepler (1878–1951), writer and poet
- Roland Penrose (1900–1984), poet and artist
- Valentine Penrose (1898–1978), French-born surrealist poet and author
- Alex Preston (born 1979), author and journalist
- Bessie Rayner Parkes (1829–1925), writer
- Richard Realf (1832–1878), poet
- Thomas Sackville, 1st Earl of Dorset (1536–1608), poet and dramatist
- Malcolm Saville (1901–1982), author
- Percy Bysshe Shelley (1792–1822), Romantic poet
- Chris Simms (born 1969), author of crime novels
- George Smith (1713/14-1776), poet
- Noel Streatfeild (1895–1986), author
- Alfred, Lord Tennyson (1809–1892), poet
- Isabella Tree (born 1964), writer and conservationist
- Robert Tressell (1870–1911), novelist, The Ragged-Trousered Philanthropists
- Frank Tuohy (1925–1999), writer
- Charles Webb (1939–2020), American novelist, The Graduate
- H. G. Wells (1866–1946), writer
- Barbara Willard (1909–1994), novelist
- Angus Wilson (1913–1991), novelist and short-story writer
- Virginia Woolf (1882–1941), writer

== Astronauts ==
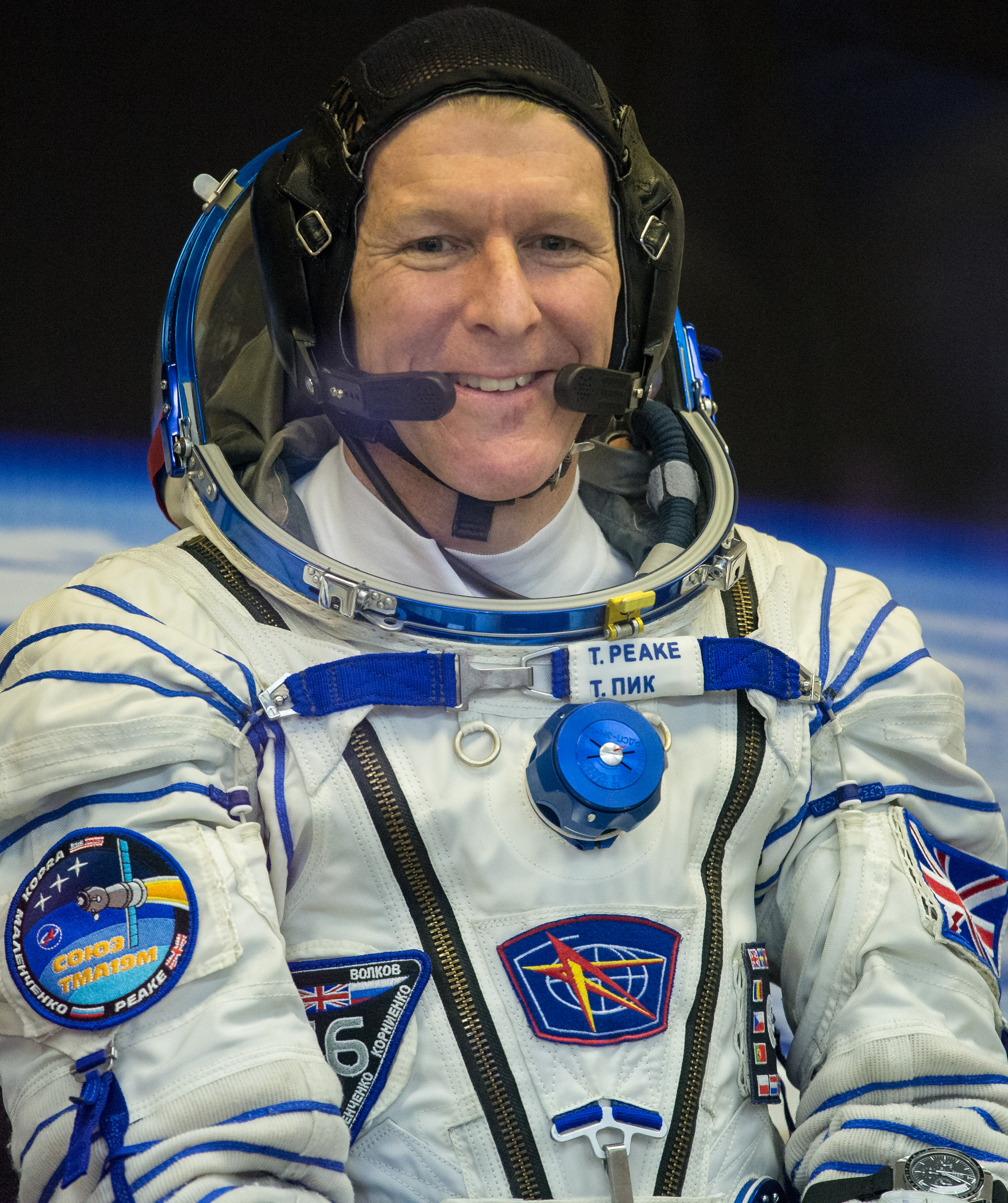
Tim Peake

- Sultan Al Neyadi (born 1981), United Arab Emirates-born astronaut
- Rosemary Coogan (born 1991), Northern Ireland-born astronaut
- Tim Peake (born 1972)
- Piers Sellers (1955–2016)

== Explorers ==
- Thomas Bannister (1799–1874), explorer of Western Australia
- Victor L. A. Campbell (1875–1956), Antarctic explorer
- Isabella Charlet-Straton (1838–1918), mountaineer, made first winter ascent of Mont Blanc
- Charles Cooke Hunt (1833–1868), explorer of interior of Western Australia
- Nicholas Crane (born 1954), explorer and television presenter
- Ernest Joyce (1875–1940), Antarctic explorer
- Cecil Pashley (1891–1961), aviation pioneer

== Military personnel ==
- Sidney Godley (1889–1957), recipient of Victoria Cross
- G. F. Gorringe (1868–1945), field commander
- Roger P. Hill (1910–2001), Royal Navy commander
- Ernest Joyce (1875–1940), Royal Navy seaman and explorer
- Frederick Tees (1922–1982), RAF gunner (Operation Chastise)
- Arthur David Torlesse (1902–1995), Royal Navy officer
- Cicely Ethel Wilkinson (1882/83–1967), possibly the only woman to qualify as a pilot in Britain during the First World War

== Monarchs and nobility ==
- Adeliza of Louvain (c.1103–1151), queen of England 1121–1135
- Aelle of Sussex (fl.c.477–c.514), king of Sussex
- Aethelwalh of Sussex (fl.c.660–c.685), king of Sussex
- Queen Camilla (born 1947), wife of Charles III
- Eppillus (fl. c. 20BC–AD7), Iron Age king with capital at Chichester
- Tiberius Claudius Cogidubnus (fl. 1st century AD), king of Regni
- George IV (1762–1830), king of the United Kingdom and King of Hanover 1820–1830
- Godwin, Earl of Wessex (died 1053), Earl of Wessex and father of Harold Godwinson, the last Anglo-Saxon king of England
- Verica (fl. c. AD15–AD42), king of southern Atrebates with capital at Chichester

== Philanthropists ==
- Octav Botnar (1913–1998)
- Richard Churcher (1659–1723)
- Mad Jack Fuller (1757–1834)
- Ann Thwaytes (1789–1866)
- Jane Woodward (1823/4–1894)

== Politicians and activists ==
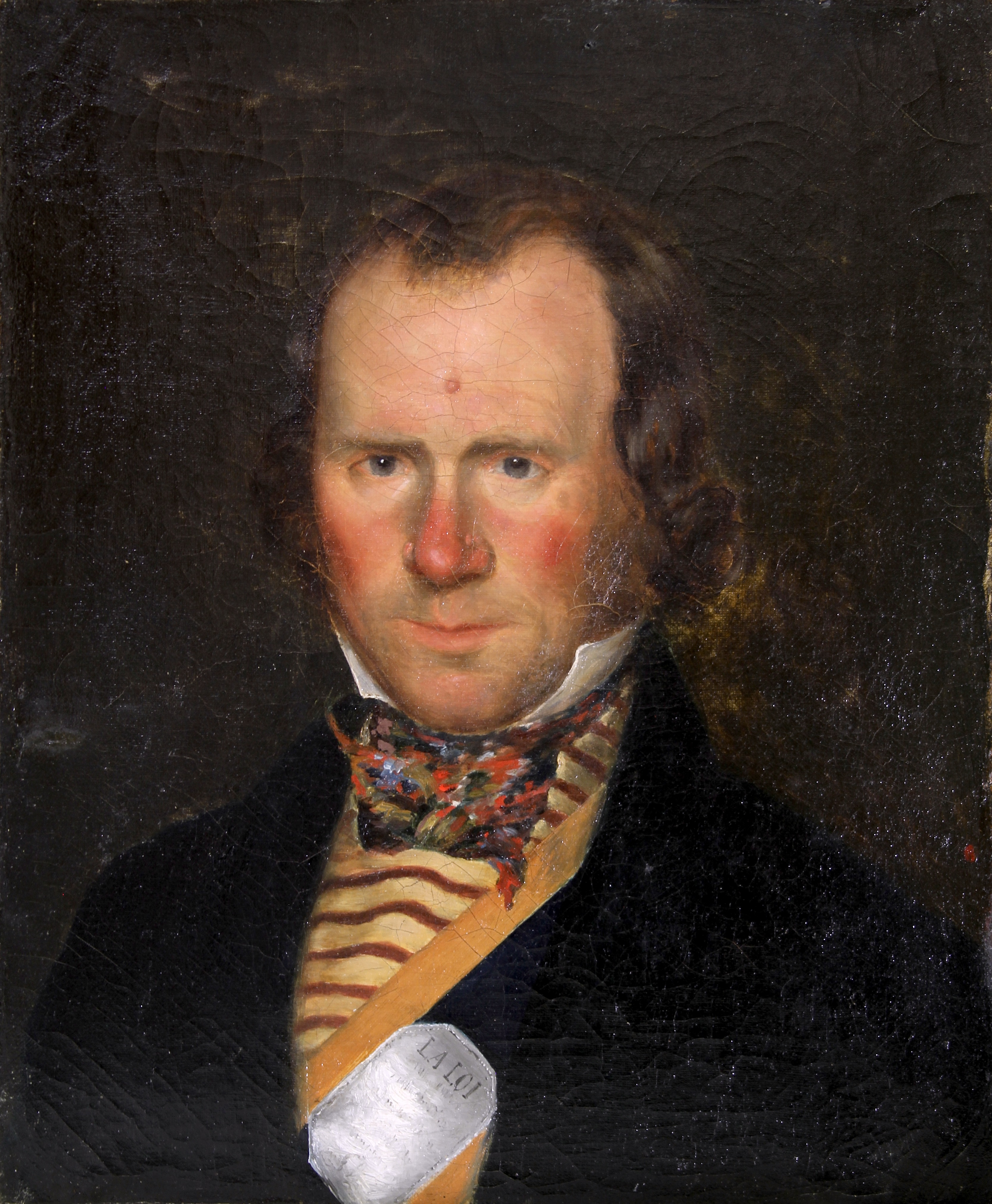
Richard Cobden

- Edith Ayrton (1879–1945), suffragist
- Barbara Bodichon (1827–1891), feminist and women's rights activist
- Clementina Black (1853–1922), feminist and trade unionist
- James Callaghan (1912–2005), former prime minister of the United Kingdom 1976–1979
- Anna Campbell (1991–2018), feminist, anarchist and prison abolition activist who fought with the Women's Protection Units (YPJ) in the Rojava Conflict of the Syrian Civil War
- Edward Carpenter (1844–1929), early activist for gay rights and animal rights
- William Cawley (1602–1667), regicide and MP
- Jane Cobden (1851–1947), suffragist
- Richard Cobden (1804–1865), MP and co-founder of Anti-Corn Law League
- Maureen Colquhoun (1928–2021), UK's first openly lesbian MP
- Margery Corbett Ashby (1882–1981), suffragist, feminist and internationalist
- Cicely Corbett Fisher (1885–1959), suffragist and workers' rights activist
- Freeman Freeman-Thomas, 1st Marquess of Willingdon (1866–1941), politician, former governor general of Canada and former viceroy and governor-general of India
- Harry Hay (1912–2002), Sussex-born American gay rights activist
- James Henty (1800–1882), Sussex-born Australian politician
- Douglas Hogg, 1st Viscount Hailsham, lawyer, politician and Lord Chancellor
- Sabrina Jean (born 1973), Chagossian activist
- Sophia Jex-Blake (1840–1912), suffragist
- Jenny Jones, Baroness Jones of Moulsecoomb (born 1949), first Green Party member of the House of Lords
- Helen Joseph (1905–1992), anti-apartheid activist
- Jomo Kenyatta (c.1897–1978), first prime minister and president of Kenya
- Imran Khan (born 1952), current prime minister of Pakistan
- Charles Lennox, 3rd Duke of Richmond (1735–1806), known as the 'radical duke', probable owner of 'Sussex declaration' of US independence
- Caroline Lucas (born 1960), first Green Party MP
- Harold Macmillan (1894–1986), prime minister of the United Kingdom 1957–1963
- Louisa Martindale (1839–1914), suffragist and workers' rights activist
- Theresa May (born 1956), former prime minister of the United Kingdom 2016–2019
- John Merfold (fl 1450–51), leader of 1450 uprising Henry VI
- William Merfold (fl 1450–51), leader of 1450 uprising against Henry VI
- Ralph Neville (died 1244), Lord Chancellor of England
- Thomas Paine (1737–1809), political activist
- Henry Pelham (1694–1754), prime minister of the United Kingdom 1743–1754
- Tony Penikett (born 1945), premier of Yukon 1985–1992
- William Penn (1644–1718), founder of the Province of Pennsylvania, lived at Warminghurst
- Bessie Rayner Parkes (1829–1925), feminist
- Anita Roddick (1942–2007), human rights activist and environmental campaigner
- Anthony Stapley (1590–1655), regicide and MP
- William Bridgland Steer (1867–1939), trade unionist and politician
- Allen Vincatassin, first and current president of the Diego Garcia and Chagos Islands Council

== Religious figures ==
=== Archbishops ===
- Thomas Arundel (1353–1414), archbishop of Canterbury, 1397–1399 and Archbishop of York
- Thomas Bradwardine (1300–1349), archbishop of Canterbury, 1349
- Accepted Frewen (1588–1664), archbishop of York
- William Juxon (1582–1663), archbishop of Canterbury 1660–1663
- Henry Edward Manning (1808–1892), archbishop of Westminster (1865–1892) and cardinal of the Roman Catholic Church
- Cormac Murphy-O'Connor (1932–2017), archbishop of Westminster and cardinal of the Roman Catholic Church (2000–2009)
- John Peckham (c.1230–1292), archbishop of Canterbury 1279–1292

=== Martyrs ===
- George Gervase (1571–1608), martyred Catholic priest
- James Hannington (1847–1885), Anglican missionary and martyr
- Thomas Pilchard (11557-1587), Catholic priest and martyr
- Edward Shelley (c.1530–1588), Catholic martyr
- Richard Shelley (died 1586), Catholic recusant
- Richard Woodman (c.1524–1557), Protestant martyr

=== Saints ===
- Cuthmann of Steyning (c.681–8th century), saint
- Leofwynn of Bishopstone (fl 7th century), saint
- Richard of Chichester (1197–1253), patron saint of Sussex
- Philip Howard, 13th Earl of Arundel (1557–1595), Catholic saint

=== Other religious leaders ===
- Matthew Caffyn (1628–1714), General Baptist preacher
- Richard Challoner (1691–1781), Roman Catholic bishop and leading figure of English Catholicism
- Cornelia Connelly (1809–1879), US-born founder of the Society of the Holy Child Jesus and Mayfield School, Mayfield
- Richard Enraght (1837–1898), Irish-born Anglo-Catholic priest
- John Sirgood (1822–1885), Gloucestershire-born fundamentalist lay preacher, founder of Society of Dependants
- Thomas Stapleton (1535–1598), Catholic theologian
- Fiona Windsor (born 1956), archdeacon of Horsham, and the first female archdeacon in Sussex

== Scientists and scholars ==
=== Anthropologists ===
- E.E. Evans-Pritchard (1902–1973), anthropologist
- David Pilbeam (born 1940), palaeoanthropologist

=== Archaeologists ===
- John Pull (1899–1960)
- Mark Roberts (archaeologist) (born 1961)

=== Astronomers ===
- Patrick Moore (1923–2012), astronomer and broadcaster
- Ian Morison (born 1943), astronomer and astrophysicist
- Martin Ryle (1918–1984), radio astronomer, winner of Nobel Prize

=== Biologists ===
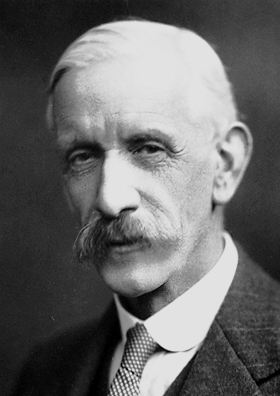
Frederick Gowland Hopkins

- William Borrer (1781–1862), botanist
- Edward Boyse (1923–2007), physician and biologist
- Barry Fell (1917–1994), zoologist
- Isabella Forshall (1900–1989), paediatric surgeon
- John Braxton Hicks (1823–1897), doctor and obstrecian
- Frederick Gowland Hopkins (1861–1947), biochemist and Nobel Prize winner
- Thomas Henry Huxley (1825–1895), biologist and anthropologist
- Sophia Jex-Blake (1840–1912), physician, pioneer female doctor
- Thomas H. Jukes (1906–1999), biologist known for his work in nutrition and molecular evolution
- Martin Holdgate (born 1931), biologist and environmental scientist
- Marianne North (1830–1890), biologist
- Richard Russell (1687–1759), physician
- Edith Rebecca Saunders (1865–1945), geneticist and plant anatomist
- F. M. L. Sheffield (1904–1973), botanist
- David Sims (born 1969), marine biologist
- Octavia Wilberforce (1888–1963), physician

=== Chemists ===
- Tom Blundell (born 1942), biochemist
- Martin Fleischmann (1927–2012), electrochemist
- Frederick Gowland Hopkins (1861–1947), biochemist and Nobel Prize winner
- Frederick Soddy (1877–1956), radiochemist

=== Computer scientists ===
- Stanley Gill (1926–1975), co-inventor of first computer subroutine
- Alan Turing (1912–1954)

=== Economists ===
- Richard Blundell (born 1952), economist and econometrician
- Richard Jolly (born 1934), development economist
- John Maynard Keynes (1883–1946), founder of Keynesian economics
- George Paish (1867–1957), economist

=== Geologists and palaeontologists ===
- Gideon Mantell (1790–1852), geologist, palaeontologist and obstetrician (discoverer of Iguanadon)

=== Historians ===
- Kevin Brownlow (born 1938), film historian
- Thomas Walker Horsfield (1792–1837), Yorkshire-born historian best known for his works on Sussex history
- Mark Antony Lower (1813–1876), known for his works on Sussex history, anti-Catholic propagandist and founder member of the Sussex Archaeological Society
- Elizabeth Norton (born 1986)
- Philip Payton (born 1953)
- Louis Francis Salzman (1878–1971), economic historian

=== Mathematicians ===
- Frank Anscombe (1918–2001), statistician
- Ruth Lawrence (born 1971)
- David Mumford (born 1937)
- John Pell (1611–1685)
- Harold Stanley Ruse (1905–1974)

=== Philosophers ===
- Thomas Bradwardine (1300–1349)
- Peter Kropotkin (1842–1921), anarcho-communist philosopher lived in Brighton
- Gilbert Ryle (1900–1976)

=== Physicists ===
- Emma Bunce (born 1975), space physicist
- Anthony French (1920–2017), physicist
- Alan Ernest Owen (1928–1999), physicist specialising in glass technology
- William Francis Gray Swann (1884–1962), physicist noted for his research into cosmic rays

=== Psychologists ===
- William Brown (1881–1952)
- Edward B. Titchener (1867–1927)

== Sportspeople ==
=== Boxers ===
- Chris Eubank Jr. (born 1989)
- Alan Minter (1951–2020)
- Ross Minter (born 1978)
- Tom Sayers (1826–1865)
- Scott Welch (born 1968), known as 'the Brighton Rock'

=== Cricketers ===
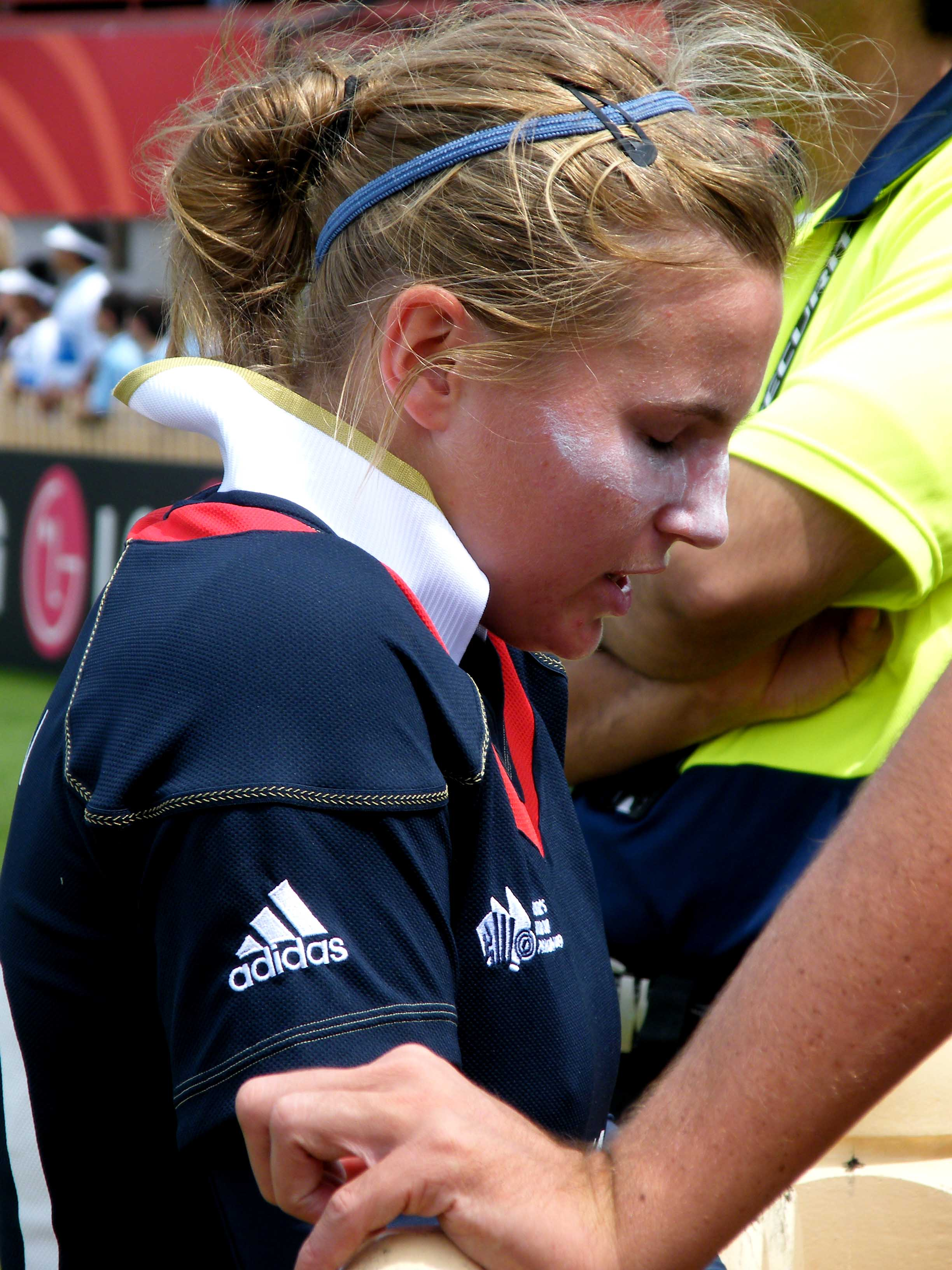
Holly Colvin

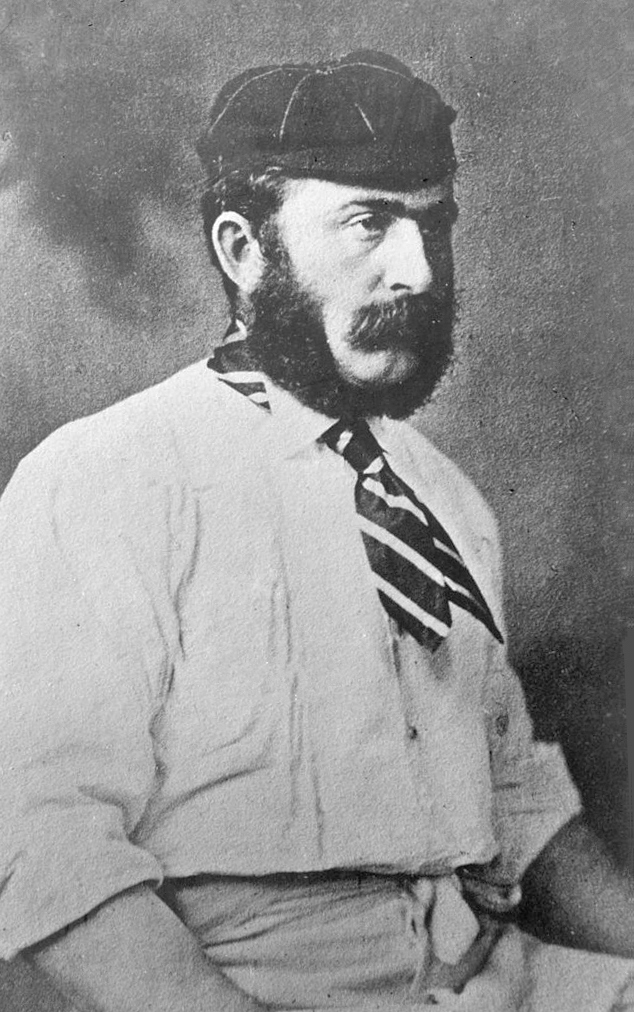
James Lillywhite

- Chris Adams (born 1970), captain of the Sussex men's team during their 'golden era' in the early 2000s
- Georgia Adams (born 1993)
- Caroline Atkins (born 1981)
- Jem Broadbridge (1795–1843)
- Henry Charlwood (1846–1888)
- Holly Colvin (born 1989)
- Clare Connor (born 1976)
- George Cox Sr (1873–1949)
- Mason Crane (born 1997)
- Jemmy Dean (1816–1881)
- Duleepsinhji (1905–1959)
- Ed Giddins (born 1971)
- William Henty (1808–1881), bowled the first ever ball in a first class cricket match in Australia
- Jack Hobbs (1882–1963)
- Chris Jordan (born 1988)
- James Kirtley (born 1975)
- James Langridge (1906–1966)
- James Lillywhite (1842–1929)
- John Lillywhite (1826–1874)
- William Lillywhite (1792–1854)
- Kate Oakenfold (born 1984)
- Alan Oakman (1930–2018)
- Jim Parks (born 1903) (1903–1980)
- Jim Parks (born 1931) (born 1931)
- Barbara Pont (born 1933)
- Matt Prior (born 1982), South African-born cricketer for Sussex and England
- Ranjitsinhji (1872–1933)
- Albert Relf (1874–1937)
- Charlie Russell (born 1988)
- James Southerton (1827–1880)
- Maurice Tate (1895–1956)
- Joe Vine (1875–1946)
- Alexia Walker (born 1982)
- Alan Wells (born 1961)
- Colin Wells (born 1960)
- John Wisden (1826–1884)
- Elaine Wulcko (born 1959)

=== Footballers ===
- Gareth Barry (born 1981)
- Tony Bloom (born 1970), chairman and owner of Brighton & Hove Albion and Royale Union Saint-Gilloise
- Lewis Dunk (born 1991)
- Jarvis Kenrick (1852–1949)
- Bobby Tambling (born 1941)
- Charles Wollaston (1849–1926)

=== Golfers ===
- Max Faulkner (1916–2005)
- Abe Mitchell (1887–1947)
- Marco Penge (born 1998)
- Mark Seymour (1897–1952)

=== Racing drivers ===
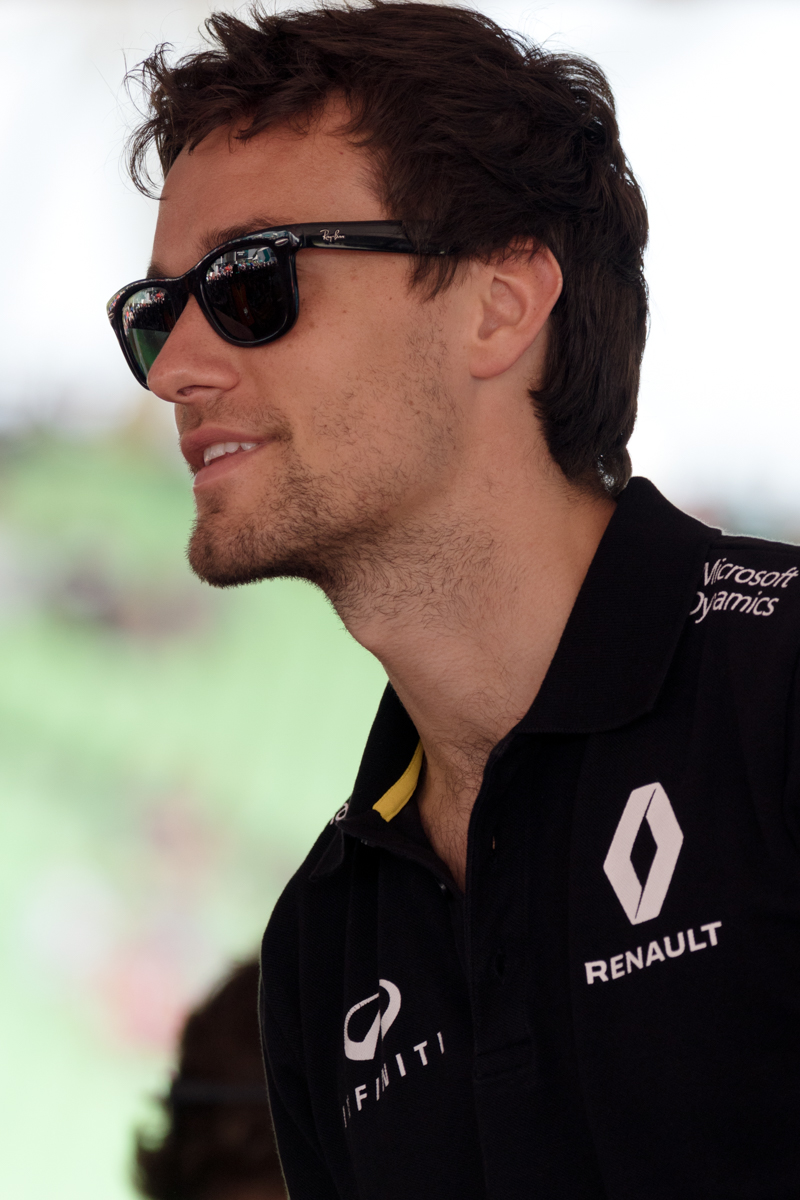
Jolyon Palmer

- Derek Bell (born 1941)
- Martin Dugard (born 1969)
- Selwyn Edge (1868–1940)
- David Nye (born 1958)
- Jolyon Palmer (born 1991)
- Will Palmer (born 1997)
- David Purley (1945–1985)
- Richard Seaman (1913–1939)
- Jimmy Broadbent (born 1991)

=== Tennis players ===
- Robin Blakelock (born 1941)
- Julian Cash (born 1996)
- Gladys Colston (1879–1969)
- Leslie Godfree (1885–1971), winner of men's doubles at Wimbledon
- Sonay Kartal (born 2001)
- Johanna Konta (born 1991)
- Anne Shilcock (1932–2019), winner of women's doubles at Wimbledon

=== Other sportspeople ===
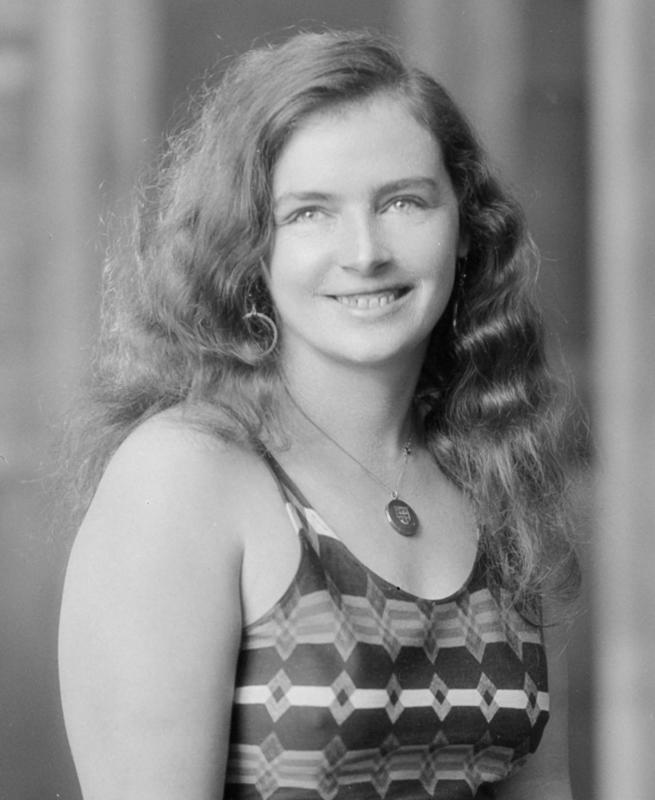
Mercedes Gleitze

- Chemmy Alcott (born 1982), ski racer
- Bob Champion (born 1948), jump jockey and Grand National winner
- Mark Davis (born 1972), snooker player
- Mercedes Gleitze (1900–1981), swimmer (first person to swim the Strait of Gibraltar, first British woman to swim the English Channel)
- Will Green (born 1973), rugby union player
- Guy Harwood (born 1939), racehorse trainer
- David Howell (born 1990), youngest UK chess grandmaster
- Richard Leman (born 1959), field hockey player
- Michael Olowokandi (born 1975), former NBA player
- Liam Treadwell (1986–2020), jockey
- Bly Twomey (born 2010), para table tennis player and bronze medallist at 2024 Summer Paralympics

== Other notables ==
- Beachy Head Lady (fl. early to mid-3rd century AD)
- Charles Burrell (born 1962), conservationist (Knepp Wildland Project)
- John Cripps (1927–2022), orchardist, responsible for creation of the Pink Lady ('Cripps Pink') and Sundowner ('Cripps Red') apples
- Martin Coles Harman (1885–1954), self-proclaimed king of Lundy
- Cecil Hurst (1870–1963), international lawyer, president of the Permanent Court of International Justice in The Hague (1934–1936) and chairman of the United Nations War Crimes Commission (1943–1945)
- Peter Love (died 1610), pirate
- John Selden (1584–1654), jurist
- Maria Ann Smith (1799–1870), orchardist, responsible for creation of the Granny Smith apple

== See also ==
- List of people from Brighton and Hove
- List of people from Hastings
- List of people from Lewes, East Sussex
- List of people from Littlehampton
- List of people from Worthing
- List of Sussex County Cricket Club players
- List of people from Cornwall
- List of people from Yorkshire

== Bibliography ==
- Olusoga, David (2016). Black and British: a Forgotten History. Pan Macmillan. ISBN 9781447299745.
