= List of Worthing inhabitants =

This is a list of notable inhabitants of the borough of Worthing in West Sussex, England. The demonym of Worthing is Worthingite. Those born in Worthing are listed in boldface.

Note that in the case of persons still living, they may not currently live within the area of the borough, but have done so at some time.

A B C D E F G H I J K L M N O P Q R S T U V W X Y Z

== A ==
- **Vivien Alcock** (1924–2003), children's author was born in Worthing.
- **Britt Allcroft** (1943–2024), writer/director/producer best known for creating Thomas the Tank Engine and Friends, grew up in Worthing.
- Lindsay Anderson, author, broadcaster, stage, television and film director attended prep school with his brother at St. Ronan's School, Downview Road, West Worthing.
- Anthea Askey, actress, lived in Worthing until her death in 1999.
- Jane Austen the author spent the autumn of 1805 residing at 'Stanford Cottage', Worthing.

== B ==
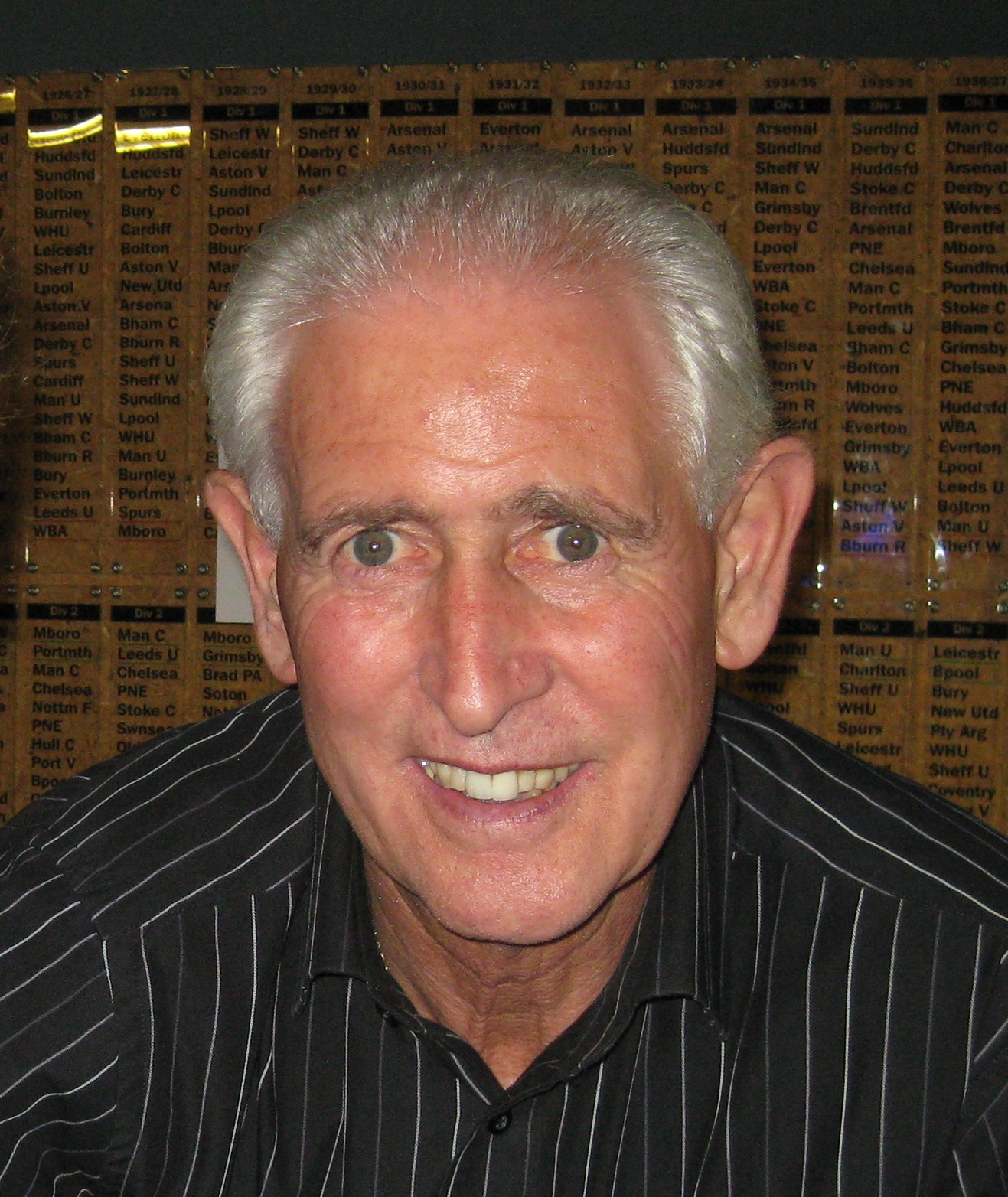
Peter Bonetti

- Vera Charlesworth Barclay, co-founder of Cubs 1916, author of over 50 books and one of the first women to ride The Cresta Run used to stay with her family in Alinora Crescent, Goring-by-Sea from 1960's to late 1970's .
- John Barron, actor, worked as an assistant stage manager at the Connaught Theatre
- **Greg Barker**, politician, was born in Worthing in 1966.
- Alexandra Bastedo Born 1946. Actress, model and animal lover. Lived at Sea Place, Worthing then West Chiltington.
- James Bateman, accomplished horticulturist and landowner, lived at 'Springbank' in Victoria Road until his death in 1897.
- Edwin Bennett, cricketer, lived in East Worthing until his death in 1929 aged just 35.
- **Richard Best**, former ambassador to Iceland, was born in the town in 1933.
- **Paul Blackman**, theatrical producer and director, was born in the town.
- **Hugh Blaker**, artist and museum curator, was born in the town in 1873.
- **Mary Blathwayt**, feminist, suffragette and social reformer was born in the town.
- Dave Benson-Phillips, children's television presenter, lives in the town.
- Jessie Bond, D'Oyly Carte Opera Company actress and singer moved to Worthing in the 1920s.
- Peter Bonetti, Chelsea and England goalkeeper, grew up in Worthing.
- **John Bowers**, was born in the town in 1924.
- **Edward Boyse**, eminent physician and biologist was born in the town in 1923.
- Leah Bracknell, actress known for playing popular lesbian character Zoe Tate for 16 years in popular ITV soap opera Emmerdale.
- Thomas Shaw Brandreth, mathematician, inventor and classicist lived in the town until he died in 1873.
- **Emma Bunce**, space physicist, was born in Worthing in 1975.
- Francis Burchell, cricketer, lived in Worthing until his death in 1947.
- Alfred Burges, civil engineer, lived in Worthing until his death in 1886 and founded almshouses in Clifton Road in 1859.
- Ron Burgess (1917–2005), professional footballer, retired to Worthing and lived there for some years before moving back to his native South Wales

== C ==
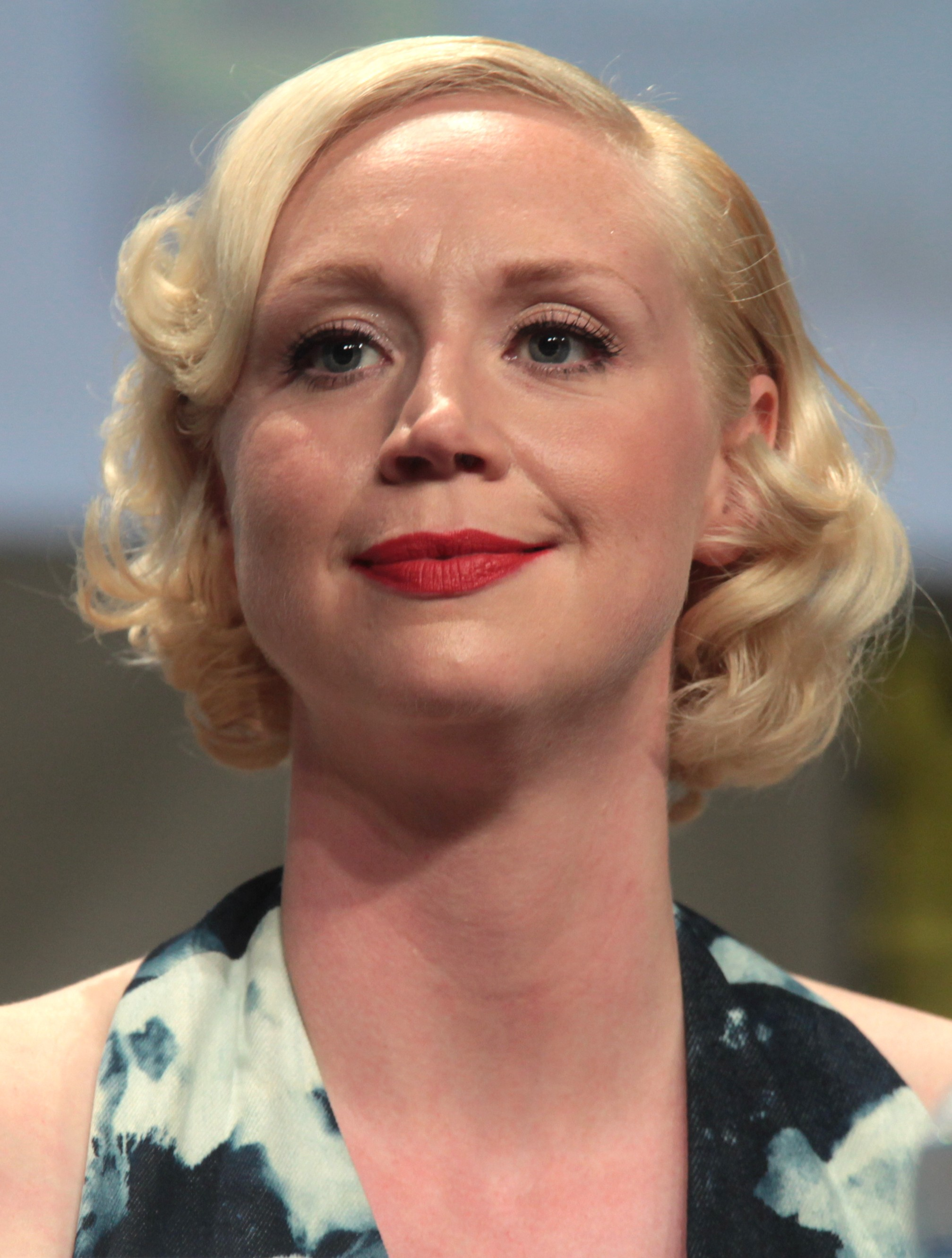
Gwendoline Christie in 2014

- **Jonathan Cake**, actor, was born in Worthing in 1967 and grew up in the town.
- Lady Colin Campbell, socialite and writer, bought Castle Goring in 2013.
- Tony Caunter, who played Roy Evans in EastEnders grew up in Worthing and went to Worthing High School.
- **Egerton Cecil**, cricketer, was born in Worthing in 1853.
- **Conor Chaplin**, footballer, was born in the town in 1997.
- Ellen Chapman, politician and first female councillor for Worthing.
- **Gwendoline Christie**, actress, was born in Worthing in 1978.
- Alma Cogan, 1950s recording artist, lived with her parents above their shop in Warwick Street, then moved to a large house on the corner of Lansdowne Road and Downview Road in West Worthing.
- Ken Coates, politician and writer, grew up in Worthing.
- Pauline Collins, actress, grew up in Worthing.
- **Russ Cook**, endurance athlete, first person to run from the southernmost point to the northernmost point of continental Africa.
- John Cooper, car maker, lived in Worthing until his death in 2001.
- Mason Crane, international cricketer, grew up in the town and attended Thomas a Becket School and Lancing College.
- **Paddy Croft**, actress, was born in the town.
- Freeman Wills Crofts, author of detective fiction, lived in Worthing from 1953 until his death in 1957.
- Toby Collyer footballer for Manchester United was born in Worthing

== D ==
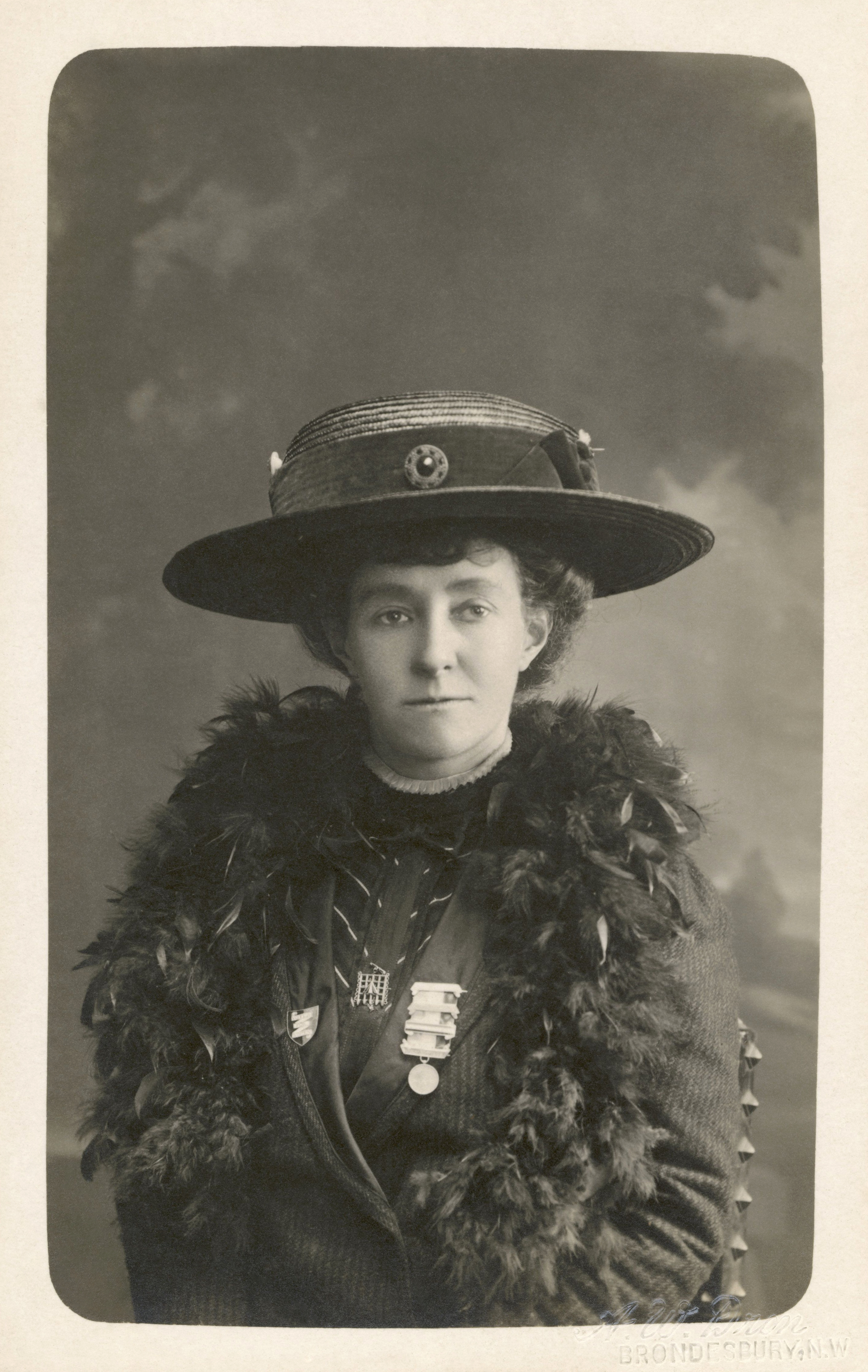
Emily Davison

- **Byron Dafoe**, goaltender for the Washington Capitals was born in the town in 1971.
- **Everard Davis**, sprinter, was born in Worthing in 1912.
- Emily Davison, a schoolteacher in Worthing, and later suffragette.
- **Mickey Demetriou**, footballer, was born in the Durrington area of the town in 1990.
- Walter Dew, the police officer involved in the hunt for Jack the Ripper and Dr Crippen, retired to Worthing and was buried in the town's Durrington Cemetery in 1947.
- **Maureen Duffy**, poet, novelist and playwright was born in the town in 1933.
- **Martin Dugard**, speedway rider, was born in Worthing in 1969.
- Alfred Dunhill, tobacconist and proprietor of Alfred Dunhill Ltd. lived in Worthing from 1929 to 1959 on the Charmandean estate in Broadwater

== E ==
- Keith Emerson, keyboard virtuoso and rockstar, grew up in Worthing.
- Edouard Espinosa, co-founder of the Royal Academy of Dance, lived in Brighton Road until his death in 1997.
- Gary Evans, professional golfer, is from Worthing.

== F ==
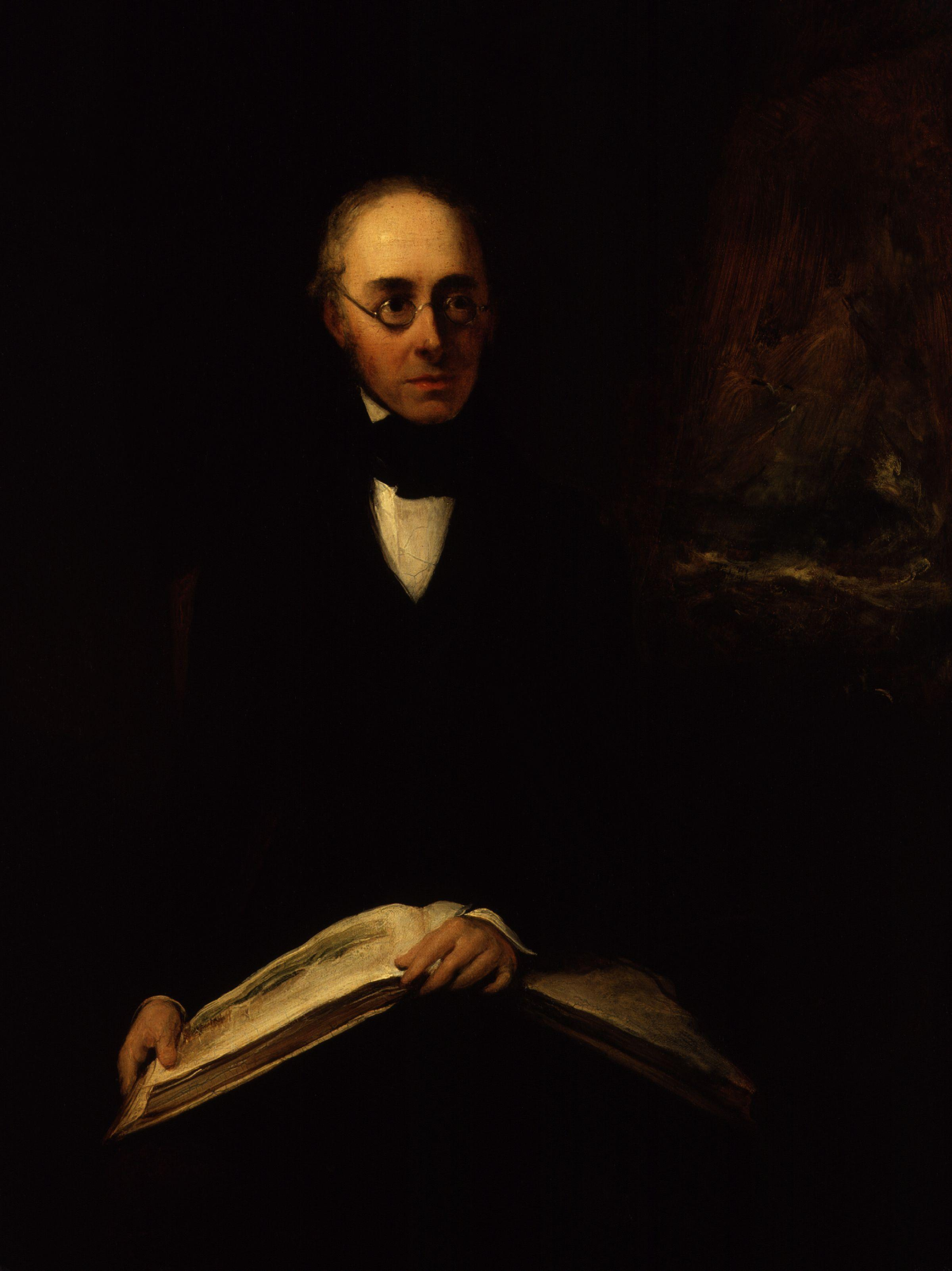
Antony Vandyke Copley Fielding by William Boxall, exhibited 1843

- Mick Farren, novelist, one-time writer of the New Musical Express and organiser of the Phun City music festival, grew up in Worthing and attended St Andrew's School.
- Anthony Copley Fielding, watercolour painter, lived at Park Crescent from 1847 until he died in 1855.
- John Fleming, trance producer and DJ is from Worthing.
- John Flett (1963–1991), internationally recognised fashion designer lived in the town and studied at Northbrook College.
- George Forbes, electrical engineer, astronomer, explorer, author and inventor lived in the town.
- **John Forbes Robertson**, actor, was born in Worthing in 1928
- Bill Fraser, actor, ran the Connaught Theatre in Worthing

== G ==
- **Stanley Gill**, computer scientist, was born in Worthing in 1926 and is co-credited with the invention of the first computer subroutine
- **Patrick Gordon Walker**, Labour Member of Parliament for Smethwick, was born in Worthing in 1907.
- **Francis Gresson**, cricketer who played for Oxford University and Sussex, was born in Worthing in 1868.
- **Sir Edward Guilford**, Lord Warden of the Cinque Ports, was born in Offington in the town around 1474.
- **Paul Gordon**, Author, Magician, Entertainer and Singer, has lived in Worthing since 1987.

== H ==
- Patrick Hadley, English composer. Went to Saint Ronan's School West Worthing.
- Beatrice Hastings, writer, poet and literary critic, moved to the town in the 1930s and publishing two books in the town.
- **Harry Hay**, American gay rights activist, was born in Worthing in 1912 before emigrating with his parents to the United States.
- Francesca Hayward, ballet dancer and winner of 2010 Young British Dancer of the Year grew up in Worthing.
- William Ernest Henley, poet, lived in Chesswood Road between 1899 and 1901.
- **Edward Henty**, pioneer, was born in Tarring in 1810.
- **Francis Henty**, early settler of Australia, was born at Field Place in 1815.
- **James Henty**, Australian pioneer, merchant and politician, was born in Tarring in 1800.
- **Stephen Henty**, farmer and politician, was born in Tarring in 1811.
- **William Henty**, was born in Tarring in 1808 and is best known for having bowled the first ever ball in a first class cricket match in Australia
- **Christopher Hewett**, actor best known for the role of the butler Lynn Belvedere on the sitcom Mr. Belvedere, was born in Worthing in 1921.
- Jamie Hewlett, a British comic book artist and designer, lived in Worthing.
- **William Horwood**, commissioner of the Metropolitan Police, was born in Broadwater in 1868.
- **Ken Howard**, songwriter, lyricist and author, was born in Worthing.
- William Henry Hudson, author and naturalist, lived in the town.
- Niall Hone, the bassist of psychedelic rock band Hawkwind, lived in the town.
- Mark Hughes, personality DJ that worked at Sterns Nightclub in the early 1990s
- **Douglas Hyde**, author, was born in Worthing in 1911.

== I ==
- Billy Idol, musician, grew up on the Goring Hall estate housing area in Goring, on Falmer Avenue.

== J ==
- David Jacobs, broadcaster
- M.E.Clifton James, actor, retired to Worthing
- Richard Jefferies, author and naturalist spent the last 10 months of his life living in Goring
- Lisa John, ten-pin bowler and member of the England National Team 1997 – 2003, lives in Worthing
- **Mickey Jupp**, musician, was born in Worthing in 1944.

== K ==
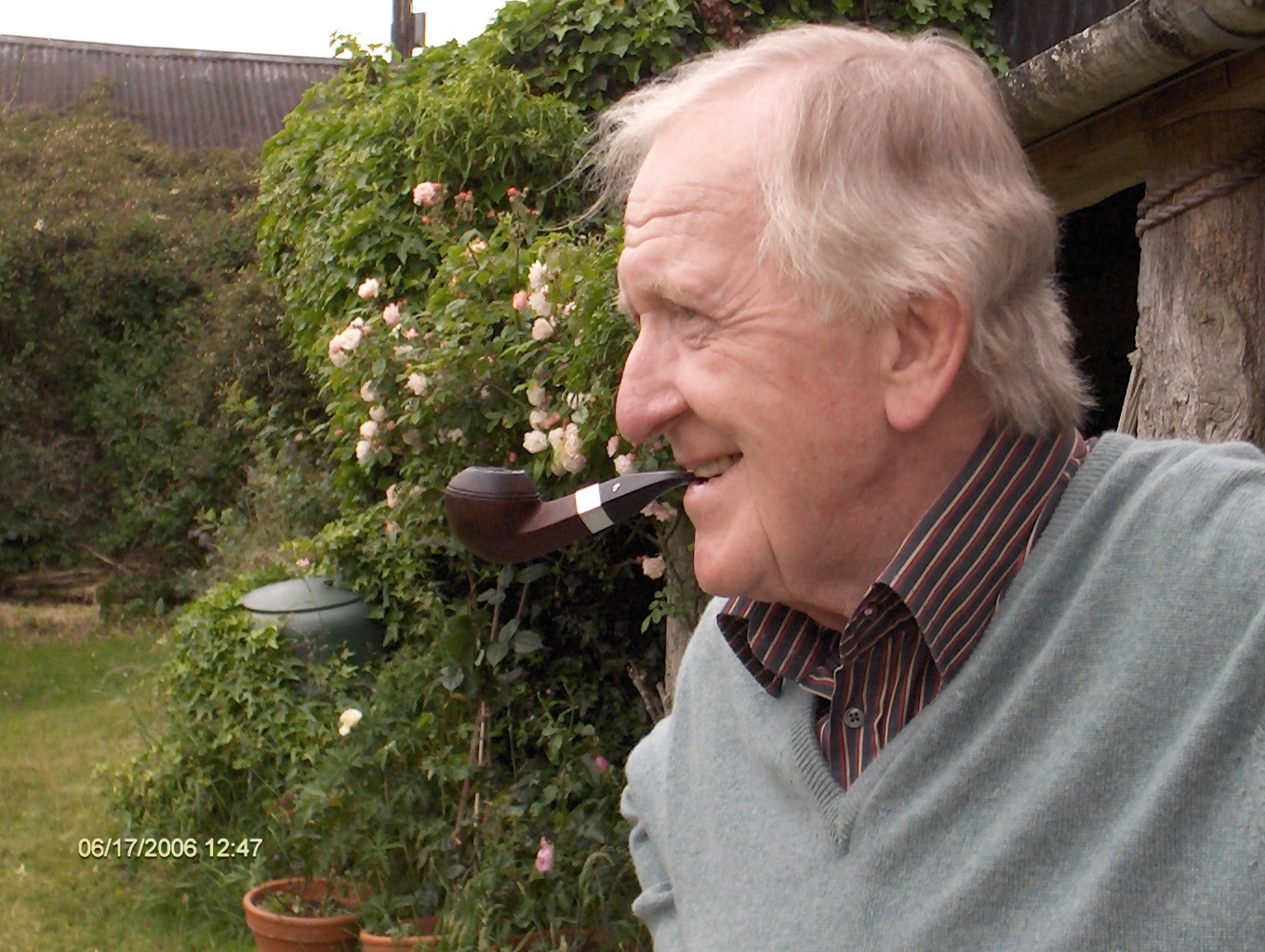
P. J. Kavanagh

- **P.J. Kavanagh**, poet, actor and journalist, was born in Worthing in 1931.
- **Kashy Keegan**, singer-songwriter, was born in Worthing in 1983.
- **Nicky Keig-Shevlin**, radio broadcaster, was born in Worthing in 1965.
- Mike Kerr, singer and bass guitarist for Mercury Prize-nominees Royal Blood, is from Worthing
- Edward Knoblock, US-born playwright and author bought and lived in Beach House from 1917.

== L ==
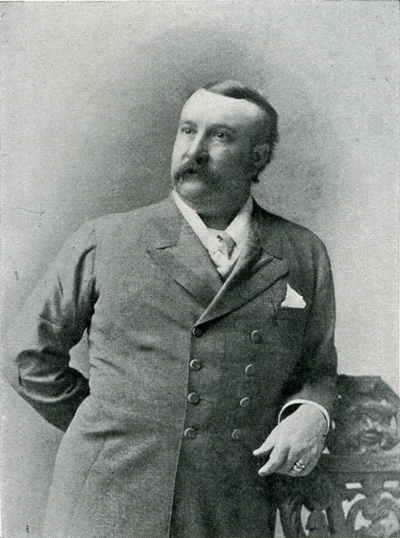
Edward Lloyd

- **Richard Landon**, footballer with Plymouth Argyle, was born in Worthing in 1970
- Edward William Lane, translator of The Thousand and One Nights (Arabian Nights) from Arabic, lived at 4 Union Place in the town.
- Alison Lapper, Artist and sculptor lives in Worthing
- **Bruno Lawrence**, musician and actor, was born in Worthing and lived in the town as a child until his family emigrated to New Zealand.
- David Leadbetter, golf instructor, is originally from Worthing.
- **Neil Lenham**, cricketer, was born and grew up in Worthing.
- Damian Le Bas, artist, lives in the town.
- Martin Lee, former Great Britain Davis Cup player, is from Worthing.
- **Anna Lewis (suffragette)**, British suffragette, recipient of Hunger Strike Medal in 1914
- **Jason Lewry**, Sussex cricketer and member of Sussex's County Championship-winning sides of 2003, 2006 and 2007, was born in the town in 1971 and grew up in the Tarring area of Worthing.
- **Jennie Linden**, actress, was born in the town in 1939.
- Edward Lloyd, tenor, lived in Worthing until his death in 1927.
- Hugh Lloyd, actor, lived in the town, until his death in 2008.
- Sir Edmund Loder, gardener and owner of Leonardslee Gardens in Lower Beeding lived at Beach House.
- Sir Robert Loder, scientific farmer, with estates in England, Russia and Sweden and MP for New Shoreham lived at Beach House.

== M ==
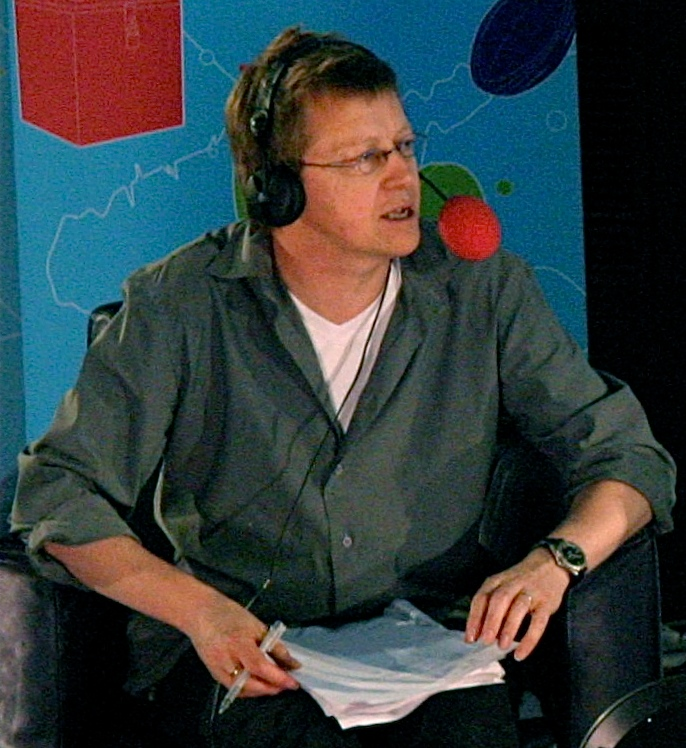
Simon Mayo

- **Robert Gwyn Macfarlane**, haematologist, was born in Worthing in 1907.
- **Basil Malcolm**, cricketer for Bengal, was born in Worthing in 1912
- **Alan Mann**, founder of motor racing team Alan Mann Racing, was born in Worthing in 1936.
- Reginald Marsh, actor and star of Coronation Street in the 1960s and 1970s, grew up in Worthing.
- Alan Martin, comic creator and writer, was born in Worthing.
- Charlotte Mason was a well-known educator who taught at Davison School in Worthing for more than ten years in the 1800s.
- Simon Mayo, Radio/TV presenter, attended Worthing High School, sold suits at Burtons The Tailors, and worked for the local council as a paddling pool attendant, a car park attendant and a tennis court attendant.
- **David McAlister**, actor, was born in Worthing in 1951.
- David McGhee, footballer who played for clubs including Brentford and Leyton Orient.
- Roxanne McKee, actress in the Hollyoaks series, grew up in Worthing and went to school at Our Lady of Sion School.
- Vivien Merchant, actress, lived in Ambrose Place from 1963 to 1964 with her then husband, playwright Harold Pinter.
- **Frederick George Miles**, aircraft designer and manufacturer, was born in the town in 1903 and died in the town in 1976.
- Bob Monkhouse, comedian, moved to Worthing in 1939, attending school at Goring Hall in Goring.
- **Montague Shadworth Seymour Moore**, recipient of the Victoria Cross, was born in Worthing in 1896.
- **Elizabeth Moody**, New Zealand actress and director, was born in Worthing in 1939.
- Gladys Morgan, Welsh comedian, was a resident for 47 years.

== N ==
- **Duncan Neale**, footballer who played for Newcastle United and Plymouth Argyle was born in Worthing in 1939.
- Derren Nesbitt, actor
- Wilfred Noy, film director lived in Worthing until his death in 1948.

== O ==
- **Brenock O'Connor**, actor, was born in Worthing and went to school in Goring.
- John Oxenham (real name William Arthur Dunkerley), novelist, poet and journalist, lived in Farncombe Road in the town.
- Elsie J. Oxenham (real name Elsie Jeanette Dunkerley), children's author, lived in Farncombe Road in the town.

== P ==
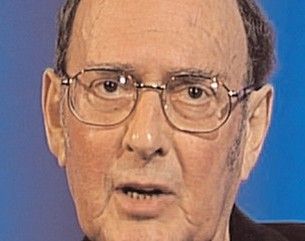
Harold Pinter

- **Eric Parsons**, footballer was born in Worthing in 1923 and lived locally until his passing in 2010.
- **Cecil Pashley**, aviation pioneer, was born in Worthing in 1891.
- Jasper Pattenden, professional footballer
- Harold Pinter, Nobel Prize-winning playwright and screenwriter, lived in Ambrose Place in the town in the 1960s with his first wife, the actress Vivien Merchant.
- **Alex Preston** novelist, is from Worthing.
- **Samuel Preston** (known simply as "Preston"), lead singer and guitarist with The Ordinary Boys, is originally from Worthing
- Gwyneth Powell, actress, lived in Ashdown Road, Worthing.
- Katie Price, glamour model, owns a house in Goring-by-Sea.
- Nancy Price, actress, lived in the High Salvington area of Worthing.
- Luke Pritchard, lead singer and rhythm guitarist of indie band The Kooks was born in Worthing in 1983.

== R ==
- **Harrison Reed**, footballer, was born in the town in 1995.
- **David Remfry**, artist, was born in Worthing in 1942.
- **John Richardson**, actor, best known for his role in the film One Million Years B.C. (1966) was born in Worthing in 1934.
- **Lucy Robinson**, actress, was born in Worthing in 1968.
- Michel Emmanuel Rodocanachi, trader and banker, lived at Chios in West Worthing.
- Talbot Rothwell, screenwriter who wrote many of the Carry On films, moved to Worthing from Fulking in the late 1970s.
- **Michael Rushton**, drummer was born in Worthing in 1950.

== S ==
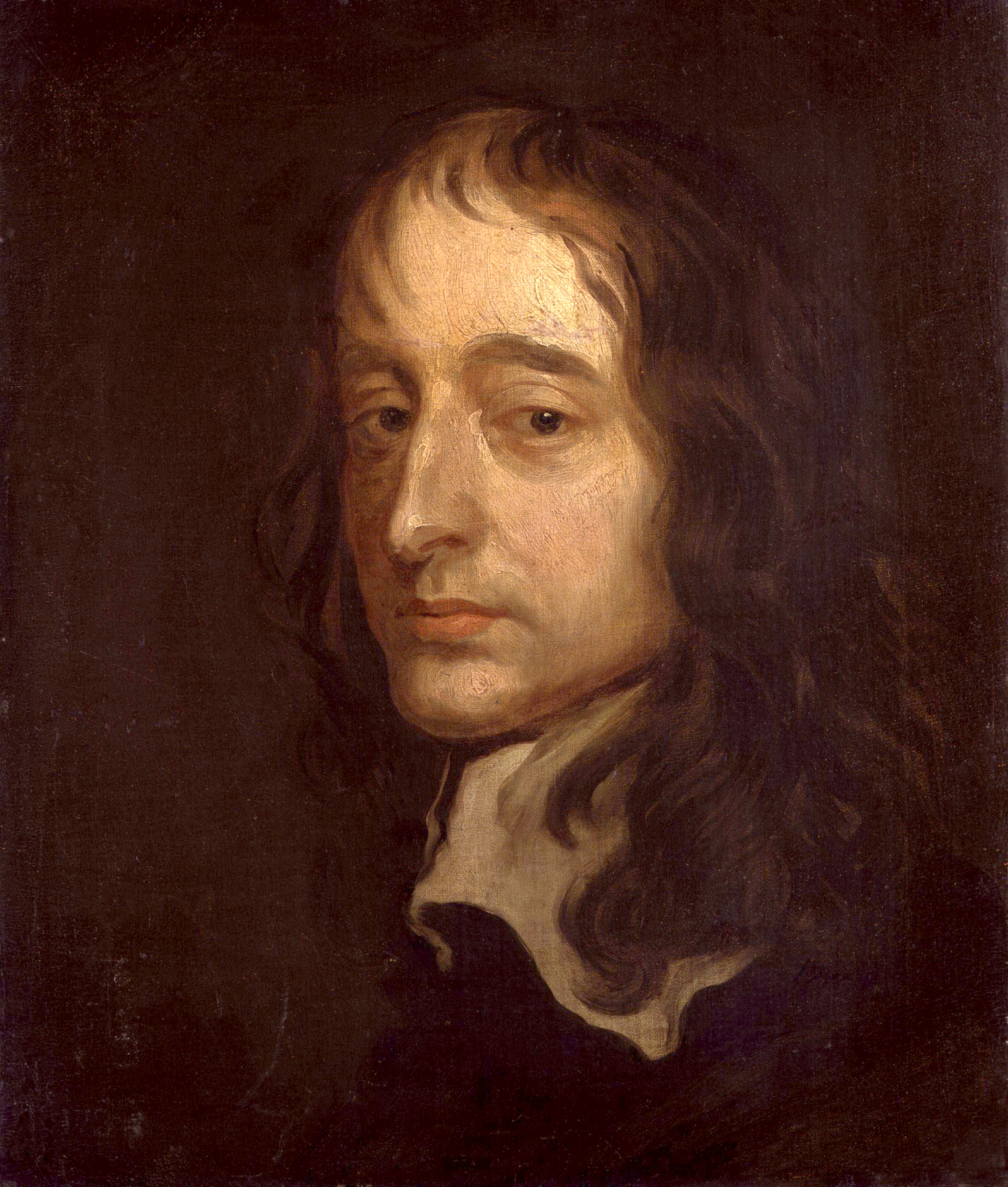
John Selden

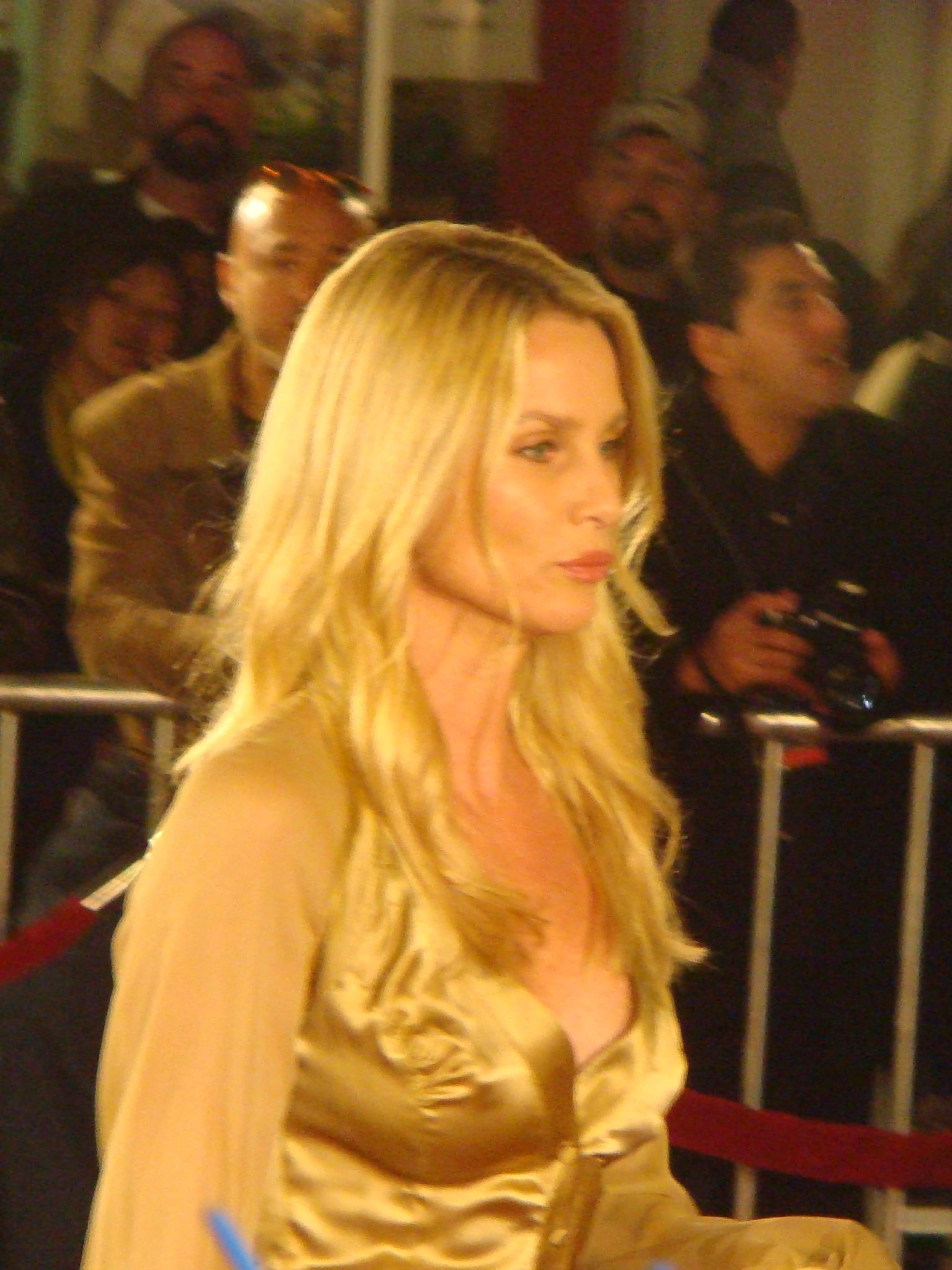
Nicollette Sheridan

- Carl Adolf Seebold, impresario, lived in Worthing, first at Bedford House and later at 52 Richmond Road.
- **John Selden**, jurist, legal antiquary and oriental scholar was born in Salvington in Worthing in 1584.
- **Derek Semmence**, cricketer, was born in the town in 1938.
- **Nicollette Sheridan**, American television actress, was born in the town in 1963.
- **David Sims**, biologist, was born in Worthing in 1969.
- John Sims Reeves, opera singer, lived in Worthing until his death in 1900.
- **James Anderson Slater**, First World War flying ace, was born in Worthing in 1896.
- **Donald Smith**, former Test cricketer, was born in Broadwater in 1923.
- Arthur Somerset, former Worthing, Sussex and London cricketer, who lived at Castle Goring.
- Stephen Spender, poet, attended Charlecote School in Byron Road, West Worthing for a year from 1920 to 1921.
- **Sally-Anne Stapleford**, skater, was born in Worthing.
- Sir Frederick Stern, gardener and creator of Highdown Gardens, lived at Highdown Towers in Goring.
- Ken Suttle, Sussex cricketer and footballer with Brighton and Hove Albion, lived in Worthing.

== T ==
- Ann Thwaytes, philanthropist lived at Charmandean, Charmandean Lane, Broadwater until her death in 1866
- **Alfred Tidey**, miniature-painter, was born in Worthing in 1808
- **Henry Tidey**, watercolourist, was born in Worthing in 1814.
- Actor Peter Tuddenham moved to Worthing in 1961 and lived in Brooklyn Avenue, West Worthing and Portland Road in the town centre until his death in 2007. Tuddenham is best known for his roles in cult television dramas Doctor Who and Blake's 7.
- **Eric Thornton**, Belgium international footballer and Olympic medallist, was born in Worthing in 1882
- **Edward Tupper**, trade unionist, was born in Worthing in 1872

== W ==
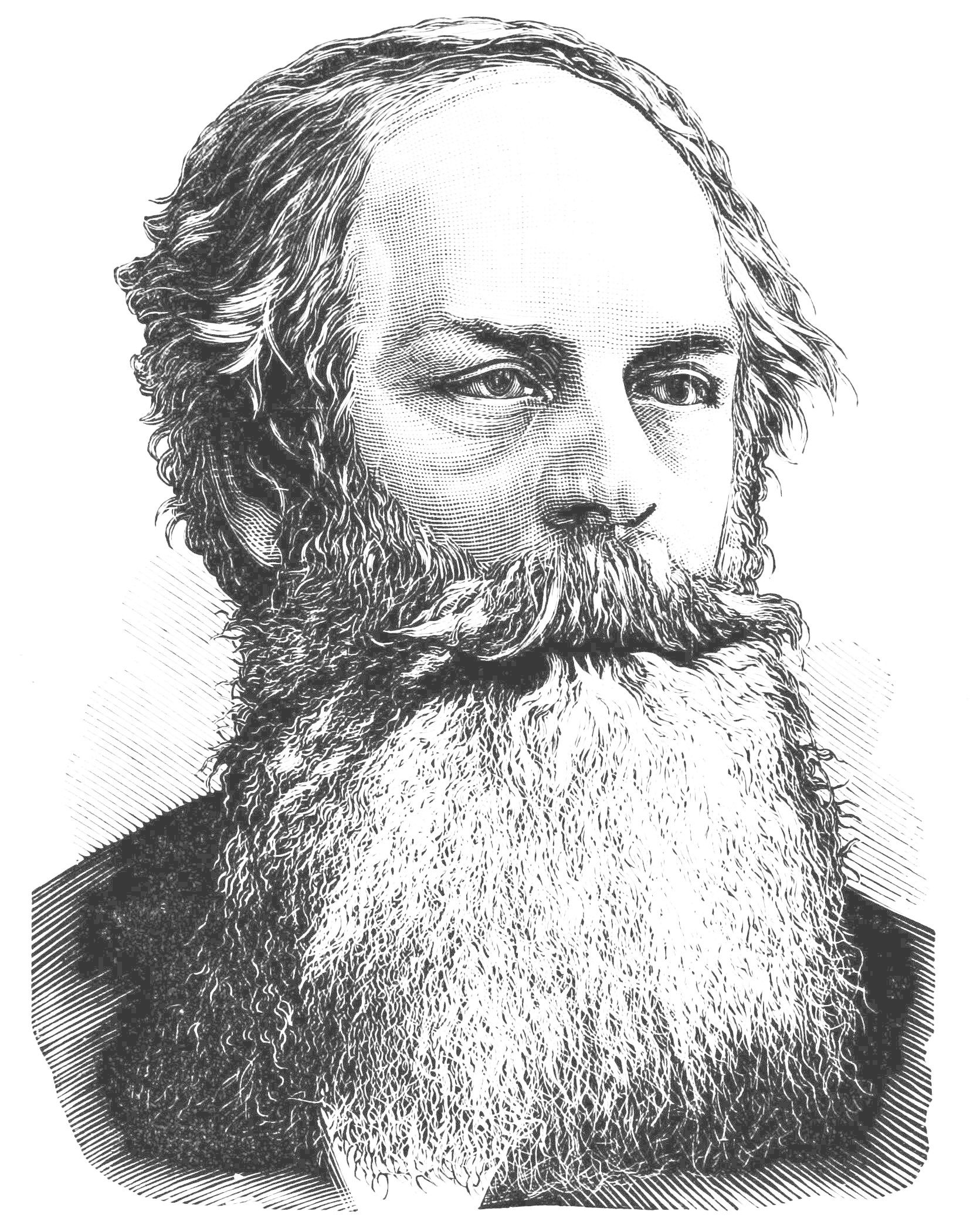
John Turtle Wood

- **Charlie Wakefield**, footballer with Coventry City was born in Worthing in 1998.
- Alan Warren (sailor) Olympic Silver Medalist lives in Worthing.
- James Warwick. Born 1947. TV, Film and stage actor and director.
- Charlie Webb, football player, grew up in Worthing
- Thomas West, 8th Baron De La Warr lived in Offington and is buried at Broadwater Church.
- John White, surgeon, lived in Worthing and is buried in the churchyard of St Mary's Church in Broadwater.
- Ruth Wignall, journalist and broadcaster for ITV Cymru Wales, was born in Worthing in 1975
- **Peter Wight**, actor, was born in Worthing
- **Gary Willard**, former football referee was born in Worthing in 1959. He officiated in the Football League and the Premier League, and for FIFA.
- Charles Williams, composer, lived in the Findon Valley area of Worthing.
- **Robert Wilson**, Anglican priest, was born in Worthing in 1840
- John Turtle Wood, architect, engineer and archaeologist lived on Marine Parade and is buried in Christ Church in the town centre.
- **Barbara Wright**, translator of modern French literature, was born in the town in 1915.

== Y ==
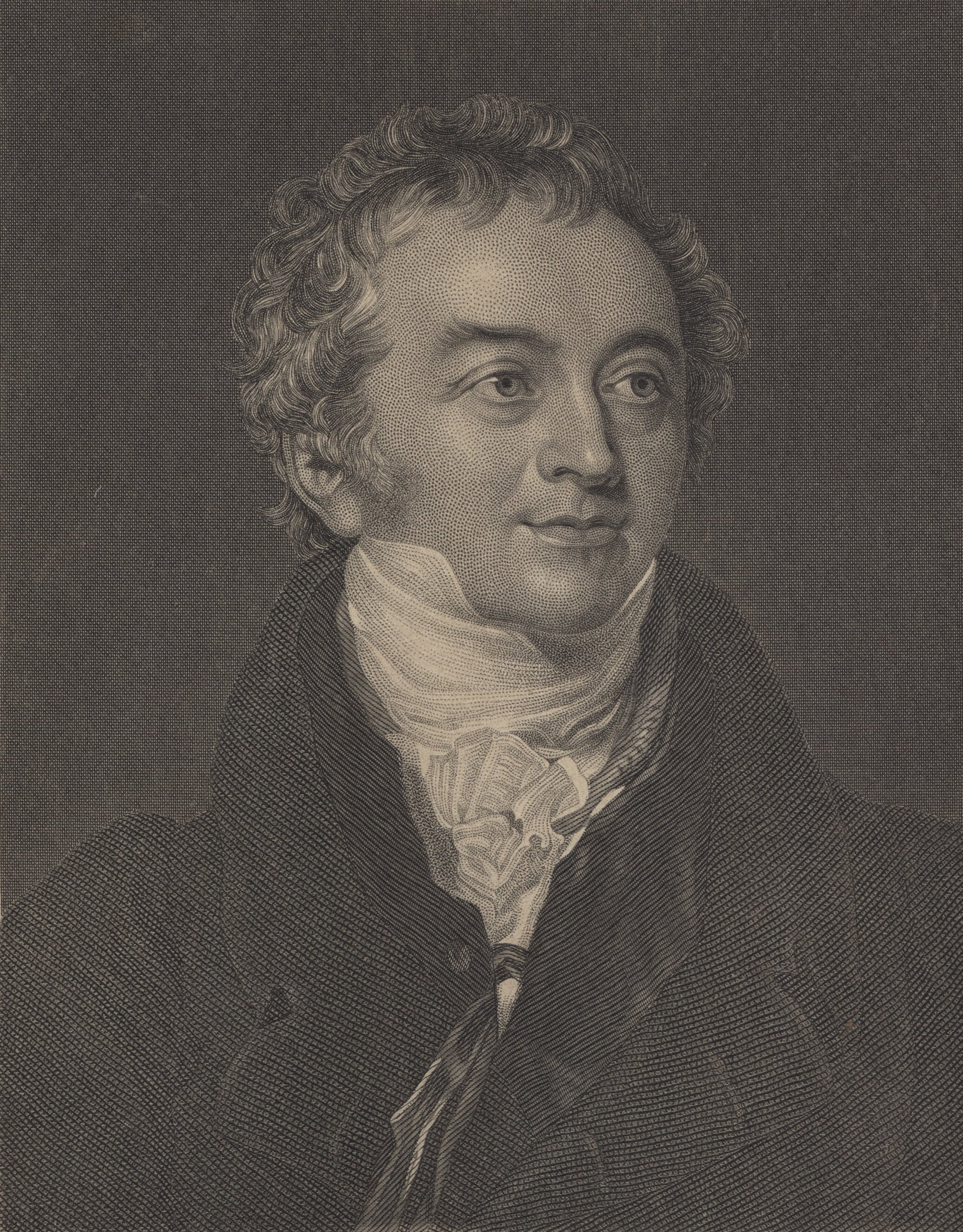
Thomas Young

- **Brian Yeo**, footballer, was born in the town in 1950.
- Thomas Young, polymath and translator of the Rosetta Stone

== See also ==
- List of people from Sussex
