= List of people from Hastings =

This is a list of notable people who have been or are associated with Hastings and St Leonards-on-Sea. This list is arranged alphabetically by surname:

== A ==
- Queen Adelaide (1792–1849), consort of William IV. Lived in St Leonards as a widow.
- Maggie Alderson (born 1959), author, magazine editor and fashion journalist, lives in Hastings.
- Herbert Antcliffe (1875–1964) musicologist, lived at 111 London Road, St Leonards on Sea after World War II.
- John Armstrong (1893–1973), painter of imaginative subjects, designer of film and stage sets, mural painter and book illustrator. Born in Hastings
- Jeremy Atherton Lin (born 1974), writer, lives in St Leonards-on-Sea.
- Prince Augustus Frederick, Duke of Sussex (1773–1843), son of George III. Lived in Hastings at some time.
- Lieutenant-General Sir Fenton Aylmer, 13th Baronet (1862–1935), awarded the Victoria Cross in 1891 the Hunza–Nagar Campaign, India. Born in Hastings.

== B ==
- John Logie Baird (1888–1946), lived in Hastings in the 1920s where he carried out experiments that led to the transmission of the first television image.
- Kevin Ball (born 1964), ex-footballer and coach at Sunderland A.F.C., played in 1992 FA Cup. Born in Hastings.
- Gillian Barge (1940–2003), stage, television and film actress. Born Gillian Bargh in Hastings.
- Gareth Barry (born 1981), footballer, latterly at Everton F.C., played in 2011 FA Cup Final and for England. Born in Hastings.
- Andy Bell (born 1964), singer in 80s band Erasure, lived in Hastings from 2009.
- Harold Bennett (1899–1981) actor (Young Mr Grace). Born in 1899 in Hastings.
- Mark Benton (born 1965) TV and stage actor. Lives in Hastings.
- James Blackshaw (born 1981) musician, principally with acoustic 12-string guitar. Based in Hastings.
- Elizabeth Blackwell (1821–1910), first woman to qualify as a doctor. Lived in Hastings from 1879 until her death in 1910.
- Euphemia Vale Blake (1817–1904), author, critic
- Emma Blocksage (born 1979) (Emma B), model turned bodybuilder. Born in Hastings.
- Barbara Bodichon (1827–1890), advocate of women's rights, painter and founder of Girton College. Spent her childhood in Hastings and retained connections through her life
- Elsie Bowerman (1889–1973), suffragette, RMS Titanic survivor, and early female barrister. Her parents lived and worked in Hastings and St Leonards; she was raised, campaigned and lived there at various times.
- Darren Boyd (born 1971), actor. Born in Hastings.
- Jo Brand (born 1957), comedian. Brought up and educated in 6th Form in Hastings.
- Thomas Brassey (1805–1870), railway pioneer ("the greatest railway builder in the world"), father of Earl Brassey. Lived and died in St Leonards.
- Thomas Brassey, 1st Earl Brassey (1836–1918), politician and Governor of Victoria. MP for Hastings 1868–1888. Son of Thomas.
- John Bratby (1928–1992), artist of the "kitchen sink school". Lived and died in Hastings.
- George Bristow (1863–1947), St Leonards-on-Sea taxidermist at centre of the Hastings Rarities ornithology fraud.
- Jimmy Broadbent (born 1991), racing driver, content creator, sim racer and e-sports commentator. Born and grew up in Hastings.
- Dr Gerald Brodribb (1915–1999), cricket historian, author and archaeologist. Born in St Leonards-on-Sea and owned Hydneye House school in Hastings.
- Nikki Bull (born 1981), footballer. Born and brought up in Hastings.
- Shayne Burgess (born 1964), darts player known as Bulldog. Born and lives in Hastings.
- Edward Burra (1905–1976), painter, draughtsman, and printmaker. Lived and died in Hastings.
- Moss Burmester (born 1981), New Zealand professional swimmer. Competed in 2008 Summer Olympics in the Men's 200m Butterfly against famous American Swimmer Michael Phelps and came in 4th place with a New Zealand record breaking time of 1:54:35. Born and raised in Hastings
- Paul Burston (born 1965), author and journalist. Lives in Hastings. Burston's 2019 novel, The Closer I Get, is partly set in the town.
- Amanda Burton (born 1956), actress. Lives in Hastings.
- James Burton (1761–1837), builder and developer, founder of the new seaside town of St Leonards-on-Sea.
- Decimus Burton (1800–1881), son of James Burton, architect and garden designer, continued his father's work.

== C ==
- Edward Capell (1713–1781). Shakespearian critic and censor of plays. Lived in Hastings.
- Thomas Carlyle (1795–1881), man of letters. Lived at 117 Marina in the summer of 1864, in order to be near his ailing wife Jane Carlyle, who was in possession of caretakers.
- Liane Carroll (born 1964), jazz musician, pianist, vocalist. Raised and lives in Hastings.
- Richard D'Oyly Carte (1844–1901), founder of the Savoy Theatre, Savoy Hotel, and D'Oyly Carte Opera Company. Mother lived in Hastings, he is buried at Fairlight.
- Tom Chaplin (born 1979), lead vocalist of rock band Keane. Born in Hastings with many connections to the local area (or Strangeland ).
- George Chapman (1865–1903) (Seweryn Klosowski) murderer, Jack the Ripper suspect. Lived and worked (and murdered) for a time in Hastings.
- Stuart Christie (born 1946), anarchist writer, publisher, would-be assassin of Franco. Lives and works in Hastings.
- Queen Marie-Louise Christophe (née Coidavid) (1778 - 1851), the first and only Queen of Haiti lived in Hastings at what is now 5 Exmouth Place.
- Shirley Collins (born 1935), English folk singer. Born and raised in Hastings.
- Steve Cook (born 1991), footballer. Lives in St Leonards.
- Dame Catherine Cookson (1906–1998), popular novelist. Lived and worked for much of her life in Hastings.
- Anthony Crosland (1918–1977), Labour politician, government minister. Born in St Leonards.
- Rob Cross (born 1990), PDC World Darts Champion. Lives in Hastings.
- Aleister Crowley (1875–1947), occultist, philosopher. Went to school, lived for some time, and died in Hastings.

== D ==
- Mark Davis (born 1972), champion snooker player. Lives in Hastings.
- Martin Degville (born 1961), Sigue Sigue Sputnik singer and writer. Lives and works in St Leonards and Hastings.
- Paul Denman (born 1957), songwriter and bass guitarist with the band Sade. Lives in St Leonards with his fashion designer wife Kim Denman.
- Eugénie de Montijo (1826–1920), 16th Countess of Teba and 15th Marchioness of Ardales, the last Empress consort of the French. Stayed in Hastings as a refugee.
- George Digweed (born 1964), World and European English sport shooter clay-shooting champion. Born in Hastings.
- John Digweed (born 1967), DJ, record producer and actor. Born in Hastings.
- Tymon Dogg (Stephen John Murray) (born 1950) singer-songwriter, musician. Lives in Hastings.
- Barry Dransfield (living), folk singer, fiddler, cellist and guitarist. Lives and works in Hastings.
- Sir Alfred Dyer (1865–1947), journalist, chief executive, and Conservative Party politician. Lived in Hastings and died in St Leonards.

== E ==
- Elizabeth Eiloart (1827–1898), novelist (as Mrs C. J. Eiloart), feminist and suffragist. Retired to St Leonards.
- Ernest Elmore (1901–1957), theatre producer, director, writer (as "John Bude"). Died in Hastings.
- Maya Evans (born 1979), political activist, peace campaigner. From Hastings.

== F ==
- Jo Fairley (born 1956), journalist, entrepreneur and co-founder of Green & Black's. Lives in Hastings Old Town.
- Karl Ferris (born 1948), photographer, including album covers for Jimi Hendrix, Donovan and The Hollies. Born and grew up in Hastings.
- Jon Finch (1942−2012), actor. Lived in Hastings towards the end of his life.
- Michael Foster (born 1946), politician, government minister, MP for Hastings & Rye 1997–2010. Born, lives, works in Hastings.
- Myra Frances (1942–2021), actress. Born in Hastings.
- Kim Fuller (born 1951), television, film and radio writer and producer. Brother of Simon Fuller. Born in Hastings.
- Simon Fuller (born 1960), music and celebrity manager (e.g. The Spice Girls), TV producer, created Idols (TV series). Born and brought up in Hastings.
- Harry Furniss (1854–1925), caricaturist and Punch cartoonist. Lived and worked in Hastings Old Town towards the end of his life.
- Steve Furst (born 1967), comedian and actor. Lived in St Leonards.

== G ==
- David Gemmell (1946–2006), novelist. Lived and died in Hastings.
- Mary Gentle (born 1956), science fiction and fantasy author. Went to school and lived in Hastings.
- Adrian Gray (born 1981), international darts player. Based in St Leonards.
- William Alexander Greenhill (1814–1896), doctor, literary editor and sanitary reformer. Lived and practiced in Hastings and St Leonards.

== H ==
- Sid Hadden (1877–1934), cricketer. Born in Hastings.
- Henry Rider Haggard (1865–1936), writer. Lived and wrote in St Leonards 1917–1923.
- Claire Hamill (born 1954), singer-songwriter. Lives in Hastings.
- Dean Hammond (born 1983), footballer. Born in Hastings.
- John Wesley Harding (born 1965) (Wesley Stace), singer-songwriter and author. Born in Hastings.
- David Hare (born 1947), playwright, screenwriter and theatre and film director. Born in St Leonards.
- John Holmes (1924–1980), cricketer. Born in Hastings.
- Richard Hughes (born 1975), drummer of the rock band Keane which was formed in Hastings and Battle.

== J ==
- Andrew Jefford (born 1956), journalist, radio presenter, poet, magazine editor, wine writer. Lives in Hastings.
- Sophia Jex-Blake (1840–1912), feminist and founder of the London School of Medicine for Women. Born in Hastings.
- Houn Jiyu-Kennett (1924–1996) (Peggy Teresa Nancy Kennett), Rōshi (Zen Buddhist teacher). Born in St Leonards.
- Thomas H. Jukes (1906–1999), biologist known for nutrition, molecular evolution, and public engagement with controversial scientific issues. Born in Hastings.

== K ==
- Sheila Kaye-Smith (1881–1956), author. Born, lived and worked in St Leonards.
- Leigh Kennedy (born 1951), writer. Lives in Hastings.
- Steve Kinch (living), bass guitarist with Manfred Mann's Earth Band. Lives in Hastings.
- Jules Knight (born 1981) (Julian Kaye), singer, actor. Born and raised in Hastings.

== L ==
- Anne Lister (3 April 1791 – 22 September 1840), resided in 15 Pelham Crescent in the early 1820s for a short period before returning to Shibden Hall, Halifax.
- Alex Lester (born 1956), BBC Radio 2 presenter. Lives in St Leonards.
- Peter Ling (1926–2006), writer and creator of Crossroads. Lived and worked in Hastings.
- Jamie Lloyd (born 1980), theatre director. Lives in Hastings.
- Geoff Love (1917–1991), band leader and composer. Worked on Hastings Pier in the 1930s.
- Johann Löwenthal (1810–1876), professional chess master. Died in St Leonards.
- Anders Lustgarten (born 1977), playwright. Lives in Hastings.
- Mary Elizabeth Southwell Dudley Leathley (1818– 1899), writer, lived in Hastings until her death in 1899.

== M ==
- George MacDonald (1824–1905), children's writer. Lived in Hastings.
- Doon Mackichan (born 1962), actress and comedian. Lives in Hastings.
- Clark Masters (born 1987), football goalkeeper. Born in Hastings.
- Ernest R. Matthews (1873−1930), expert on coastal erosion, born in Hastings.
- Simon Mawer (born 1948), novelist. Has a house in Hastings Old Town.
- Maria McErlane (born 1957), actress, radio and TV presenter. Lives in Hastings and London
- Spike Milligan (1918–2002), comedian and writer. Served in Bexhill area in WW2 and later lived in Rye.
- George Mogridge (Old Humphrey) (1787–1854), writer, poet and author of children's books and religious tracts. Lived in Hastings until his death.
- George Monger (1840–1887), awarded the Victoria Cross, aged 17, at the Siege of Lucknow. Lived and died in Hastings.
- Charles Moore (born 1956) Journalist. Born in Hastings
- General James Murray (1721–1794), distinguished British soldier, Governor of Quebec. Lived in Hastings, built Beauport Park.

== N ==
- Marianne North (1830–1890), botanical painter with permanent gallery at Kew Gardens, London. Born in Hastings.
- Claude Nunney (1892–1918), Canadian soldier, recipient of the Victoria Cross. Born in Hastings.

== O ==
- Titus Oates (1649–1705), instigator of the "Popish Plot". Lived in Hastings when his father was Curate of All Saints.
- Jane Omorogbe (born 1971), actress, TV presenter, journalist. Brought up in Hastings.
- Grey Owl (Archibald Belaney) (1888–1938), author, nature conservation pioneer, and Canadian icon. Born in Hastings.

== P ==
- Sir Woodbine Parish (1796–1882), diplomat, traveller and scientist. Lived in St Leonards.
- Cecil Parker (Cecil Schwabe) (1897–1971), actor. Born in Hastings.
- Coventry Patmore (1823–1896), poet and critic. Lived in Hastings.
- Sergiusz Piasecki (1901?–1964), best-selling author in Poland. Lived in St Leonards.
- William Thomas Pike (1838–1924), publisher, journalist, writer, editor. Born in St Leonards, lived for some years in Hastings.
- Fiona Pitt-Kethley (born 1954), poet, novelist, travel writer and journalist. Lived in Hastings for many years.
- Poly Styrene (1957–2011) of X-Ray Spex. Lived in St Leonards.
- Professor Roy Porter (1946–2002), historian of medicine and psychiatry. Retired to St Leonards.
- Christopher Priest (born 1943), novelist. Lived in Hastings.

== Q ==
- David Quantick, novelist, comedy writer and critic. Lives in Hastings.

== R ==
- Milan Rai (living), political activist. Lives in Hastings.
- Rainier III, Prince of Monaco (1923–2005), went to school at Summerfields, St Leonards-on-Sea.
- Thomas Rendle (born 1986), international chess master. Born and brought up in Hastings.
- Tim Rice-Oxley (born 1976), pianist and songwriter of the rock band Keane. born and brought up in Hastings.
- Henry Handel Richardson (Ethel Florence Lindesay Richardson) (1870–1946), author. Died in Hastings.
- Lee Richardson (1979–2012), speedway rider. Born in Hastings.
- Dante Gabriel Rossetti (1828–1882), poet, illustrator, painter and translator. Lodged, worked and was married in Hastings.
- Amber Rudd (born 1963), former MP for Hastings and Rye 2010-2019. Lived on Tackleway, Hastings.
- Neil Ruddock (born 1968), ex-footballer, actor. Lived in Hastings.

== S ==
- Craig Sams (born 1944), co-founder of Green & Black's. Lives in Hastings Old Town.
- Alex Sanders (Orrell Alexander Carter, "Verbius") (1926–1988). "King of the Witches". Lived in Hastings.
- Edward Sargent (1842–1914) American architect. Born in Hastings.
- Malcolm Saville (1901–1982), author of children's books. Born in Hastings.
- Paul Smith (born 1976), footballer. Born in Hastings.
- Thomas Henry Sparshott (1841–1927), Anglican priest and missionary, retired to Hastings and died there.
- Suggs (Graham McPherson) (born 1961), lead singer of Madness. Born and brought up in Hastings.
- Screaming Lord Sutch (1940–1999), founder of the Monster Raving Loony Party. Lived in Hastings.

== T ==
- Bernard J. Taylor. Composed a number of his works whilst resident in Hastings.
- David Teacher (1923–2024), RAF veteran from World War II
- Pierre Teilhard de Chardin (1881–1955), French theologian, writer and philosopher. Studied in Hastings.
- David Tibet (David Michael Bunting) (born 1960), poet, artist and musician. Lives in Hastings.
- Claud B. Ticehurst (1881–1941), ornithologist. Born in St Leonards.
- Tulsen Tollett (born 1973), rugby league player. Born in Hastings.
- Robert Tressell (Robert Noonan) (1870–1911), author of The Ragged-Trousered Philanthropists set in Mugsborough (Hastings). Lived and worked in Hastings.
- Alan Turing (1912–1954), pioneering computer scientist. Lived at Baston Lodge in St Leonards in his youth.
- Tony Tyler (James Edward Anthony Tyler) (1943–2006), author, writer on computer topics and for NME. Lived in Hastings until his death.

== U ==
- Barry Upton (born 1954) musician, songwriter, producer. Born in Hastings.

== W ==
- Trevor Watts (b1939), free jazz saxophonist. Resident in Hastings
- Winifred Wagner (1897–1980), manager of Bayreuth Festival 1930–1945. Born in Hastings.
- Sarah Waldegrave, Countess Waldegrave (Sarah Whiter) (1787–1873), philanthropist. Born and lived in Hastings, benefactor to several local institutions.
- Thomas Attwood Walmisley (1814–1856), organist, Professor of Music at Cambridge. Lived in Hastings (Fairlight).
- Alexia Walker (born 1982), cricketer. Born in St Leonards.
- Dr Nathaniel Bagshaw Ward (1791–1868), doctor, botanist, inventor. Died in St Leonards.
- Matthew Waterhouse (born 1961), actor and writer. Lives in Hastings.
- Gwen Watford (1927–1994), film, stage and television actress. Brought up in Hastings.
- Paul Watson (born 1975), footballer. Born in Hastings.
- Field Marshal Arthur Wellesley, 1st Duke of Wellington (1 May 1769 – 14 September 1852) soldier, statesman, defeated Napoleon at the Battle of Waterloo in 1815, MP for Rye. Stationed in, and lived in Hastings at some time.
- Henning Wehn (born 1974) German comedian. Lives in St Leonards.
- Randall Wells (1877–1942), Arts and Crafts architect, craftsman and inventor. Partner with architect father Arthur Wells in Hastings.
- Anna McNeill Whistler (c. 1831–1881), Whistler's Mother. Lived and died in Hastings.
- Dean White (born 1958), footballer. Born in Hastings.
- (William) Hale White (1831–1913), novelist as Mark Rutherford. Lived in Hastings at some time.

== Y ==
- Mike Yardy (born 1980), cricketer, Sussex captain, played for England. Grew up in Hastings.
- Paula Yates (1959–2000), television presenter. Had a house in Hastings before she died in 2000.

== See also ==
- List of people from Sussex
