= List of people from Lewes =

Lewes is the county town of East Sussex, England. The following is a list of those people who were either born or live in Lewes, or had some important contribution to make to the town.

== A ==
- John Agard (born 1949), poet, playwright and children's author, lives in Lewes
- Russell Ash (1946–2010), author of Top 10 of Everything and other non-fiction books
- Daisy Ashford (1881–1972), juvenile novelist
- B. T. S. Atkins (1931–2021), lexicographer
- Lucy Atkins (Born 1968), novelist
- John Authers, financial journalist and writer

== B ==
- Marina Baker (born 1967), former actress/model, journalist, children's author and politician
- Norman Baker (born 1957), former Liberal Democrat MP for Lewes
- Wynne Edwin Baxter (1844–1920), lawyer, translator, antiquarian and botanist
- Honor Blackman (1925–2020), actor
- Asa Briggs (1921–2016), English Historian, second vice-chancellor of University of Sussex and created Baron Briggs of Lewes in 1976
- Michael Brooks (born 1970), science writer
- Arthur Brown (born 1942), musician, best known for his 1968 hit "Fire"
- Ralph Brown (born 1957), actor
- Anthony Buckeridge (1912–2004), children's author, noted for his Jennings series, lived near Lewes from 1962 until his death

== C ==
- Anna Campbell (1991-2018), first British woman to die fighting for the Women's Protection Units
- Philip Carr-Gomm (born 1952), leader of the Order of Bards, Ovates and Druids
- Richard Challoner (1691–1781), Roman Catholic bishop
- Thomas Cobham (died 1327), archdeacon of Lewes
- Shirley Collins (born 1935), folk singer and collector
- John Conolly (1794–1866), physician
- Henry William Crosskey (1826–1893), geologist and Unitarian minister

== D ==
- Nick Davies (born 1953), investigative journalist and author of Flat Earth News, uncovered the News of the World phone hacking affair
- Roger Dean (born 1944), artist
- Alice Dudeney (1866–1945), author and diarist
- Henry Dudeney (1857–1930), author and mathematician

== E ==
- John Ellman (1753–1832), farmer and stockbreeder
- John Evelyn (1620–1706), writer, gardener and diarist

== F ==
- Julian Fane (1927–2009), author
- Barry Fell (1917–1994), zoologist
- John Fitzalan, 1st Baron Arundel (c. 1348–1379)
- David Ford (born 1978), singer/songwriter
- Julia Foster (born 1943), actress

== G ==
- Eve Garnett (1900–1991), author and illustrator
- Walter Godfrey (1881–1961), architect, historian and antiquarian
- John Sparkes Goldsmith (1878–1942), founder and first editor of The Ringing World
- Sarah Gordy (born c. 1968), actress with Down syndrome
- Sir William Gull, 1st Baronet (1816–1890), physician
- Edward Castres Gwynne (1811–1888), Australian lawyer and politician

== H ==
- Denzil Dean Harber (1909–1966), ornithologist and Trotskyist
- Ed Harcourt (born 1977), singer/songwriter
- Julius Charles Hare (1795–1855), theologian and archdeacon of Lewes
- Edward Hargraves (1816–1891), Australian gold prospector
- Hugh Harris, musician: guitarist with The Kooks
- Jonathan Harvey (1939–2012), composer
- John Berry Haycraft (1859–1923), professor of physiology
- George Hutson (1889–1914), Olympic runner

== I ==
- James Iredell (1751–1799), American lawyer and associate justice of the Supreme Court of the United States

== J ==
- Alison Jolly (1937–2014), primatologist
- Arthur M. Jolly (born 1969), writer
- Sir Richard Jolly (born 1934), development economist

== K ==
- Peter Kellner (born 1946), journalist, political commentator, polling expert and president of YouGov
- Paul Austin Kelly (born 1960), opera singer
- Dame Grace Kimmins (1871–1954), social activist

== L ==
- Eleanor of Lancaster (1311–1372), wife of Richard Fitzalan, 10th Earl of Arundel
- Sean Lock (1963–2021), comedian and actor
- Peter Love (died 1610), pirate, said to have been born in Lewes

== M ==
- Gideon Mantell (1790–1852), obstetrician, geologist and palaeontologist
- Joan Maude (1908–1998), actress
- John Maynard Smith (1920–2004), evolutionary biologist and geneticist
- William McCrea (1904–1999), astronomer
- Reginald Medhurst (1920–2009), cricketer

== N ==
- Grace Nichols (born 1950), poet, lives in Lewes
- William Nicholson (born 1948), writer

== O ==
- Patrick O'Brian (1914–2000), author, novelist and translator, known for the Aubrey/Maturin series of sea stories, spent his childhood in Lewes

== P ==
- Thomas Paine (1737–1809), revolutionary, inventor and intellectual
- John Peckham (c. 1230–1292), archbishop of Canterbury
- Pleasance Pendred (1864–1948), suffragette and activist for women's rights
- Brenda Pye (1907–2005), landscape artist

== R ==
- Dick Rees (1894–1951), five-time champion jumps jockey
- Edward Ayearst Reeves (1862–1945), geographer; born in Lewes
- James Reeves (1909–1978), writer and poet
- Thomas 'Clio' Rickman (1760–1834), brewer and pamphleteer
- Richard Russell (1687–1759), physician (water cure)

== S ==
- Louis Francis Salzman (1878–1971), economic historian
- Sir George Shiffner (1762–1842), politician
- Professor Alasdair Smith (born 1949), economist and former vice-chancellor, University of Sussex
- Anthony Stapley (1590–1655), member of Parliament; one of the regicides of King Charles I
- Noel Streatfeild (1895–1986), children's author

== T ==
- Lesley Thomson (born 1958), crime writer
- Sir John Tomlinson (born 1946), opera singer
- Polly Toynbee (born 1946), journalist and writer
- Nicholas Tucker (living), academic and writer

== W ==
- Edward Perry Warren (1860–1928), art collector
- Margaret Weedon (1854–1930), archer, competed in the 1908 Summer Olympics in London
- John Jenner Weir (1822–1894), civil servant, entomologist and ornithologist
- Barbara Willard (1909–1994), children's novelist
- Mark Williams (born 1959), actor and comedian
- Kenneth Woodroffe (1892–1915), first-class cricketer and British Army officer, killed in action in World War I
- Virginia Woolf (1882–1941), novelist and essayist

== Y ==
- Nicholas Yonge (c. 1560–1619), singer and publisher
- Philip Yorke, 1st Earl of Hardwicke (1690–1764), politician

== See also ==
- List of people from Sussex
