= Robert Brian James =

British Army officer

- Born: 1912; Gainsborough, Lincolnshire
- Died: 3 August 1944 (aged 31) Normandy, France
- Buried: Hottot-les-Bagues Military Cemetery
- Allegiance: United Kingdom
- Branch: British Army
- Rank: Lieutenant Colonel
- Service number: 53746
- Commands: 5th Battalion, East Yorkshire Regiment
- Conflicts: Second World War: Mediterranean and Middle East theatre; Italian campaign; Allied invasion of Sicily; Western Allied invasion of France; Battle of Normandy †
- Awards: Distinguished Service Order & Two Bars

Robert Brian James DSO** (1912 – 3 August 1944) was a British Army officer of the Second World War. He was awarded the Distinguished Service Order (DSO) three times. He was the only son of Herbert Henry James and Laura Brind James of 58 Norfolk Road, Littlehampton. At the time of his death he was the commanding officer of the 5th Battalion, East Yorkshire Regiment, an infantry unit. He is buried in Hottot-les-Bagues Military Cemetery, Hottot-les-Bagues, Normandy.

First DSO was gazetted in 1941 for services in the Middle East. First Bar to the DSO was gazetted in June 1943 for service in the Middle East. Second Bar to the DSO was gazetted in October 1943 for services in Sicily as part of Operation Husky.

His service number was 53746.
