= Edward Boyse =

Edward Arthur Boyse
- Born: August 11, 1923; Worthing, Sussex
- Died: July 14, 2007 (aged 83)
- Education: University of London (MBBS, 1952) (MD, 1957)
- Awards: William B. Coley Award (1976); Isaac Adler Prize (1976); Cancer Research Institute Award in Tumour Immunology (1975); C. Chester Stock Award (1975)

Edward A. Boyse FRS, AAAS, NAS (August 11, 1923 – July 14, 2007) was a British-born, American physician and biologist best known for his research on the immune system and pheromones.

== Life ==
Boyse was born in Worthing, England, and studied medicine at the University of London.

Boyse joined the staff of Sloan-Kettering in New York City in 1962 following an appointment at New York University. He was a professor of biology at Cornell University Medical College between 1969 and 1989 and a professor at the University of Arizona between 1989 and 1994.

Boyse and others were among the earlier researchers to look at how the immune system responded to antigens using mice focussing on the role of white blood cells. In 1975, he won the Cancer Research Institute William B. Coley Award for distinguished research in immunology. in 1976 he won the Isaac Adler prize awarded jointly by Harvard and Rockefeller Universities. He later studied how animals can communicate through odors. Boyse was the first to propose that umbilical cord blood could be used in place of bone marrow for hematopoietic reconstitution. Boyse was a member of the National Academy of Sciences, a Fellow of the Royal Society, and a member of the American Academy of Arts and Sciences.

Boyse retired in Tucson, Arizona, where he died in 2007 from pneumonia, aged 83.
