= Garrow =

Garrow may refer to:

- Garrows are a group of people from India
- Garrow (Inheritance Cycle), is a minor character from the fantasy series The Inheritance Cycle
- Garrow, Perth and Kinross, a village in Perth and Kinross, Scotland

== Surname ==
- Alex Garrow (1923–1966), 20th-century Scottish politician
- Brian Garrow (born 1969), American tennis player
- David Garrow (born 1953), American historian
- Donald Garrow (1918–2001), British alpine skier
- Edward Garrow (1815–1896), English cricketer and clergyman
- Ian Garrow (1908–1976), British army officer
- James Mitchell Ellis Garrow (1865–1935), New Zealand lawyer and university professor
- James Thompson Garrow (1843–1916), Ontario lawyer
- John Garrow (1929–2016), British nutritionist
- Mark Garrow (1955–2007), American priest
- Nathan Garrow (born 2004), New Zealand footballer
- Nathaniel Garrow (1780–1841), 19th-century American politician
- Robert Garrow (1936–1978), American spree killer
- William Garrow (1760–1840), English lawyer of the late 18th and early 19th century
