= Governor Trumbull (1777 ship) =

Privateer Governor Trumbull Connecticut (1777) capture HMS Tobago

History

Massachusetts
- Name: Governor Trumbull
- Namesake: Governor of Connecticut Jonathan Trumbull
- Owner: Howland & Coit et al., of Connecticut
- Builder: Willet, Norwich, Connecticut
- Laid down: 1777
- Commissioned: 18 November 1778
- Captured: 5 March 1779

Great Britain
- Name: HMS Tobago
- Namesake: Tobago
- Acquired: 2 April 1779 by purchase of a prize
- Fate: Sold June 1783

Great Britain
- Name: Tobago
- Acquired: c.1783 (by purchase?)
- Fate: Lost August 1787

General characteristics
- Tons burthen: 247(bm)
- Sail plan: Sloop
- Complement: Connecticut:150; RN:125
- Armament: Connecticut:20 guns; RN: Originally:6 × 9-pounder + 10 × 6-pounder guns; 3 August 1789:16 × 6-pounder guns

Governor Trumbull was launched at Norwich, Connecticut in 1777 as a purpose-built privateer. There is no record of her having captured any British vessels but she did raid Tobago in 1779. The Royal Navy captured her shortly thereafter and took her into service as HMS Tobago. she served in the Leeward Islands until the Navy sold her in 1783, probably at Jamaica. She was apparently wrecked on 16 August 1787 at Tobago.

== Privateer ==
Governor Trumbull was commissioned on 18 November 1778 under Commander Henry Billings of Norwich, Connecticut, and fitted out at New London. She sailed from New London, Connecticut, at end-November. On 17 December the Connecticut privateer sloop American Revenue, Captain William Leeds, arrived at New London with sails, rigging, and stores from the British transport Marquis of Rockingham, which had wrecked on Gardiners Island on 13 December on a voyage from Newport, Rhode Island, to New York City. Of Rockingham's 22-man crew there were only five survivors. Governor Trumbull had assisted American Revenue in the salvage effort.

Governor Trumbull came into Stonington, Connecticut, at about the same time. She sailed from Stonington Point on 25 December, bound for the West Indies, and by mid-January 1779 was off Tobago. Billings decided to raid the lightly defended island.

On 16 January 50 men from Governor Trumbull landed at Man-o-War Bay. They established a small emplacement that they armed with two carriage and some swivel guns, and then the bulk of the force moved inland. An attack on a sugar mill cost the Americans three casualties. On the other hand, the men in the emplacement repelled an attack by Lieutenant Clark and 17 British planters and militia, killing one planter and wounding another.

Clark regrouped and a second attack forced the Americans to quit their emplacement and return to General Trumbull. The Americans had lost two men dead and some 26 prisoners. Billings then sailed north.

On 5 March Governor Trumbull encountered two British warships, HMS Venus and Ariadne towards the north end of St Bartholomew's. Venus set off in pursuit and after a chase of six hours, several shots from her chase guns and two broadsides, Governor Trumbull struck. The British took their prisoners of their prize and put a prize crew on board. Reportedly, Governor Trumbull had 103 men on board when the British captured her.

Her captors took Governor Trumbull into St John's, Antigua. She arrived there on 7 March and was condemned.

A British listing of prizes taken in the West Indies described Governor Trumbull as being of 20 guns and 150 men. It also put the place of capture as off St Christopher's.

== Royal Navy ==
The Royal Navy took Governor Trumbull into service as HMS Tobago, and commissioned her under Commander Butchart. Commander Charles Hotchkys replaced Butchart in June. Around November 1780 Lieutenant Benjamin Archer assumed command; he was promoted to commander in January 1781.

On 18 June 1781 Commander Benjamin Hulke became captain of Tobago. He commanded her until 23 August 1781.

On 9 March 1782 Commander George Martin became captain of Tobago.

Tobago was in company with Sibyl and HMS Alarm when they encountered the American frigate USS Alliance which was escorting USS Duc de Lauzun 140 miles (230 km) south of Cape Canaveral on 10 March 1783. An inconclusive engagement developed between Sibyl and Alliance that proved to be the last battle of the American Revolutionary War. Alarm and Tobago neither participated in the engagement nor captured Duc de Lauzun.

Commander Martin received a further promotion to post-captain soon after he left Tobago to take command of the 50-gun HMS Preston on 17 March 1783. Lieutenant Rowley Bulteel replaced Martin.

== Fate ==
The Royal Navy sold Tobago on 21 June 1783 for £2,050 in the West Indies, probably at Jamaica.

== Post script ==
Lloyd's List reported on 7 December 1787 that the "sloop Tobago" was totally lost on 16 August on the rocks on the windward side of Englishman's Bay, on the north side of Tobago.
