= 1803 Gatton by-election =

UK parliamentary by-election

- 24 January 1803
| Candidate | Philip Dundas | Joseph Clayton Jennings | William Bryant |
| Party | Tory |
| Popular vote | 7 | 0 | 0 |
| Percentage | 100.0% | 0.0% | 0.0% |
MP before election
James Dashwood
Tory
Subsequent MP
Philip Dundas
Tory

The 1803 Gatton by-election was a by-election to the House of Commons of the United Kingdom that took place on 24 January 1803.

The parliamentary borough of Gatton was a notorious "rotten" or pocket borough "in the pocket" of the Lord of the manor of Gatton, who at that time was Sir Mark Wood. It had, at most, seven voters – all tenants of Wood. At the 1802 general election, "Wood returned himself and his brother-in-law [James] Dashwood". Both were members of William Pitt the Younger's faction of the Tory Party. At Pitt's request, shortly after the election, Dashwood vacated his seat so as to make way for Philip Dundas.

== Background ==
=== 1802 result ===
General election 1802: Gatton
| Party | Candidate | Votes | % | ±% |
|---|---|---|---|---|
| Tory | Sir Mark Wood | Unopposed | | |
| Tory | James Dashwood | Unopposed | | |

== Result ==
Dundas was to be elected in a simple formality, returned uncontested. This was complicated, however, when Joseph Clayton Jennings, a barrister and reformer, "arrived on the scene", making it unexpectedly a contested election. Another candidate called William Bryant also proposed himself, although he stated he would not ask anyone for a vote and was standing to object to Wood holding onto the writ for 3 weeks before passing it to the county sheriff. He claimed the right to vote on the basis of 2 acres of freehold land in the constituency and cast a vote for Jennings. The returning officer was Patrick Hay, the constable and brother in law of Wood, who rejected the vote and Dundas was duly elected with seven votes, all of Wood's tenants voting for Dundas.

Dundas left for India two years later, causing another by-election, wherein Wood procured the seat for William Garrow – another reformist barrister, who won it uncontested and thereby made his entry in Parliament.

1803 Gatton by-election
| Party | Candidate | Votes | % | ±% |
|---|---|---|---|---|
| Tory | Philip Dundas | 7 | 100.0 | N/A |
| Unclear | Joseph Clayton Jennings | 0 | 0 | N/A |
| Unclear | William Bryant | 0 | 0 | N/A |
| Majority | | 7 | 100.0 | N/A |
| Turnout | | 7 (Note: The likely number of total possible electors was 7; however, this is unclear.) | 100 | N/A |
| Tory hold | | Swing | N/A | |
