= HMS Alarm (1758) =

Frigate of the Royal Navy

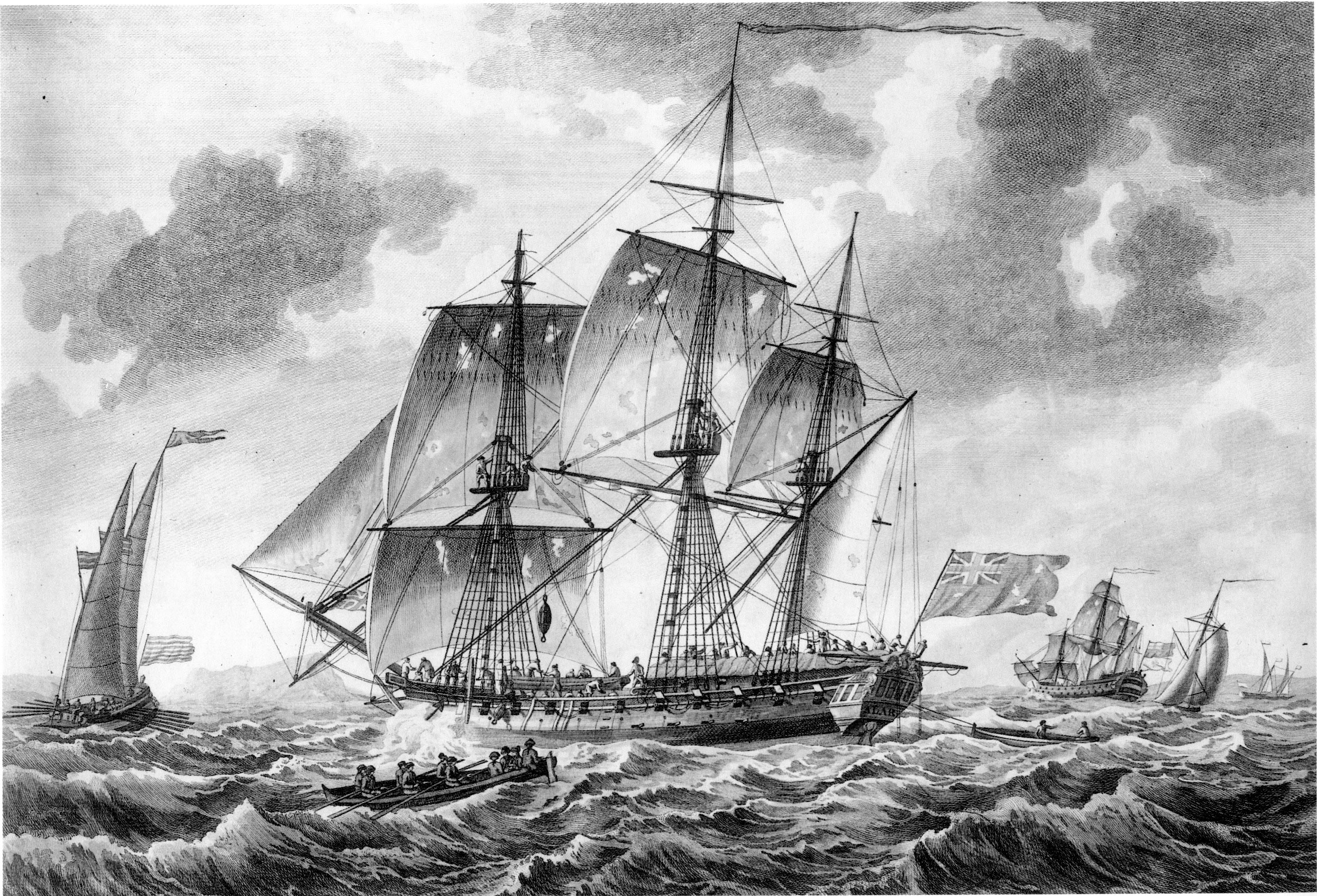
- Alarm conducting a Spanish prize into Gibraltar

History

Great Britain
- Name: HMS Alarm
- Builder: Barnard, Harwich
- Launched: 19 September 1758
- Fate: Broken up September 1812

General characteristics
- Class & type: Niger-class fifth-rate frigate
- Tons burthen: 683 bm
- Length: 125 ft (38 m)
- Beam: 35 ft 6 in (10.82 m)
- Sail plan: Full-rigged ship
- Armament: Upperdeck: 26 × 12-pounder guns; QD: 4 × 6-pounder guns; Fc: 2 × 6-pounder guns

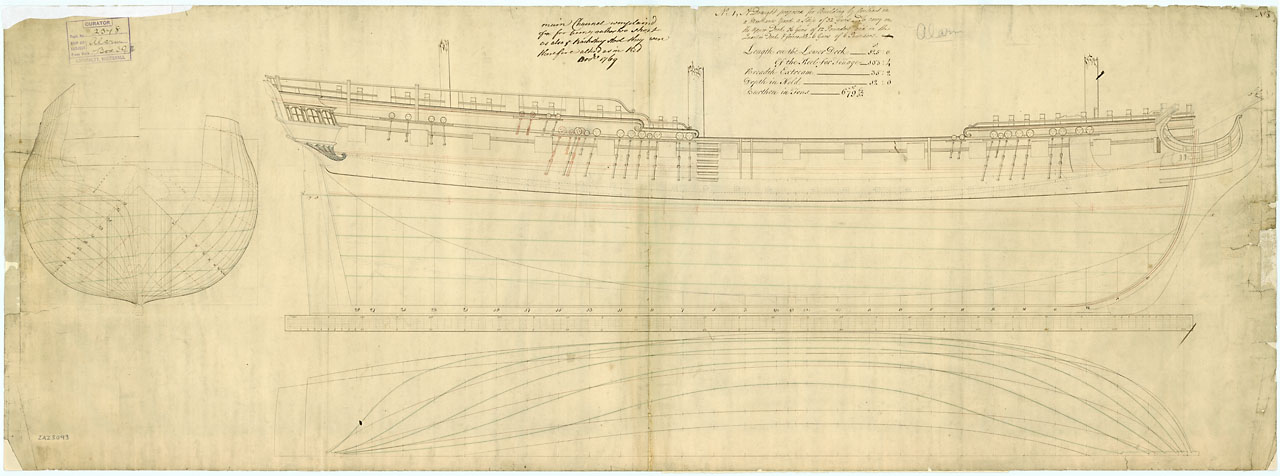
Lines Plan for Alarm

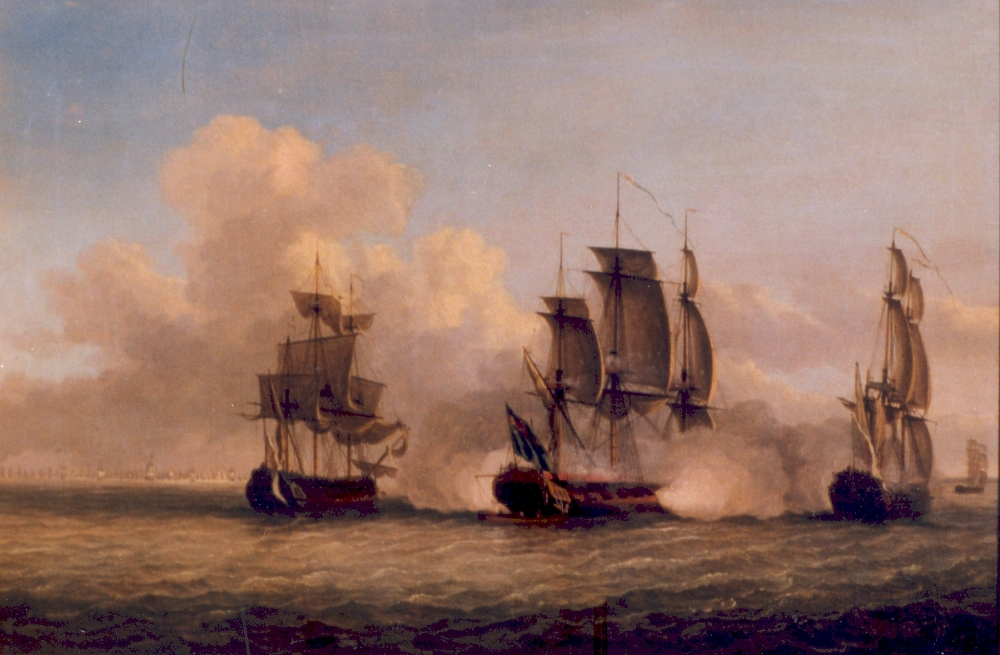
Capture of the Spanish ships Thetis and Phenix by the Royal Navy frigate HMS Alarm off Havana on 2 June 1762, by Dominic Serres.

HMS Alarm was a 32-gun fifth-rate Niger-class frigate of the Royal Navy, and was the first Royal Navy ship to bear this name. She was built at King's Yard in Harwich by John Barnard.

Copper-sheathed in 1761, she was the first ship in the Royal Navy to have a fully copper-sheathed hull.

== History ==
=== Experiments with copper sheathing ===
Alarm initially saw deployment in the West Indies, where she experimentally had her hull sheathed in a thin layer of copper. Firstly it was intended to reduce the considerable damage caused by the teredo woodworm, and secondly the well-established toxic property of copper was expected to lessen the speed-killing barnacle growth which always occurred on ships' hulls. Alarm's hull was first covered with soft stuff, which was hair, yarn and brown paper, and then covered with a layer of copper plates.

After a two-year deployment to the West Indies, Alarm was beached in order to examine the effects of the experiment. The copper had performed very well in protecting the hull from invasion by worm, and in preventing the growth of weed, for when in contact with water, the copper produced a poisonous film, composed mainly of oxychloride, that deterred these marine creatures. Furthermore, as this film was slightly soluble it gradually washed away, leaving no way in which marine life could attach itself to the ship. Satisfied that the copper had had the desired effect, the Admiralty introduced copper sheathing on a number of frigates.

In 1776 Alarm was resurveyed. It was soon discovered that the sheathing had become detached from the hull in many places because the iron nails which had been used to fasten the copper to the timbers had been "much rotted". Closer inspection revealed that some nails, which were less corroded, were insulated from the copper by brown paper which was trapped under the nail head. The copper had been delivered to the dockyard wrapped in the paper which was not removed before the sheets were nailed to the hull. The obvious conclusion therefore, and the one which had been highlighted in a separate report to the Admiralty as early as 1763, was that iron should not be allowed direct contact with copper in a sea water environment if severe corrosion of the iron was to be avoided. Later ships were designed with this in mind. The Admiralty had largely suspended the programme of fitting ships with copper sheathing after the 1763 report, and had not shown any further interest in developing effective copper sheathing until 1775. In the meantime the copper sheathing was removed from Alarm, and several other test vessels until an effective solution to the corrosion problem could be developed.

Later in her career she was commanded by a young John Jervis, from 1769 onwards. He sailed for the Mediterranean in May and arrived in Genoa on 7 September. Aboard Alarm at this time was Samuel Hood, son of Alexander Hood, and one of the many members of the Hood family to serve at sea. Samuel Hood served aboard Alarm from November 1765 to July 1772, in the post of purser.

=== Near loss ===
On the return voyage to England, on 6 April 1770, she was saved by Georges René Le Peley de Pléville from being wrecked off Marseille. Alarm had been battered by a storm in the evening and ran aground on the coast of Provence amongst boulders, and was in imminent danger of breaking up. Pléville quickly mustered the harbour pilots and rushed to the relief of the British. By the time he was able to board her, Alarm had already almost heeled over many times, and began to run aground. Pléville ordered a manœuvre that got her afloat again and brought her into harbour at Marseille. In gratitude for Pléville's actions, the Admiralty sent Jervis and Alarm back to Marseille in December to deliver a letter which read

Sir, the quality of the service which you have rendered to the frigate Alarm gives rise to the noble envy and admiration of the English. Your courage, your prudence, your intelligence, your talents have merited a crown on your efforts from Providence. Success has been your reward, but we pray you to accept as a homage rendered to your merit and as a pledge of our esteem and recognition, that which captain Jervis is charged with rendering back to you. In the name and order of my lords, Stephans

The present was a piece of silverware in the form of an urn, on which were engraved dolphins and other maritime attributes, with a model of the Alarm, and a richly engraved lid surmounted by a triton. Remarkable in its elegance of form and high level of finish and workmanship, this vase bore the English Coat of Arms, and had the following inscription, intended to preserve the memory of the event which had merited the present:

Georgio-Renato Pleville Le Pelley, nobili normano Grandivillensi, navis bellicœ portusque Massiliensis pro prœfecto, ob navim regiam in litiore gallico pericli – tantem virtute diligentiâque suâ servatam septem vin rei navalis Britannicœ. M.DCCLXX. ([Presented] to Georges-René Pléville Le Pelley, noble Norman of Granville, commander of a warship and of the port of Marseilles, because he saved from destruction a Royal Navy vessel which was about to be lost on the French coast – the seven lords of the British Admiralty [presented] this [for] the great courage and diligence he showed. 1770)

Thinking that he could not receive a gift from a foreign sovereign, de Pléville only accepted the urn after having been duly authorised to do so by the king of France. Jervis was also extremely grateful to de Pléville, and eager for the chance to reward him. He wrote to his sister from Alarm, anchored at Mahón on 27 December 1770:

I was twenty-four hours in the Bay of Marseilles, about a fortnight ago; just time enough to receive the warm embraces of the man to whose bravery and friendship I had, some months before, been indebted for my reputation, the preservation of the lives of the people under my command, and of the Alarm. You would have felt infinite pleasure at the scene of our interview.

Ten years later, de Pléville's devotion to the safety of the Alarm gained another reward, when his son – a young naval officer – was captured on board a frigate at the end of a battle in 1780 and taken to England. There, the British Admiralty sent him back to France without requiring a prisoner-exchange, after having authorised him to choose three other French naval officers to go with him.

The Admiralty were also greatly pleased by Jervis' actions in this matter, allowing his further promotion. From 1771 to May 1772, the ship became the "home" of the Duke of Gloucester, who was spending time in the Mediterranean because of ill health. Alarm then returned to England for paying off.

=== Off America ===
On 9 March 1783, Alarm was involved in one of the last naval battles of the American Revolutionary War, when Alarm, Sibyl, and the sloop of war Tobago intercepted two American vessels, the frigate USS Alliance and the transport Duc de Lauzun. The American ships were transporting bullion to the Continental forces and both sides were unaware that peace had been ratified over a month before. After a short battle between Sibyl and Alliance, the Americans escaped. Alarm did not herself actively participate in the engagement.

== French Revolutionary Wars ==
On 5 May 1795, off Puerto Rico, Alarm sank the corvette Liberté, of sixteen 4-pounder guns. (Note: Liberté had been commissioned as a privateer in February 1794 at Bordeaux. She was sold at Guadeloupe in June, and recommissioned there in July as a privateer. The French Navy requisitioned her in early 1795.)

On 23 November 1796 Alarm, under the command of Captain Fellowes, was cruising off Grenada when she encountered the Spanish corvette Galgo and captured her. Galgo, of 18 guns and 124 men, was under the command of Don Barber. She was sailing from Porto Rico to Trinidada and was carrying 80,335 dollars and provisions for the government at Trinidada. Alarm took Galgo into Grenada.

In 1796, Alarm had violated Trinidad's neutrality, so contributing to Spain's declaration of war on the side of Revolutionary France. In February 1797 Alarm was among the vessels of the British flotilla that captured Trinidad.

== Fate ==
Alarm shared with Amphion in the head-money that was finally paid in March 1829, for the capture of a Spanish gunboat, Nuestra Senora del Corvodorvya (alias Asturiana), on 25 November 1799.

Alarm continued in service for a number of years, finally being broken up in September 1812 at Portsmouth having spent 64 years in service.
