= HMS Sibyl (1779) =

Enterprise-class Royal Navy frigate

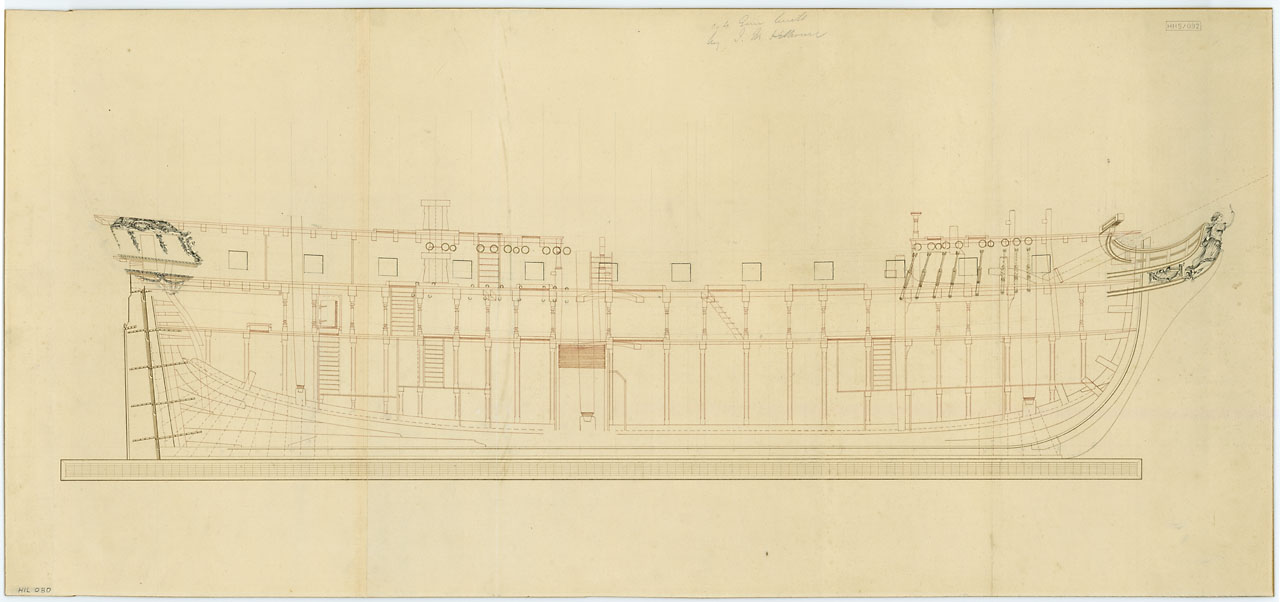
- Plan of HMS Medea, a sister ship of Sybil

History

Great Britain
- Name: HMS Sibyl
- Ordered: 24 July 1776
- Builder: Henry Adams, Bucklers Hard
- Laid down: 10 December 1776
- Launched: 2 January 1779
- Completed: 13 March 1779 (at Portsmouth Dockyard)
- Commissioned: October 1778
- Renamed: HMS Garland 1795
- Fate: Wrecked 26 July 1798

General characteristics
- Class & type: 28-gun Enterprise-class sixth-rate frigate
- Tons burthen: 599 20/94 (bm)
- Length: 120 ft 7 in (36.75 m) (overall); 99 ft 7 5/8 in (30.369 m) (keel)
- Beam: 33 ft 7 1/2 in (10.2 m)
- Depth of hold: 11 ft 0 in (3.35 m)
- Sail plan: Full-rigged ship
- Complement: 200 officers and men
- Armament: Upper deck: 24 × 9-pounder guns; QD: 4 × 6-pounder guns + 4 × 18-pounder carronades; Fc: 2 × 18-pounder carronades; 12 × swivel guns

HMS Sibyl was a 28-gun Enterprise-class sixth-rate frigate of the Royal Navy. Sibyl was renamed HMS Garland in 1795.

== Service history ==
Sibyl was first commissioned on 30 October 1778 under Captain Thomas Pasley, who was replaced as the ship's captain on 26 September 1780 by Lord Charles FitzGerald. In February 1781 Sybil was part of a three ship squadron that gave chase to a 30 ship Dutch convoy, laden with valuable supplies, under escort by Willem Krul that had departed from Sint Eustatius, a neutral port in the West Indies. The fleet intercepted the convoy and after a brief battle, Krull was mortally wounded where his flagship surrendered to Reynolds.

In 1783 Sibyl, under Captain James Vashon, was in company with HMS Alarm and Tobago when they encountered the American frigate Alliance, which was escorting USS Duc de Lauzun. An inconclusive engagement developed between Sibyl and Alliance that proved to be the last battle of the American Revolutionary War. Alarm and Tobago neither participated in the engagement nor captured Duc de Lauzun. Sibyl was renamed HMS Garland in 1795.

== Loss ==
In February 1798 Captain J. C. Searle sailed Garland for the Cape of Good Hope. There Captain James Athol Wood replaced him.

Wood received information that a large French ship was anchored off Port Dauphiné, Madagascar. He sailed Garland to investigate but as she approached the vessel on 26 July 1798, Garland struck a rock and sank before she could be run onshore. Still, the crew was able to take to the boats. Wood then decided to capture the French ship, which turned out to be a merchantman armed with 24 guns and carrying a crew of 150 men. The French crew had run their ship ashore at Garland's approach and abandoned her. However, when they saw Garland run ashore, they tried to retrieve their own vessel. Wood and his boats had the wind and reached the merchantman first. Wood was able to convince the natives to hand most of the Frenchmen over to the British. It was five months before the sloop-of-war Star arrived to rescue Wood, his crew, and his prisoners-of-war. Star took the prisoners to Île de France. Wood and his men returned to the Cape Colony in their prize, a small boat of 15 tons burthen that they had built, and some small vessels that were prizes to the Cape squadron.

Wood returned to England, where on 15 December 1798 he and his officers were acquitted at the court martial for the loss of their ship.
