= Philip Dundas =

Bombay Marine officer, politician and colonial administrator

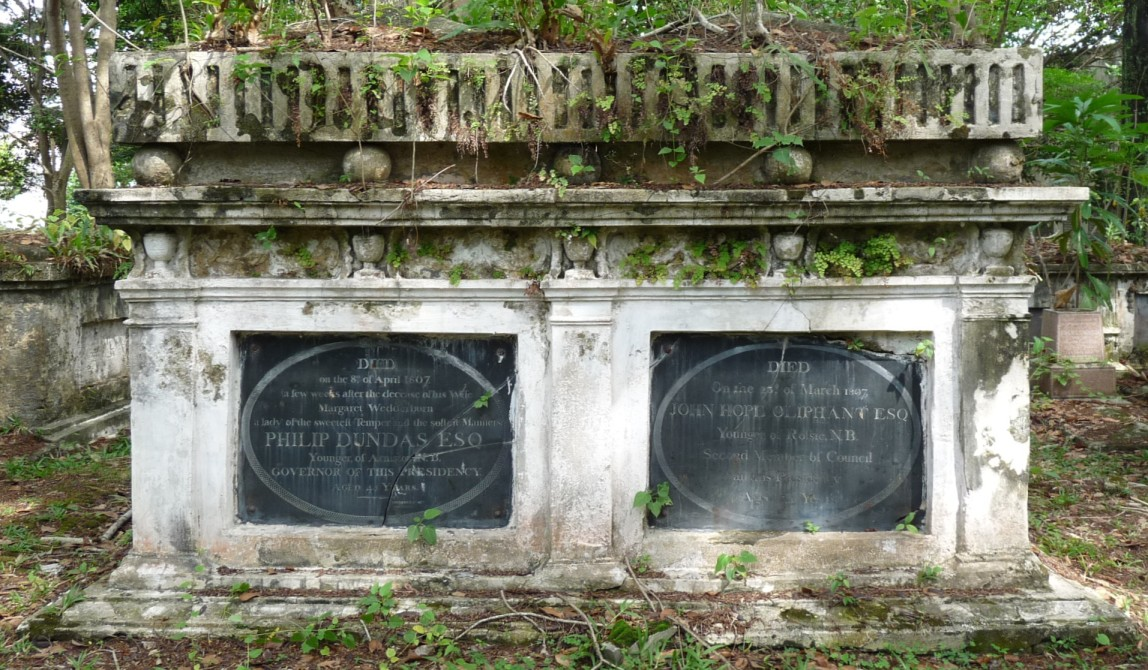
Dundas' grave (left) at the Protestant Cemetery, Penang. The grave next to him is of John Hope Oliphant, a councillor of Penang who was married to Dundas's sister-in-law.

Captain Philip Dundas (bapt. 7 May 1762 – 8 April 1807) was a Bombay Marine officer, politician and colonial administrator who served as president of the East India Marine Board and superintendent of Bombay. He returned to Britain and became a member of parliament and returned to the Far East to become governor of Prince of Wales Island.

== Early life ==
Philip Dundas was the fourth son of Robert Dundas of Arniston, the younger, and his second wife, Jean, daughter of William Grant, Lord Prestongrange.

== East India Company ==
Dundas joined the Bombay Marine and rose to become captain of Melville Castle from 1786 until 1792. Through the influence of his politically well connected uncle, Henry Dundas, 1st Viscount Melville, he was promoted from captain to president of the Marine Board and superintendent of Bombay from 1792 until 1801 (see Admiral-superintendent), during which time "he had £10,000 a year and accumulated £70,000 or £80,000, with which he returned to England".

== Member of Parliament ==
On returning to Britain Dundas stood as a member of Parliament for English constituency of Gatton and having won the seat after a contested by-election entered Parliament on 24 January 1803. He would remain in parliament for a little over two years, and although he remained a silent member, like other members of his family he voted in favour of measures that brought Addington administration to an end. In April 1805 he vacated his seat, leaving it at Pitt's disposal.

== Prince of Wales Island ==
Very shortly after leaving Parliament, Dundas embarked on a voyage to the East Indies to take up the governorship of Prince of Wales Island. His uncle the Viscount Melville had long hoped to establish a naval arsenal.

The newly appointed Lieutenant-Governor of Penang, arrived at the newly created Presidency of the British East India Company, between 18 and 24 September 1805, together with his Council and the subordinate officials, including his Deputy Secretary, Stamford Raffles, who would form his new government.

The status of Penang (comprising Prince of Wales' Island and Province Wellesley) at this time, was such that it was on an equal footing with the three great Presidencies in India — Calcutta, Madras, and Bombay. Dundas was Governor of Prince of Wales Isle (Penang) from 1805 to 1807.

He created a red-light district so that he could control disease without having to discourage business. On board HMS Belliqueux, in the Bay of Bengal, he died on 8 April 1807 just two years after he arrived, ill health from unsanitary conditions taking him, and was buried in Penang a few days later.

== Family ==
Dundas was married twice. In 1790 he married Penelope Ford Lindsay of Dublin. She died in 1802. They had no children.

On 5 May 1803 he married Margaret (died 1806), daughter of John Wedderburn of Ballendean (1729–1803) (and sister of Sir David Wedderburn, 1st Baronet (1775–1858)). They had two sons:

- Robert Adam, who assumed the surnames of Christopher and then Nisbet-Hamilton. He became a Conservative Member of Parliament.
- Philip Dundas (1806–1870), colonel in the army. On 30 October 1858 he married Lady Jane Charteris (died 1897), daughter of Francis, 7th Earl of Wemyss and March. They are buried together in the Old Kirkyard, Lasswade. They had no children.

== Other ==
At least three ships were named for Dundas. See: Philip Dundas

== Notes ==
Parliament of the United Kingdom
Preceded by James Dashwood; Sir Mark Wood, Bt	Member of Parliament for Gatton; 1803–1805; With: Sir Mark Wood, Bt	Succeeded by Sir Mark Wood, Bt; William Garrow
