= James Athol Wood =

Royal Navy officer (1756–1829)

Rear-Admiral Sir James Athol Wood CB
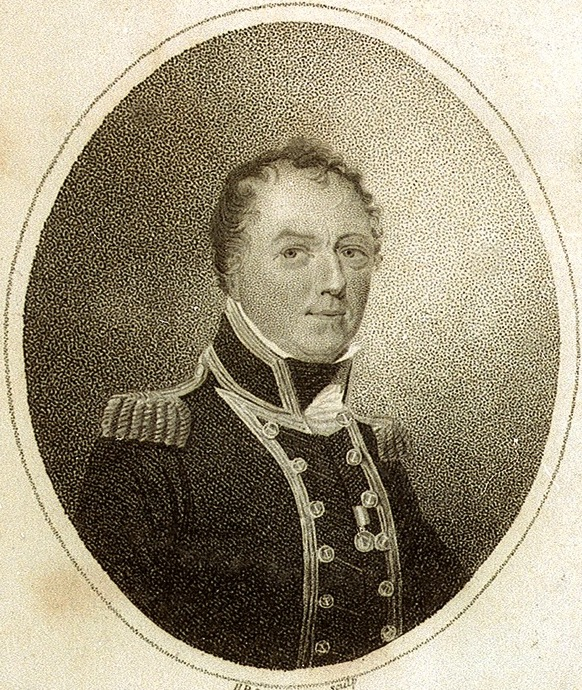
- Athol in 1810
- Born: 1756; Burncroft, Perthshire
- Died: July 1829 (aged 72–73); Hampstead, London
- Military career
- Allegiance: Great Britain; United Kingdom
- Branch: Royal Navy
- Rank: Rear-Admiral of the Blue
- Awards: Companion of the Order of the Bath

Rear-Admiral of the Blue Sir James Athol Wood CB (1756 – July 1829) was a Royal Navy officer. After serving on merchant ships for the East India Company from a young age, he entered the Royal Navy in 1774. Wood served in the navy for almost his whole life, and took part in several of the wars fought by Kingdom of Great Britain throughout the eighteenth and nineteenth century. During his career he was involved in several personal conflicts and feuds, which resulted in him being the subject of two courts-martial.

== Biography ==
=== Early life and the American Revolutionary War ===
Born in 1756, James Athol Wood was the third son of Alexander Wood (died 1778) of Burncroft, Perthshire. He was younger brother of Sir Mark Wood, 1st Baronet, and of Major-General Sir George Wood. First going to sea, for the East India Company, in 1772, he entered the navy in September 1774, as able seaman on board the sloop Hunter on the coast of Ireland and afterwards on the North America station. In July 1776, as master's mate, he joined HMS Barfleur, flagship of Sir James Douglas at Portsmouth. In April 1777 he was moved into HMS Princess Royal, the flagship of Sir Thomas Pye, and from her was lent to HMS Asia, as acting lieutenant, during the spring of 1778. He rejoined his ship in time to go out with Vice-Admiral John Byron to North America, where, on 18 October 1778, he was promoted to be lieutenant of the 50-gun ship HMS Renown, with Captain George Dawson. After taking part in the Siege of Charleston in April 1780, Renown returned to England; for some months Wood was employed in small vessels attached to the Channel Fleet, but in November 1781 he was appointed to the 64-gun ship HMS Anson with Captain William Blair, in which he was in the Battle of the Saintes on 12 April 1782, and continued till the peace. The next two or three years he passed in France, and then, accepted employment in merchant ships trading to the East Indies, and later on to the West Indies.

=== The West Indies and shipwreck off Madagascar ===
When the fleet under Sir John Jervis (afterwards Earl of St. Vincent) arrived at Barbados in January 1794, Wood happened to be there, and, offering his services to Jervis, was appointed to the flagship, HMS Boyne. After the reduction of Martinique he was sent to France with the cartels in charge of the French prisoners; but on their arrival at Saint-Malo in the end of May the ships were seized and Wood was thrown into prison. The order to send him to Paris, signed by Robespierre and other members of the committee of public safety, was dated 13 Prairial (1 June), the very day of Lord Howe's victory. In Paris he was kept in close confinement till April 1795, when he was released on parole and returned to England. He was shortly afterwards exchanged, was promoted (7 July 1795), and was appointed to command the sloop HMS Favourite, which he took out to the West Indies. There he was sent under (Sir) Robert Waller Otway to blockade St. Vincent and Grenada. While engaged on this service he had opportunities of learning that Trinidad was very insufficiently garrisoned; and after the reduction of the revolted islands he suggested to the commander-in-chief, Sir Hugh Cloberry Christian, the possibility of capturing it by an unexpected attack. Christian was on the point of going home and would not commit his successor (Sir) Henry Harvey, to whom, on his arrival, Wood repeated his suggestion. Harvey sent him to make a more exact examination of the state of the island, and, acting on his report, took possession of it without loss. Of four ships of the line which were there, only half manned and incapable of defence, the Spaniards burnt three; Wood was appointed, by acting order, to command the fourth, and sent home with convoy. His captain's commission was confirmed, to date 27 March 1797.

Early in 1798 he was appointed to the frigate HMS Garland, which had been sent to the Cape of Good Hope in February. He received information that a large French ship was sighted close in shore at Port Daupine, Madagascar. Wood sailed there, but when still a mile offshore Garland struck heavily on a sunken reef, and was irretrievably lost, 26 July. The French ship proved to be a merchantman, which Wood took possession of and utilised, together with a small vessel which he built of the timber of the wreck, to carry his men and stores to the Cape. Wood returned to England, where on 15 December 1798 he and his officers were acquitted at the court-martial for the loss of their ship.

=== Feud with Duckworth and court-martial ===
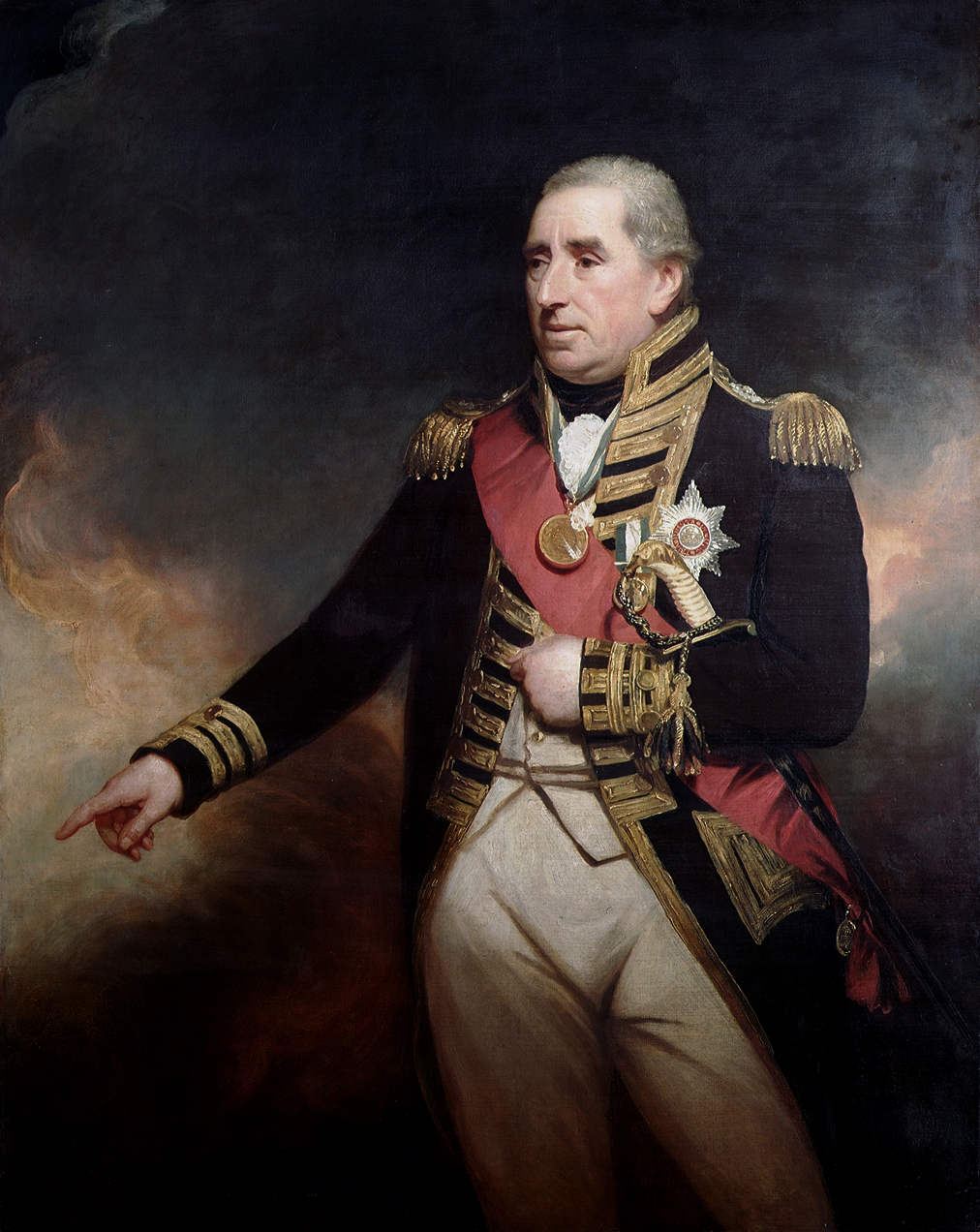
Sir John Thomas Duckworth

In April 1802 he was appointed to the 40-gun HMS Acasta, which, on the renewal of the war in 1803, was attached to the fleet off Brest and in the Bay of Biscay under Admiral (Sir) William Cornwallis. In November 1804 the Acasta was sent out to the West Indies in charge of convoy, and there Sir John Thomas Duckworth, wishing to return to England in her, superseded Wood and appointed his own captain. As no other ship was available for Wood, he went home as a passenger in Acasta, and immediately on arriving in England applied for a court-martial on Duckworth, charging him with tyranny and oppression and also with carrying home merchandise. The court-martial, however, decided that, in superseding Wood, Duckworth was acting within his rights, and, as Duckworth denied that the goods brought home were merchandise, the charge was pronounced "scandalous and malicious." When Wood's brother Mark moved in the House of Commons that the minutes of the court-martial should be laid on the table, the motion was negatived without a division.

=== Later years ===
Public opinion, however, ran strongly in favour of Wood, and he was at once appointed to Uranie, from which, a few months later, he was moved into HMS Latona, again attached to the fleet off Brest, and again sent with convoy to the West Indies, where in January 1807 he was second in command under (Sir) Charles Brisbane at the reduction of Curaçao — a service for which a gold medal was awarded to the several captains engaged. In December 1808 Wood was moved into the 74-gun ship HMS Captain, in which he took part in the Invasion of Martinique in February 1809. In July he was transferred to HMS Neptune, and sailed for England with a large convoy. On his arrival he was knighted, 1 November 1809, and in the following March he was appointed to HMS Pompee, one of the Channel fleet, off Brest and in the Bay of Biscay. On 10 March 1812 broad off Ushant he sighted a French squadron some twelve miles (19 km) distant. Of their nationality and force he was told by the frigate HMS Diana which had been watching them. It was then late in the afternoon, and when, about six o'clock, two other ships were sighted apparently trying to join the enemy's squadron, and that squadron wore towards him as though hoping to cut him off, Wood judged it prudent to tack and stand from them during the night. The night was extremely dark, and in the morning the French squadron was no longer to be seen; but the other two ships, still in sight, were recognised as English ships of the line.

The affair gave rise to much talk; Lord Keith was directed to inquire into it, and as his report was indecisive, the question was referred to a court-martial, which, after hearing much technical evidence—as to bearings, distances, and times—pronounced that Wood had been too hasty in tacking from the enemy, and that he ought to have taken steps at once to ascertain what the two strange ships were; but also, that his fault was due to "erroneous impressions at the time, and not from any want of zeal for the good of his majesty's service." That the sentence was merely an admonition which left no slur on Wood's character is evident from the fact that he remained in command of Pompée — sent to join Lord Exmouth's flag in the Mediterranean — till November 1815. On 4 June 1815 he was nominated a C.B.; on 19 July 1821 he was promoted to rear-admiral. He died at Hampstead, apparently unmarried, in July 1829.

Parliament of the United Kingdom
Preceded by Sir William Garrow; Sir Mark Wood	Member of Parliament for Gatton; 1806–1807; With: Sir Mark Wood	Succeeded by Sir Mark Wood; George Bellas-Greenough
