= USS Alliance (1778) =

Frigate of the Continental Navy

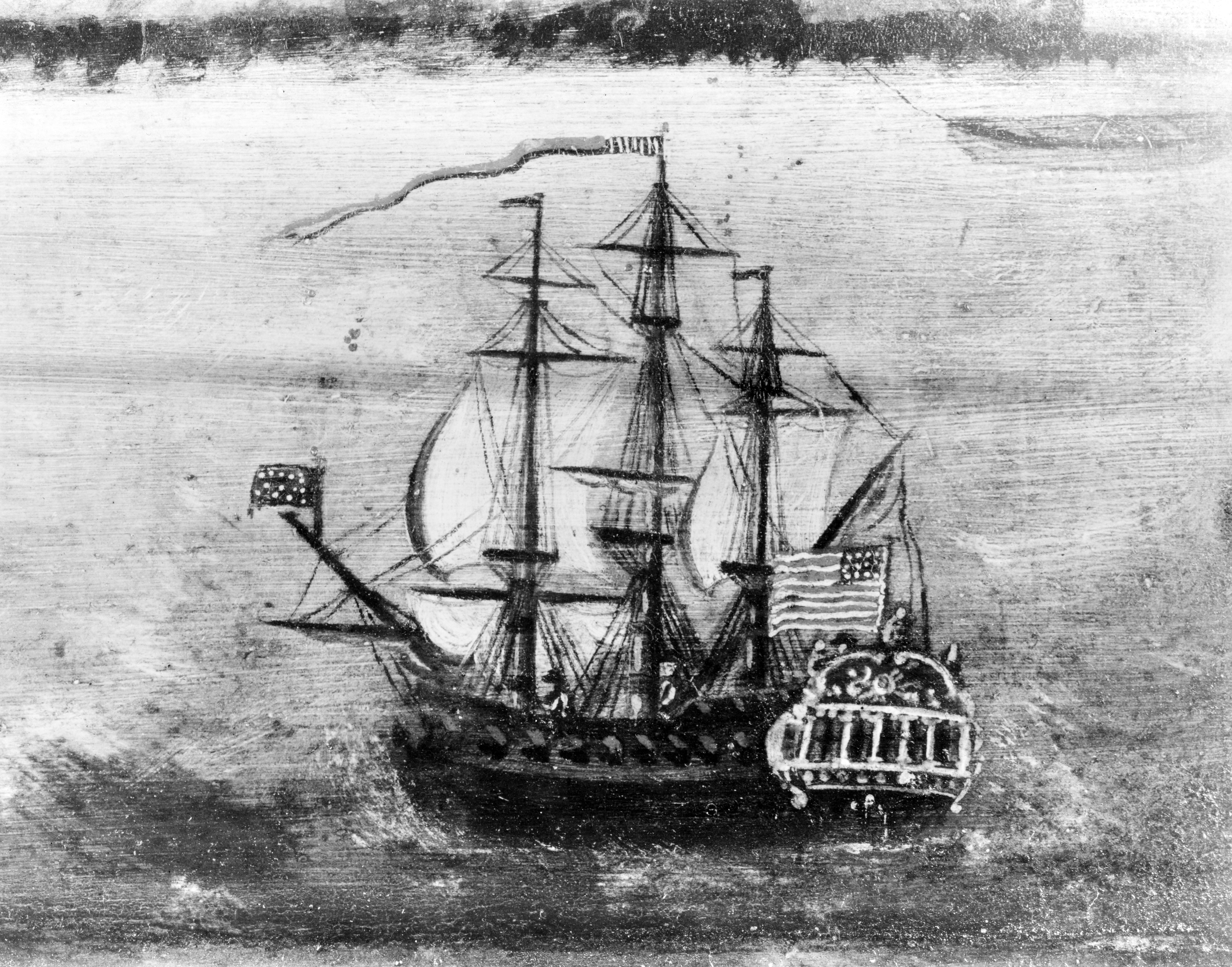
- Contemporary illustration of Alliance

History

United States
- Name: USS Alliance
- Builder: William and James K. Hackett
- Laid down: 1777
- Launched: 28 April 1778
- Fate: Sold into merchant service, 1 August 1785

General characteristics
- Type: Frigate
- Tonnage: 900
- Length: 151 ft (46 m)
- Beam: 36 ft (11 m)
- Depth: 12 ft 6 in (3.81 m)
- Propulsion: Sail
- Complement: 300 officers and men
- Armament: 28 × 18-pounder long guns; 12 × 9-pounder guns

Service record
- Commanders: Capt. Pierre Landais (1778–1780); Capt. John Barry (1780–1783)
- Operations: Battle of Flamborough Head

USS Alliance was a 36-gun frigate of the Continental Navy. Originally named Hancock, she was laid down in 1777 on the Merrimack River at Amesbury, Massachusetts, by the partners and cousins, William and James K. Hackett, launched on 28 April 1778, and renamed Alliance on 29 May 1778 by resolution of the Continental Congress. Her first commanding officer was Capt. Pierre Landais, a former officer of the French Navy who had come to the New World hoping to become a naval counterpart of Gilbert du Motier, Marquis de Lafayette. The frigate's first captain was widely accepted as such in America. Massachusetts made him an honorary citizen and the Continental Congress gave him command of Alliance, thought to be the finest warship built to that date on the western side of the Atlantic.

== 1779 ==
The new frigate's first assignment was to carry Gilbert du Motier, Marquis de Lafayette back to France to petition the French Court for increased support in the American struggle for independence. Manned by a crew composed largely of British and Irish sailors, Alliance departed Boston on 14 January 1779 bound for Brest, France. During the crossing, a plot to seize the ship, involving 38 members of the crew, was uncovered on 2 February before the mutiny could begin. The disloyal sailors were put in irons, and the remainder of the voyage, in which the frigate captured two prizes, was peaceful. The ship reached Brest safely on the 6th.

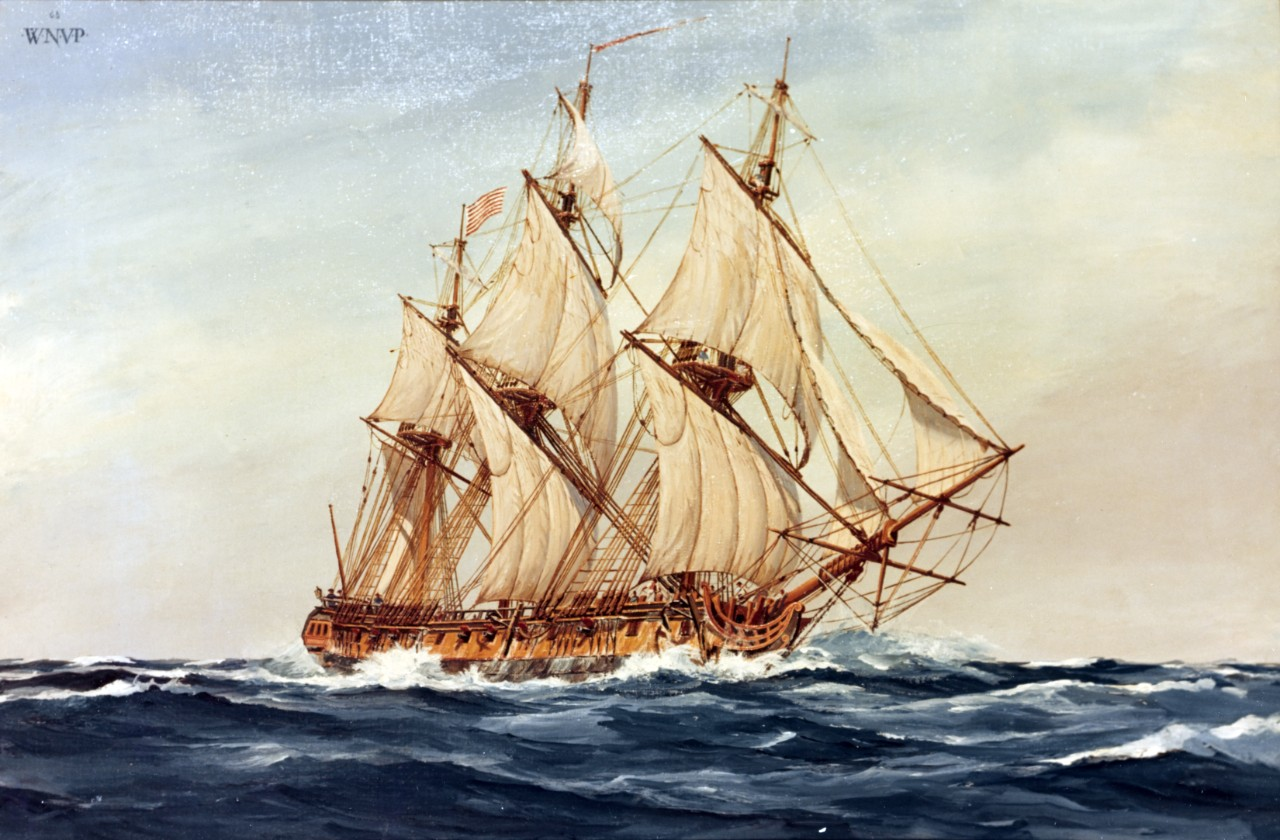
Alliance at sail

After the marquis and his suite had disembarked, Benjamin Franklin, one of the American commissioners in Paris, ordered her to remain in France despite the fact that Landais's original instructions had called for him to load the frigate with munitions and then to sail promptly for America. Instead, Franklin assigned the frigate to a squadron to be commanded by Captain John Paul Jones.

The squadron departed Groix Roads, near Lorient, France, on 19 June to escort a convoy of merchantmen to Bordeaux and other French ports. During a storm that night, Alliance collided with Jones' flagship, Bonhomme Richard, damaging the rigging of both vessels. Nevertheless, each was able to continue, and the squadron successfully completed its mission before returning to L'Orient where the two damaged warships were repaired.

The French planned an invasion of southern England that summer, and asked Jones to carry out a diversionary raid in the northern British Isles. His flotilla sortied from Groix Roads on 14 August and headed for the southwestern corner of Ireland to begin a clockwise circumnavigation of the British Isles.

Not many days passed before Landais – who in Jones' opinion had been the real culprit in the collision two months before – began to show his disinclination toward obeying orders. On the 23rd, he was enraged when the commodore refused to allow him to chase a ship into shallow and unknown waters "... when there was not sufficient wind to govern a ship." The next day, Jones later reported, Alliance's unruly captain came on board the flagship and addressed the commodore "... in the most gross and insulting terms." From that point on, Landais seemed to ignore orders entirely and operated Alliance according to his own whims.

Thus, the only really American warship in Jones' squadron belied her name by refusing to cooperate with the French vessels. She left her consorts during a squall on the night of 26 and 27 August and did not rejoin the squadron until 1 September. Betsy, a letter-of-marque ship she had just taken then accompanied the frigate. About this time, Bonhomme Richard captured a similar ship named Union off Cape Wrath at the northwestern corner of Scotland, and Jones allowed Landais to man both vessels. The latter again showed his complete contempt for the commodore by sending the captured ships (which would become known as the Bergen Prizes) to Bergen, Norway, where the Danish Government turned the ships over to the British consul, depriving their captors of the satisfaction of having hurt the enemy and of any hope of being rewarded for their efforts.

In the next few days, Alliance took two more small ships prompting Jones to signal Landais to board Bonhomme Richard for a conference. The American frigate's commander refused to obey, but instead again sailed off on his own.

For more than two weeks thereafter, Alliance worked her way south independently along the eastern shore of Great Britain while the remainder of the squadron followed a similar course from out of sight. A bit before midnight on 22 September, a lookout in Bonhomme Richard reported seeing two ships. Jones hoisted recognition signals which were unanswered. Landais was continuing to ignore the flagship's efforts to communicate. Nevertheless, at dawn, Jones was able to recognize Alliance and Pallas, a frigate of his squadron which had recently parted from the flagship with the commodore's permission to hunt prizes.

About mid-afternoon on 23 September, the squadron, off Bridlington, sighted ships rounding Flamborough Head to the north. The oncoming vessels were part of a convoy of over 40 British merchantmen which had sailed from the Baltic Sea under the escort of the 44-gun frigate HMS Serapis and the 22-gun hired armed ship Countess of Scarborough. The convoy had been warned about the American squadron and turned back northward towards Scarborough, the two escort vessels placing themselves between the merchant ships and the approaching threat.

As the gap closed, Jones signaled his ships to form a line of battle, but Landais ignored the order and sailed off to one side, forcing Countess of Scarborough to do likewise. In the ensuing four-hour Battle of Flamborough Head off England's Yorkshire coast, Landais, after briefly engaging the Countess took little part in the action. On the way to check up on the duel which developed between the Countess and the Pallas, Landais fired a broadside at Serapis, which was by then immobile, and lashed firmly alongside Bonhomme Richard- as a result both ships were damaged. Some time later, with Bonhomme Richard losing its duel, Alliance returned to the main battle, and Jones happily "... thought the battle was at an end ...." But, to his "... utter astonishment", Landais' ship "... discharged a broadside full into the stern of the Bonhomme Richard." Jones and his crew "... called to him [Landais] for God's sake to forbear firing into the Bonhomme Richard, yet he passed along off the side of the ship and continued firing." This, however, was just more collateral damage, resulting from Landais' policy of keeping well out of the line of the guns on the free side of Serapis. Unable to move his ship (either to escape or to aim a broadside at Alliance) Captain Pearson of Serapis surrendered within a short time.

Following the surrender, Alliance stood by during a desperate struggle to save the shattered, burning, leaking hulks. On the evening of the day after the battle, Jones realized that, while his flagship was doomed, her conquered opponent would probably survive. He, therefore, transferred his crew from Bonhomme Richard to Serapis and, the next morning, sadly watched the former sink. All this time, the squadron was simply drifting away from the British coast, but by 29 September, untiring labor had enabled Serapis to get underway, and, following French orders which were somewhat contrary to Jones's wishes, they headed for the coast of the Netherlands. Alliance sighted land on the evening of 2 October and, the following morning, she anchored in Texel Roads, Amsterdam's deep-water harbor, with the rest of the squadron.

When word of the battle reached London, the Admiralty ordered its nearby men-of-war to search for Jones' flotilla; the Royal Navy proceeded to look in all of the wrong places. By the time a merchantman informed London that Jones was at Texel Roads, the victorious allies and their prizes had been safe at anchor there for a week. The Royal Navy then set up a tight blockade off the Dutch port to check any seaward movement that the American squadron might attempt. Meanwhile, the British ambassador pressed the government of the Dutch Republic to return both Serapis and Countess of Scarborough to England. Failing that he demanded that Jones' squadron be expelled from Texel and thus forced to engage with the Royal Navy's blockading squadron.

Indeed, on 12 November, the Netherlands Navy had moved a squadron of ships of the line to Texel, and its commanding officer had ordered Jones to sail with the first favorable wind. Nevertheless, the adroit commodore managed to stall his departure for over six weeks. By that time, he had managed to restore Alliance to top trim and to ready her for sea. Since the other ships in his squadron had by this time, for complex diplomatic and legalistic reasons, shifted to flying French colors Jones decided to leave them behind when he left Holland in Alliance. He had long since relieved Landais in command of that frigate, pending an official inquiry into his conduct during the cruise.

On the morning of 27 December, after foul weather had forced the British blockaders off their stations, an easterly wind sprang up and enabled Alliance to stand out to sea. She dropped the pilot an hour before noon and headed southwest along the Netherlands coast. Less than a day later the frigate transited Dover Strait and entered the English Channel. On the night of 31 December, she was off Ushant, an island off the westernmost tip of Brittany, when 1779 gave way to 1780.

== 1780 ==
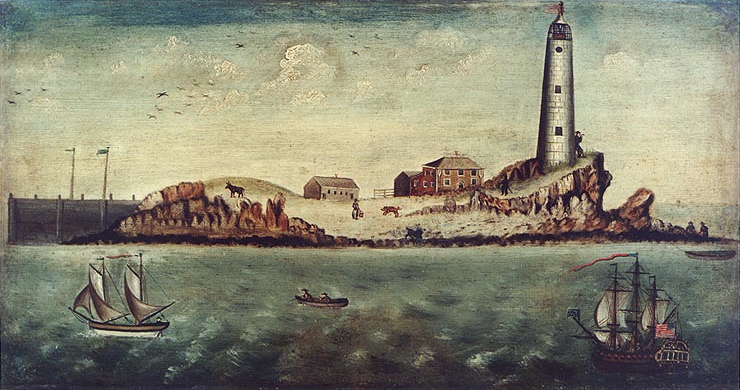
Alliance passing Boston lighthouse on its return from France in 1780, painting by Matthew Parke

For just over a fortnight thereafter, she cruised to the south looking for British shipping; but, with the exception of one small English brig which she took, the ship encountered only friendly or neutral vessels. On 16 January 1780, Jones decided to visit Corunna, Spain, for provisions and maintenance which entailed shortening the frigate's main yard and scraping her bottom.

On the 27th, she got underway in company with the French frigate Le Sensible. Want of winter clothing then prevented Jones from beginning an extended cruise in quest of prizes; and, instead, the ship struggled across the Bay of Biscay against head winds along a roughly northeasterly course toward L'Orient. En route, she recaptured a wine-laden French barque – a prize which had been taken by an English privateer – and saved the foundering vessel's cargo before the barque sank. She also chanced upon Livingston and escorted that tobacco-laden American merchantman to the French coast.

Alliance anchored in Groix Roads on 10 February and moved into L'Orient harbor on the 19th. That day, Benjamin Franklin suggested that Jones take on a cargo of arms and uniform cloth for the American Army and promptly get underway for home.

Jones agreed with Franklin's suggestion, but was kept in France for many months thereafter, attending to military, diplomatic, and social matters which he felt to be important to his country, to his crew, and to himself. Most of this time, he was away from his ship in Paris.

Meanwhile, the deposed Landais had arrived at L'Orient seeking passage to America where he hoped to be vindicated in a trial by court-martial. There, he met Arthur Lee, a disaffected fellow commissioner of Franklin, who also wanted to return home. Lee – who also hated Jones – persuaded Alliance's former captain that neither Jones nor Franklin had had the authority to relieve him of command since Landais had held a Continental commission. Convinced that he had been wronged, Landais went on board the frigate and assumed command on 12 or 13 June.

Jones arrived at L'Orient, where he heard of this coup. He journeyed to Paris and obtained support from Franklin and Antoine de Sartine, the French Minister of Marine. When Jones returned to L'Orient on 20 June, he found that Alliance had already weighed anchor and moved to Port-Louis, Morbihan, where a recently emplaced boom blocked her path. The batteries that guarded the port, as well as three French warships, had received orders to fire on the frigate if she attempted to stand out to sea.

Surprisingly, Jones then interceded with the French authorities asking them to allow the ship to pass. He justified this action as springing from a desire to avoid wasting lives, losing the fine frigate, and straining Franco-American friendship by having French forces attack an American warship.

The hero of Flamborough may have been rationalizing to conceal less lofty motives. Samuel Eliot Morison strongly endorsed this hypothesis: "The conclusion is inescapable, that Jones was not particularly eager to regain command of Alliance. He had to pretend that he was, of course, but actually he felt well rid of her, and of Landais too".

Alliance was allowed to leave France unmolested. Her homeward voyage proved to be anything but routine. Landais quarreled with his officers, abused his men, and made life miserable for his passengers. The ship had hardly lost sight of land when he locked up Capt. Matthew Parke because the commanding officer of the embarked Marine Corps contingent refused to swear unconditional obedience under all possible circumstances. Any seamen who had joined the frigate after Bonhomme Richard had sunk were suspected of disloyalty, many were shackled and imprisoned in the ship's rat-infested hold. Even Arthur Lee, who had urged the Frenchman to take command, came close to being stabbed with a carving knife for taking the first slice of roast pig at dinner. In operating and navigating the ship Landais gave orders which violated the rules of safe and sensible seamanship.

The fearful and exasperated officers and passengers finally agreed that the commanding officer must be insane, and they forcibly relieved him of command on 11 August. Alliance continued on to America in a happier and more orderly fashion under the command of Lt. James A. Degge. She arrived at Boston on 19 August 1780.

The Navy Board at that port promptly gathered information on the events of the voyage and sent a hasty report to Philadelphia where the Board of Admiralty immediately ordered a thorough investigation of the whole affair. At the same time it appointed Capt. John Barry to take command of the ship and make her ready for sea with great dispatch.

Barry arrived at Boston on 19 September with orders stripping Landais of all claim to command of the frigate. By that point the recalcitrant Landais had shut himself up in the captain's cabin and refused to leave, and he was now forcibly carried off the ship by a party of marines led by his first adversary of the voyage, Capt. Parke. Trials of Landais and Degge resulted in the ousting of both men from the service.

== 1781 ==
Meanwhile, efforts to restore Alliance to fighting trim progressed slowly – when they moved at all – because of a dearth of both men and money. Funds for the necessary yard work and for provisioning and manning the ship were slow in reaching Boston until Col. John Laurens – a former aide-de-camp to General George Washington, a successful battlefield commander, and an exchanged prisoner of war – appeared there on 25 January 1781. Congress had appointed Laurens as its envoy extraordinary to France because his military experience seemed to fit him to become a convincing spokesman for Washington's needy army. It had also selected Alliance as the speediest and safest ship to carry the dashing young officer to Europe. The urgency of Alliance's new mission made the funds and crew available so that the ship was ready to sail by the end of the first week of February. A favorable wind came up on the 11th enabling her to depart Nantasket Roads and stand out to sea.

Five days later, she entered crowded ice fields and suffered "considerable damage" as she forced her way through. Her crew contained many British sailors, a group of whom plotted to take over the frigate and to kill all her officers but one who would be spared to navigate the vessel to an English port. However, Barry took careful precautions to prevent the mutiny from erupting.

While she sailed eastward Barry followed the orders of the Naval Committee to not pursue any shipping which would delay his progress. Yet, on 4 March, the frigate encountered a ship and a British cruiser. . One shot brought both vessels to. The cruiser proved to be the English privateer Alert and her consort was Buono Campagnia, a prize which the Britisher had recently taken. Barry took Alert as a prize, but released the merchantman. Five days later, on 9 March, the frigate anchored in Groix Roads and disembarked her important passenger and his three companions: Thomas Paine, whose writings had exerted great influence in persuading the colonies to seek independence, Major William Jackson, a Continental Army officer from South Carolina, and the vicomte de Noailles, a cousin of Lafayette.

After almost three weeks in port, Alliance headed home on the afternoon of 29 March, escorting Marquis De Lafayette, an old, French East Indiaman which an American agent had chartered to carry a valuable cargo of arms and uniforms for the Continental Army. Before the month was out, Barry discovered and investigated a mutiny plot and punished the conspirators.

At dawn on 2 April a lookout sighted two ships to the northwest, Barry headed toward the strangers and ordered the Indiaman to follow. Undaunted, the distant vessels – which proved to be two British brigs – continued to approach the little American convoy and fired a broadside at the frigate as they passed abreast. Two answering salvoes from Alliance robbed the larger of the two English vessels of her rigging and forced her to strike her colors. Barry ordered Marquis De Lafayette to attend to the captured foe while he pursued and took the second brig. The first prize, a new and fast privateer from Guernsey named Mars though badly damaged, was repaired and sent to Philadelphia under an American crew. Marquis De Lafayette provided the prize crew for the smaller vessel, a Jersey privateer named Minerva. Barry ordered the prizemaster of this vessel to head for Philadelphia but Marquis De Lafayette's captain had secretly ordered him to head for France if he had a chance to slip away. On the night of 17 April, foul weather separated Mars from the convoy. Nevertheless, that prize dutifully continued on toward the Delaware capes. Minerva slipped away during the next night and apparently set course for the Bay of Biscay. Marquis De Lafayette dropped out of sight during a fierce storm on the night of the 25th.

After spending two days looking for her lost charge, Alliance continued on toward America alone. On 2 May, she took two sugar-laden Jamaicamen. Off Newfoundland Banks later that day, Alliance sighted but escaped the attention of a large convoy from Jamaica and its Royal Navy escorts. Ironically, a few days before, the missing Marquis De Lafayette and her treacherous master had fallen prey to this same British force.

Almost continuous bad weather plagued Barry's little force in the days that followed until Alliance permanently lost sight of her two prizes on 12 May. During a tempest on the 17th, lightning shattered the frigate's main topmast and carried away her main yard while damaging her foremast and injuring almost a score of men.

Jury-rigged repairs had been completed when Barry observed two vessels approaching him from windward 10 days later but his ship was still far from her best fighting trim. The two strangers kept pace with Alliance roughly a league off her starboard beam. At first dawn, the unknown ships hoisted British colors and prepared for battle. Although all three ships were almost completely becalmed, the American drifted within hailing distance of the largest British vessel about an hour before noon; Barry learned that it was the sloop of war HMS Atalanta. Her smaller consort proved to be Trepassey, also a sloop of war. The American captain then identified his own vessel and invited Atalanta's commanding officer to surrender. A few moments later, Barry opened the inevitable battle with a broadside. The sloops immediately pulled out of field of fire of the frigate's broadsides and took positions aft of their foe where their guns could pound her with near impunity in the motionless air, Alliance – too large to be propelled by sweeps – was powerless to maneuver.

A grapeshot hit Barry's left shoulder, seriously wounding him, but he continued to direct the fighting until loss of blood almost robbed him of consciousness. Lieutenant Hoystead Hacker, the frigate's executive officer, took command as Barry was carried to the cockpit for treatment. Hacker fought the ship with valor and determination until her inability to maneuver out of her relatively defenseless position prompted him to seek Barry's permission to surrender. Indignantly, Barry refused to allow this and asked to be brought back on deck to resume command.

Inspired by Barry's zeal, Hacker returned to the fray. Then a wind sprang up and restored Alliance's steerage way, enabling her to bring her battery back into action. Two devastating broadsides knocked Trepassey out of the fight. Another broadside forced Atalanta to strike, ending the bloody affair. The next day, while carpenters labored to repair all three ships, Barry transferred all of his prisoners to Trepassey which – as a cartel ship – would carry them to St. John's, Newfoundland, to be exchanged for American prisoners. HMS Charlestown recaptured Atalanta in June and sent her into Halifax.

Temporary repairs to Atalanta ended on the last day of May, and the prize got underway for Boston. After more patching her battered hull and rigging, Alliance set out the next day and reached Boston on 6 June. While Barry recuperated, her repairs were again delayed by want of funds. Lord Cornwallis surrendered his army at Yorktown, ending the war's last major action on land, but not the war, well before she was ready for sea. As had happened before, her restoration to service was hastened by decision to use the frigate to carry an important person to France. Lafayette – who had completed his work in America with a major role in the Yorktown campaign – arrived in Boston on 10 December 1781, wanting to return home. Even with the aid of the Marquis' great influence, a full fortnight passed before she could put to sea on Christmas Eve 1781.

== 1782 ==
The ship arrived off L'Orient on 17 January 1782 and disembarked Lafayette and his party.

Barry wanted to make a cruise in European waters to capture British shipping which would yield crewmen to be used in freeing American prisoners by exchange. Alliance got underway in February and headed for the Bay of Biscay. Accompanying her out was the American letter-of-marque brig Antonio which was bound for home. Three days later, she chased and overhauled an American brigantine which jettisoned her guns in an effort to escape. Antonio's commander offered to escort the unfortunate, and now defenseless, merchantman to Philadelphia and they parted from Barry the next day. Alliance encountered only friendly and neutral shipping before putting in at L'Orient on February.

Barry remained in port more than two weeks awaiting dispatches from Paris containing Franklin's observations on the diplomatic scene and on prospects for England's recognition of American independence and negotiations for peace. The messages arrived on 15 March, and the following day Alliance headed home.

Wretched weather and contrary winds plagued the ship for much of the voyage. The almost incessant northerly blasts forced her south into hot, unhealthful climes. Eight men died before the end of April when she managed to turn north with the trade winds and head for the Delaware River.

The frigate reached Cape Henlopen on 10 May, but found it guarded by a Royal Navy ship of the line which – in company with a tender – gave chase. Fleeing south and eluding her pursuers, Alliance turned north around Montauk Point and across Long Island Sound to New London, Connecticut, where she arrived on 13 May.

Although hopeful of soon beginning another cruise, Barry again was frustrated by the inevitable shortages of men, money, and material. Almost three months passed before Alliance was finally ready for sea. She reentered Long Island Sound on 4 August and almost immediately took Adventure, a Rhode Island brigantine which had fallen prey to an English privateer. Barry sent the prize back to New London and unsuccessfully sought her captor. On the 10th, while sailing toward Bermuda, the frigate captured the schooner Polly and sent her to Boston. On the 25th, she retook Fortune, a Connecticut sloop which the British privateer Hawk had seized on the 16th.

At the end of August, Barry headed north in quest of stragglers from a convoy which had sailed from Jamaica a bit over a month before. A week later he made a prize of Somerset, a Nantucket whaler that had been sailing under a British pass.

On 18 September Alliance captured a damaged British brig and learned that a storm had scattered the Jamaica convoy sinking or crippling both escorts and merchantmen. Making temporary repairs to this prize, Barry sent her to Boston and then began looking for the Jamaicamen. On the 24th he captured Britannia and Anna, carrying coffee, logwood, sugar, and rum. On the 27th the snow Commerce became his prize. The next day he captured the dismasted Kingston.

Though he would have preferred to take his prizes home Barry was now closer to Europe. Prevailing westerly winds clinched the matter, prompting him to head for France. The eastward passage was slow and stormy, but the convoy reached Groix Roads on 17 October.

Alliance got underway again on 9 December 1782 for the West Indies.

== 1783 ==
At the end of a largely uneventful passage, she anchored off Saint-Pierre, Martinique, on 8 January 1783. There Barry found orders to sail to Havana to pick up a large quantity of gold and to deliver it to Congress at Philadelphia. After brief repairs, Alliance resumed her voyage on the 13th, touched at St. Eustatius and Cape Francois, and reached Havana on the last day of January.

Another American warship, USS Duc de Lauzun, was already in port on the same mission. The specie had already been loaded on Duc de Lauzun and Barry decided to escort her home. The inevitable delays kept both ships in port until 6 March. The next day, they encountered two Royal Navy frigates that gave chase. Barry chose not to fight these warships rather than risk losing the funds his consort carried, and the American vessels eluded their pursuers. Three days later they encountered the same pair – HMS Alarm and HMS Sibyl – in company with the sloop-of-war HMS Tobago.

Still striving to avoid risk to the desperately needed money he was carrying to Congress, Barry again headed southwest to escape from these unidentified strangers and ordered her consort to follow. Far off in that direction, the rigging of another ship appeared over the horizon, sailing away from the others.

Soon Alliance was noticeably pulling away from the pursuers but Duc de Lauzun – second in line – was losing ground to Alarm. In the distance, the newcomer was seen to change course and head toward Alliance. Alarm evidently gave up the chase and headed away. Sybil pressed on and soon began firing at Duc de Lauzun.

Confident in both Alliance's speed and her fighting ability, Barry maneuvered her between Sybil and Duc De Lauzun to demand the full attention of the former so that the latter might slip away to safety. Sybil then turned her fire toward Alliance and managed to send one shot from her bow chaser into the American frigate's cabin, mortally wounding a junior officer and scattering many splinters. Yet Barry held Alliance's fire until she was within a "pistol's shot" of her opponent. At that point, a broadside from the American warship opened some 40 minutes of close-in fighting which finally forced Sybil to flee in the wake of Alarm and Tobago. Ships' logs indicate that this battle was fought 140 miles (230 km) south of Cape Canaveral on 10 March 1783. Captain Vashon, commander HMS Sybil, is recorded as saying "he had never seen a ship so ably fought as the Alliance." Captain Vashon is further quoted as saying of Barry, "every quality of a great commander was brought out with extraordinary brilliancy".

Meanwhile, the Treaty of Paris which ended the war and recognized the independence of the United States had been ratified on 3 February 1783, some five weeks before the battle.

The two American ships again headed home on the day following their brush with the British, 11 March, but separated off Cape Hatteras a week later. On the 19th, Alliance met a British ship of the line as she headed in toward the Delaware capes. She gave chase and forced Alliance back out to sea. This created a diversion which allowed Duc De Lauzun to slip into the Delaware unmolested and ascend the river to Philadelphia.

Alliance continued on northward and arrived at Newport, Rhode Island, at midafternoon on 20 March 1783. Since that port could easily be raided by British men-of-war, she soon proceeded up Narragansett Bay and anchored just below Providence. There, her crew was reduced to peacetime needs, and she was thoroughly overhauled.

Ordered to proceed to Chesapeake Bay to take on a cargo of tobacco for shipment to Europe, the frigate got underway on 20 June, but, headed for sea, she struck a rock and was stranded until high tide. Upon floating free, Alliance still seemed to be tight and resumed her voyage via the Virginia Capes and the lower Chesapeake Bay to the Rappahannock River. She then moved up that river where she began taking on tobacco. When completely loaded, she headed downstream on 21 August and sailed into the Atlantic three days later.

Soon after the ship entered the open sea, water rose rapidly in her hold. A hasty investigation revealed that a leak had developed where she had struck the rock weeks before. The crew's attempts to stem the influx failed, forcing Barry to head for the Delaware.

Further examination of the ship at Philadelphia ruled out any quick remedy and caused Congress to cancel the voyage. Her tobacco was transferred to other ships and her crew was further reduced to the bare minimum necessary to keep her in reasonably satisfactory condition. When the survey board reported that the necessary repairs would be quite expensive, no funds were available for the task.

== 1785–1788 ==
It seems that the work was never done before Alliance – the last ship left in the Continental Navy – was sold in Philadelphia on 1 August 1785 to John Coburn and a partner named Whitehead. These gentlemen subsequently sold her to Robert Morris who converted the vessel to an East Indiaman. Her new owner – who, as the guiding spirit on naval matters in the Continental Congress and that body's Agent of Marine in the later years of the American struggle for independence, had directed her operations – selected Thomas Read as her master during her first merchant service. That former captain in the Continental Navy took her to China by a new route through the Dutch East Indies and the Solomon Islands. She departed Philadelphia in June 1787 and arrived at Canton on 22 December of that year. While passing through the Carolines on the outward voyage Read found two islands which were not on his chart and named the first – probably Ponape – Morris, and the second, Alliance. At Canton he loaded the ship with tea which he delivered back at Philadelphia on 17 September 1788, ending a record voyage.

"On her voyage to China, she had for her commander, Thomas Reed; first- mate, the late Commodore Dale; and for supercargo, the late George Harrison, of Chestnut street.

It is recorded thus: "September 19, 1788, the ship ' Alliance,' Thomas Reed commander, and George Harrison supercargo, arrived from Canton, consigned to Isaac Hazlehurst & Co.," of which Robert Morris was the company.

The ship was seven hundred and twenty-four tons register: a very large ship in those days."

== After 1788 ==
An 1860 source states, "Mr. [Robert] Morris bought the United States frigate "Alliance," and fitted her up and out for the East Indies, in which she made but one voyage to China, and was condemned on her return as unseaworthy, dismantled, and drifted to Petty's Island— where 'tis said some of her ribs yet perpetuate the fact of her existence." At low tide, some of her timbers could be seen in the sands there until her remaining hulk was destroyed during dredging operations in 1901.

== Bibliography ==
- Ignatius, Martin; Griffin, Joseph (1897). The history of Commodore John Barry.
  Published by the Author, Philadelphia. p. 261. Url
- —— (1903). Commodore John Barry: "the father of the American navy".
  Published by the Author, Philadelphia. p. 424. Url
- Meany, William Barry (1911). Commodore John Barry, the father of the American navy:
  a survey of extraordinary episodes in his naval career.
  Harper & brothers, New York, London. p. 74. Url
