= John Hostettler (author) =

- Born: May 1925 West London, England
- Died: 23 October 2018 (aged 93) Rustington, West Sussex, England
- Occupation: Solicitor retired and writer
- Genre: Legal history, biography

John Hostettler (1925–2018) was an English writer of legal histories and biographies.

His best-known creation, Sir William Garrow was used in the making of the BBC drama series, Garrow's Law.

== Early life ==
Hostettler was born in Central Middlesex Hospital and grew up in Acton, West London, with a younger sister Doreen. His father, John Christian, was a fireman and then locomotive engine driver for the Great Western Railway. His mother, Violet, had started work at age thirteen on a milk round. They had married in 1923.

He passed the 11+ exam, attended Acton County School and then became articled to solicitors in Holborn, London. During the Second World War, he volunteered, in 1943, as a Bevin Boy and remained in the South Wales Coalfield for three years.

== Legal career ==
Hostettler qualified as a solicitor in September 1947 and remained a lawyer for thirty-five years. He established his own practice in West London in 1958 and had offices in Ealing, Southall and Covent Garden during his career. He also undertook political and civil liberties cases in Nigeria, Germany and Aden, and played a key role in the abolition of flogging in colonial prisons following a visit to the latter in 1962. He sat as a magistrate from 1976 and also chaired social security appeals tribunals after he retired as a solicitor.

He holds an LL.B. (Hons), an LL.M. and a PhD from the London School of Economics and 2 PhDs from Sussex University.

== Literary career ==
Hostettler has written twenty five books on legal history; current issues such as breaches of the rule of law and trial by jury; and biographies. His literary career began in 1992 when he transformed his first PhD thesis into the book, "The Politics of Criminal Law Reform in the Nineteenth Century." His biographical subjects include leading legal figures Sir Matthew Hale, Sir James Fitzjames Stephen, Sir Edward Carson, Lord Halsbury, Thomas Erskine and William Garrow ( the latter co-written with Richard Braby, a descendant of Garrow.)

His legal history books include histories of criminal justice and the abolition of capital punishment. He has also written about voting in Britain (with Brian Block.) and he was nominated for the Orwell Prize in 2013 for “Dissenters, Radicals, Heretics and Blasphemers.”

Hostettler has also written articles for The Anglo-American Law Review, Justice of the Peace and The Legal Executive.

== Personal life ==
Hostettler married Joy Birch in February 1950 in North West London and they had 3 children. They lived on the coast in West Sussex, although he continued to support Arsenal Football Club. Hostettler died in his sleep at his West Sussex home on 23 October 2018. He was 93.

== Bibliography ==
- The Colour of Injustice. The Mysterious Murder of the Daughter of a High Court Judge (2013, Waterside Press, ISBN 978-1-904380-94-8 e-book: 978-1-908162-38-0)
- Twenty Famous Lawyers (2013, Waterside Press, ISBN 978-1-904380-98-6 e-book: 978-1-908162-53-3)
- Garrow’s Law. The BBC Drama Revisited (2012, Waterside Press, ISBN 978-1-904380-90-0 e-book: 978-1908162-22-9)
- Dissenters, Radicals, Heretics and Blasphemers (2012, Waterside Press, ISBN 978-1-904380-82-5 e-book: 978-1-908162-07-6)
- Champions of the Rule of Law (2011, Waterside Press, ISBN 978-1-904380-68-9 e-book: 978-1-908162-02-1)
- Cesare Beccaria. The Genius of 'On Crimes and Punishments' (2011, Waterside Press, ISBN 978-1-904380-63-4 e-book:978-1-906534-93-6)
- Thomas Erskine and Trial by Jury (Paperback, 2010, Waterside Press, ISBN 978-1-904380-59-7 e-book: 978-1-906534-86-8)
- Sir William Garrow. His Life, Times and Fight for Justice (with Richard Braby) (2010, Waterside Press, ISBN 978-1-904380-55-9)
- A History of Criminal Justice in England and Wales (2009, Waterside Press,ISBN 978-1-904-380-51-1)
- Fighting For Justice The History and Origins of Adversary Trial (2006, Waterside Press, ISBN 1-904380-29-8)
- The Criminal Jury Old and New (2004, Waterside Press, ISBN 1-904-380-11-5)
- Law and Terror in Stalin's Russia (2003, Barry Rose Law Publishers ISBN 1-902681-36-3)
- The Red Gown The Life and Works of Sir Matthew Hale (2002, Barry Rose, ISBN 1-902681-28-2)
- Famous Cases Nine Trials That Changed The Law (with Brian Block) (2002, Waterside Press, ISBN 978-1-872870-34-2)
- Voting in Britain A History of the Parliamentary Franchise (with Brian Block) (2001, Barry Rose, ISBN 1-902681-25-8)
- Lord Halsbury (1998, Barry Rose, ISBN 1-872328-93-8)
- At the Mercy of the State (1998, Barry Rose, ISBN 1-872328-77-6)
- Hanging in the Balance A History of the Abolition of Capital Punishment in Britain (with Brian Block) (1997, Waterside Press, ISBN 1-872870-47-3)
- Sir Edward Coke A Force for Freedom (1997, Barry Rose, ISBN 1-872328-67-9)
- Sir Edward Carson – A Dream Too Far (1997, Barry Rose, ISBN 1-872328-37-7) (Updated and re-published 2000. ISBN 1-902-681-24-X)
- Thomas Erskine and Trial by Jury (1996, Barry Rose, ISBN 1-872328-23-7) (Updated, and re-published by Waterside Press 2010 ISBN 978-1-906534-86-8 e-book)
- Politics and Law in the Life of Sir James Fitzjames Stephen (1995, Barry Rose,ISBN 1-872328-24-5)
- The Politics of Punishment ( 1994, Barry Rose, ISBN 1-872328-12-1)
- Thomas Wakley An Improbable Radical (1993, Barry Rose, ISBN 1-872328-51-2)
- The Politics of Criminal Law Reform in the Nineteenth Century (1992, Barry Rose, ISBN 1-872328-90-3)
