= Bergen Prizes =

The Bergen Prizes were three British merchantmen (Betsy, Union, and Charming Polly) that were captured by Captain Pierre Landais of the USS Alliance and John Paul Jones of the USS Bonhomme Richard in 1779. Landais, who had had numerous disagreements with Jones over the command of the squadron in European waters, sent the vessels to Bergen, Norway. Once there, they were repaired and handed back to the British consul, depriving their captors of the satisfaction of having hurt the enemy and of any hope of being rewarded for their efforts.. However, the subject of indemnity was broached by Jones, who turned up in person at Copenhagen. Ultimately, no payment was made by the Danish government due to the existence of a treaty signed between the English and Danish governments in 1660 that obligated Denmark to England. As a result, no reward was given to the captains or crew of the United States vessels responsible for the capture of the merchantmen until the United States Congress ratified reimbursement to Landais in 1806 and the heirs of Jones in 1848.

== Sources ==
- Dictionary of American History by James Truslow Adams, New York: Charles Scribner's Sons, 1940
- Dictionary of American Naval Fighting Ships, United States Navy, 1959
