= Spanish corvette Galgo (1795) =

History

Spain
- Name: Galgo
- Namesake: Galgo Español
- Builder: Royal Dockyard, Ferrol
- Launched: 1795
- Captured: 23 November 1796

General characteristics
- Class & type: Corvette or brig-sloop
- Tons burthen: bm
- Sail plan: Brig
- Complement: 124 (at capture)
- Armament: 18 × 6-pounder guns + 6 swivel guns (at capture)

Galgo was a brigantine corvette launched at Ferrol in 1795. (Note: Winfield incorrectly links this Galgo to the vessel that became HMS Galgo.) On 23 November 1796 HMS Alarm was cruising off Grenada when she encountered Galgo and captured her. Galgo was under the command of Don Barber. She was sailing from Porto Rico to Trinidada and was carrying 80,335 dollars and provisions for the government at Trinidada. Alarm took Galgo into Grenada.
