= Philip Dundas (ship) =

At least two and possibly three vessels have borne the name Philip Dundas (or Phillip Dundas), named for Philip Dundas (c.1763–1807), a Scottish British East India Company naval officer, president of the East India Marine Board, and superintendent of Bombay. He returned to Britain and became a Member of Parliament before returning to the Far East to become governor of Prince of Wales Island.

== Philip Dundas (1) ==
A brig of 178 tons burthen built at Bombay Dockyard in 1798 for the Bengal Pilot Service. One source has her foundering off Madagascar in 1806 on passage to the Cape of Good Hope. However, another source has her still in service, reporting that on 18 March 1808, a storm drove the pilot schooners Hastings and Philip Dundas on shore such that they could not be got off until the spring tides. On 4 July 1810, Sir Edward Pellew grounded while leaving the Ganges river outbound for China and was wrecked. The passengers were got off the next day, and on 7 July the pilot schooner Philip Dundas came out from Kedgeree and took off the last surviving crew member. A third source reports that she was sold out of government service, but does not give a year. This same source states that Phillip Dundas, of 160 tons and built at Bombay in 1797, was sold and lost at Madagascar.

== Philip Dundas (2) ==
A merchant vessel that the French privateer Confiance, Thomassin, master, Jean Esparon, owner, brought into Mauritius on 10 October 1810. She was described as a three-masted British ship, of 350 to 400 tons, built of teak, and copper-sheathed. Her cargo consisted of 15 cases of opium, 200 pieces of satin, Pekin and blue custine, 150 livres of cloves, etc. When the British captured Île de France on 10 November 1810, among the vessels they found at "Port Napoleon" was "le Philip Dundas, of 300 Tons".

== Philip Dundas (3) ==
...Scarvell, master, was a merchant vessel that wrecked on 19 August 1828. She was on her way from Mauritius when a gale drove her ashore at Port Elizabeth, Algoa Bay. Two men drowned. Unfortunately there is no evidence readily available that either refutes or confirms that this Philip Dundas is the Philip Dundas recaptured in 1810. In any case, in 1824, Philip Dundas had been tangentially involved in a tragic affair. News arrived at Mauritius that the French slaver Lys had wrecked at Providence Island, stranding 105 slaves. Lieutenant-General G.S. Cole, the governor of Mauritius, not having a naval vessel at hand, chartered Philip Dundas to sail to rescue the slaves on the island. Philip Dundas returned without the slaves, reporting that HMS Delight had retrieved them and was bringing them to Mauritius. Unfortunately, Delight foundered on her way to Mauritius with the loss of all 65 crew members aboard, as well as the 103 people she had rescued.
