= Englishman's Bay =

Bay in Tobago

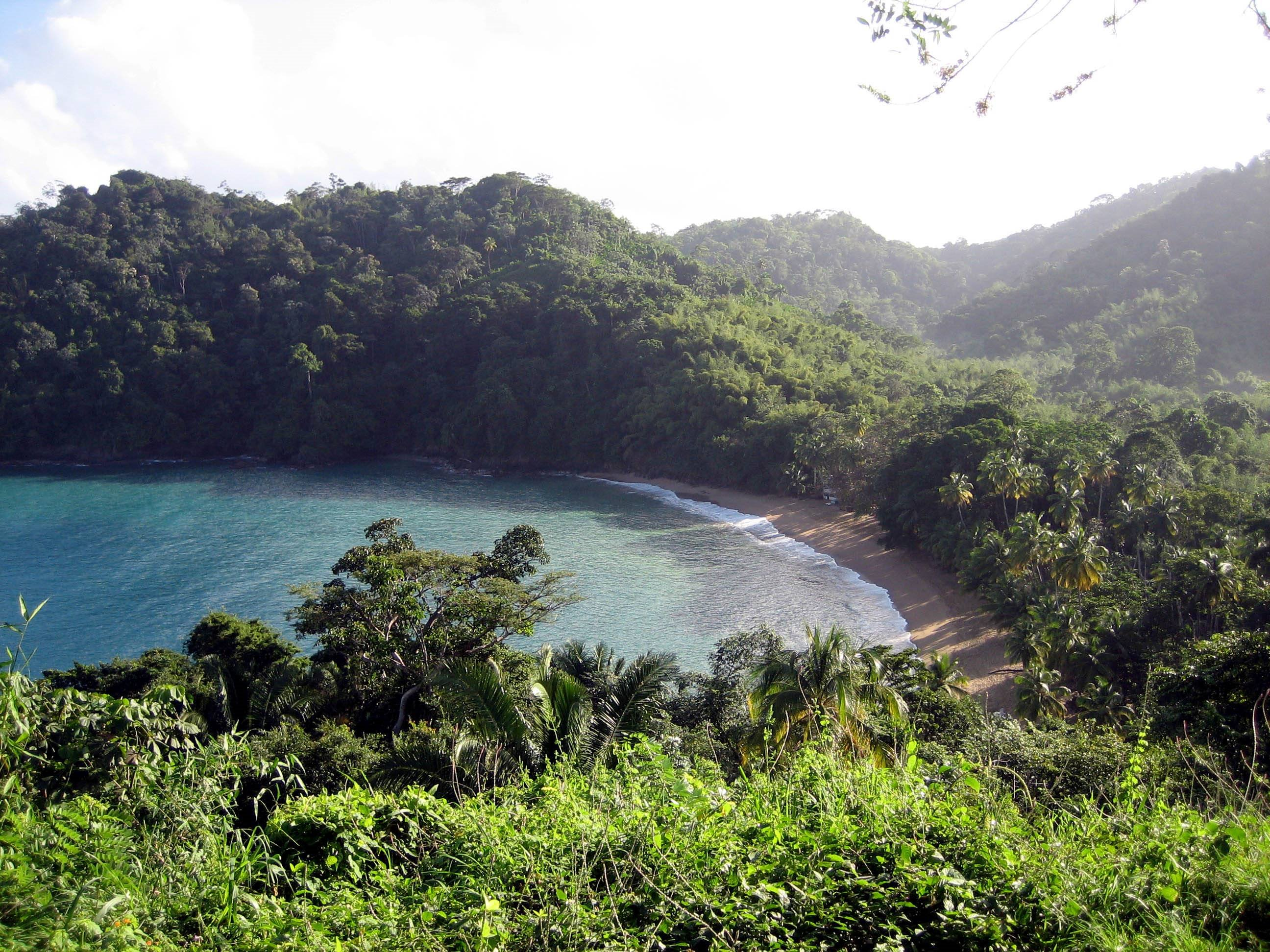
- Interactive map of Englishman's Bay
- Location: Trinidad and Tobago
- Nearest town: Castara
- Coordinates: 11.291229°N 60.670356°W
- Operator: Tobago House of Assembly
- Status: Open all year
- Designation: Public beach

Englishman's Bay is a secluded beach on the leeward coast of Tobago, between Castara and Parlatuvier. Although the bay draws fewer beach-goers that Tobago's western beaches do, it is considered one of the island's most beautiful. The beach itself is a classic crescent shape, capped by two heavily forested headlands descending from Tobago's Main Ridge. The sand starts immediately after the forest ends and is of a shallow to medium gradient and somewhat coarse grain. The beach's size changes little at high or low tides, due to the gradient. There is heavy beach break. Owing to the number of waves, the beach does not boast magnificent snorkeling. As of 2018, there is one small restaurant/gift shop, Eula's, and a single-stall male and female bathroom.
