= William Garrow =

British barrister, politician and judge (1760–1840)

The Right Honourable Sir William Garrow QC FRS
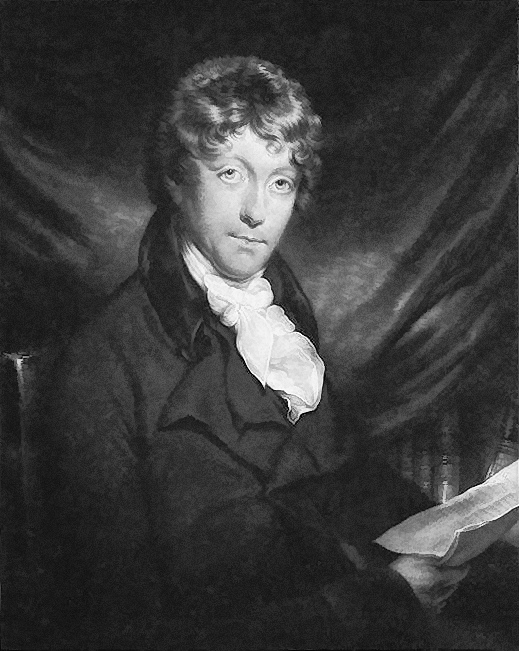
- William Garrow in 1810, aged 50

Solicitor General for England and Wales
- In office June 1812 – May 1813
- Preceded by: Sir Thomas Plumer
- Succeeded by: Sir Robert Dallas

Attorney General for England and Wales
- In office May 1813 – 6 May 1817
- Preceded by: Sir Thomas Plumer
- Succeeded by: Sir Samuel Shepherd

Baron of the Exchequer
- In office 6 May 1817 – 22 February 1832
- Preceded by: Richard Richards
- Succeeded by: John Gurney

Personal details
- Born: 13 April 1760 Hadley, Middlesex, England
- Died: 24 September 1840 (aged 80) Ramsgate, Kent, England
- Party: Whig
- Spouse: Sarah Dore
- Profession: Barrister, politician, Judge

Sir William Garrow, QC, FRS (13 April 1760 – 24 September 1840) was an English barrister, politician and judge known for his indirect reform of the advocacy system, which helped usher in the adversarial court system used in most common law nations today. He introduced the phrase "presumed innocent until proven guilty", insisting that defendants' accusers and their evidence be thoroughly tested in court. Born to a priest and his wife in Monken Hadley, then in Middlesex, Garrow was educated at his father's school in the village before being apprenticed to Thomas Southouse, an attorney in Cheapside, which preceded a pupillage with Mr. Crompton, a special pleader. A dedicated student of the law, Garrow frequently observed cases at the Old Bailey; as a result Crompton recommended that he become a solicitor or barrister. Garrow joined Lincoln's Inn in November 1778, and was called to the Bar on 27 November 1783. He quickly established himself as a criminal defence counsel, and in February 1793 was made a King's Counsel by HM Government to prosecute cases involving treason and felonies.

He was elected to Parliament in 1805 for Gatton, a rotten borough, and became Solicitor General for England in 1812 and Attorney General for England a year later. Although not happy in Parliament, having been returned only for political purposes, Garrow acted as one of the principal Whig spokesmen trying to stop criminal law reform as campaigned for by Samuel Romilly and also attempted to pass legislation to condemn animal cruelty. In 1817, he was made a Baron of the Exchequer and a Serjeant-at-Law, forcing his resignation from Parliament, and he spent the next 15 years as a judge. He was not particularly successful in the commercial cases the Exchequer specialised in, but when on Assize, used his criminal law knowledge from his years at the Bar to great effect. On his resignation in 1832 he was made a Privy Councillor, a sign of the respect HM Government had for him. He died on 24 September 1840.

For much of the 19th and 20th centuries his work was forgotten by academics, and interest arose only in 1991, with an article by John Beattie titled "Garrow for the Defence" in History Today. Garrow is best known for his criminal defence work, which, through the example he set with his aggressive defence of clients, helped establish the modern adversarial system in use in the United Kingdom, the United States, and other former British colonies. Garrow is also known for his impact on the rules of evidence, leading to the best evidence rule. His work was cited as recently as 1982 in the Supreme Court of Canada and 2006 in the Irish Court of Criminal Appeal. In 2009, BBC One broadcast Garrow's Law, a four-part fictionalised drama of Garrow's beginnings at the Old Bailey; a second series aired in late 2010. BBC One began broadcasting the third series in November 2011.

== Early life and education ==
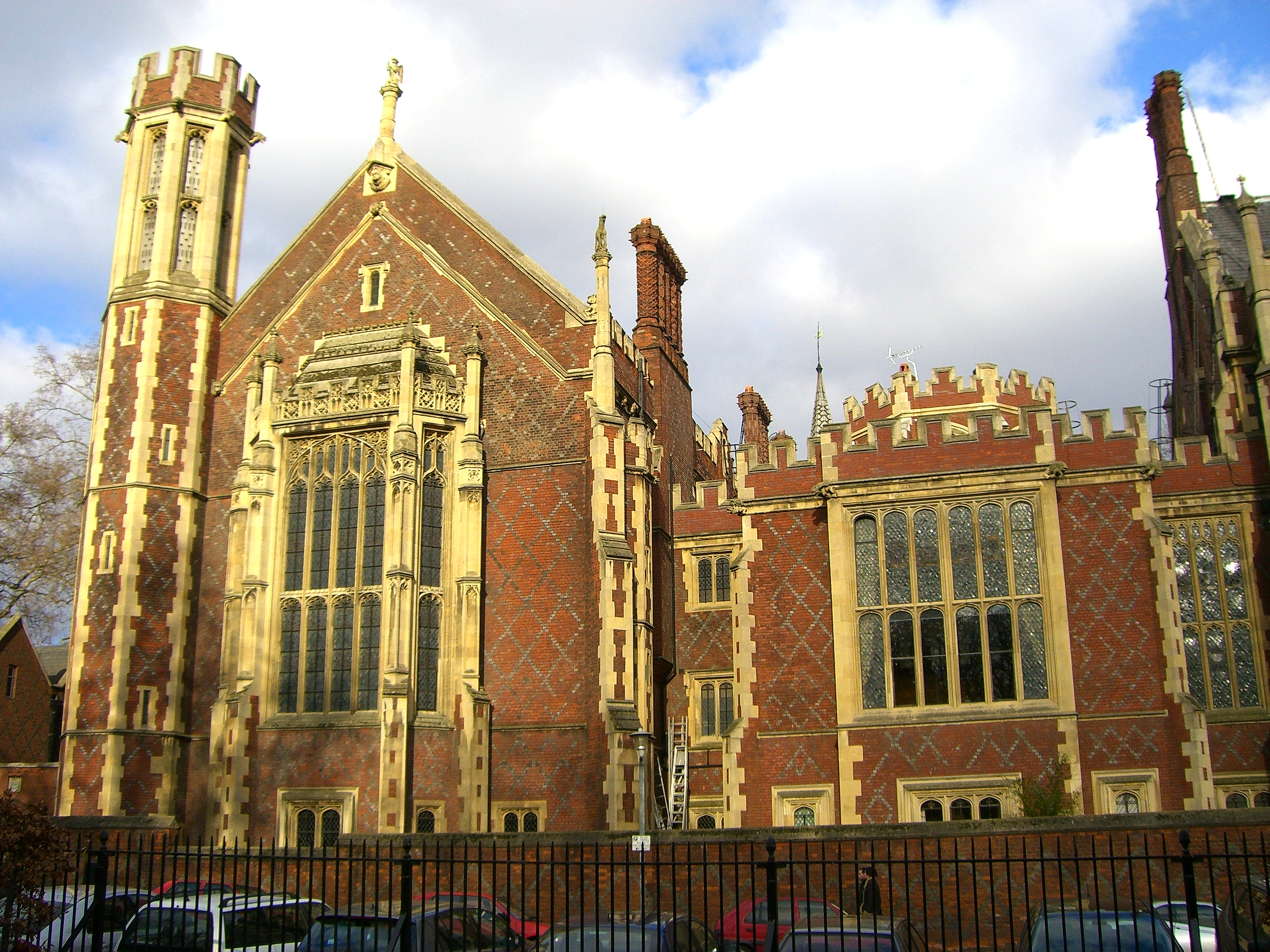
Lincoln's Inn, where Garrow was called to the Bar on 27 November 1783

Garrow's family originally came from Moray, Scotland, where they were descended from the Garriochs of Kinstair, a Scottish royal line. Garrow's father David was born at a farm called Knockside, Aberlour (Speyside) approximately 50 miles northwest of Aberdeen. David graduated from Aberdeen University with a Master of Arts degree on 1 April 1736, and became a priest of the Church of England, creating a school in Monken Hadley, in what's now the Greater London area. His younger brother William became a successful doctor, leaving most of his estate (£30,000) to Garrow. On 5 June 1748 David married Sarah Lowndes, with whom he had eleven children; William, Edward, Eleanora, Jane, John, Rose, William, Joseph, William, David and Anne. The first two Williams died as infants; the third, born on 13 April 1760, survived.

William Garrow was educated at his father's school in Monken Hadley, The Priory, which emphasised preparing students for commercial careers such as in the East India Company. As such, it taught social graces, as well as English, Greek, Latin, French, geography, mathematics and dancing. Studying there Garrow "knew the English language well; had a moderate acquaintance with the Latin and, as an accomplishment, added a considerable proficiency in French". Garrow attended this school until he was 15, at which point he was articled to Thomas Southouse born Faversham, Kent?, an attorney in Cheapside, London. Garrow showed potential, being noted as "attentive and diligent in the performance of the technical and practical duties of the office", and Southouse recommended that he become a solicitor or barrister; as a result, when he was 17, he became a pupil of a Mr. Crompton, a special pleader. As a pupil Garrow studied hard, fastidiously reading Sampson Euer's Doctrina Placitandi, a manual on the Law of Pleading written in legal French. At the same time he viewed cases at the Old Bailey, forming a friendship with the clerk of arraignment there, William Shelton.

In the 18th century, speakers perfected the art of oratory through debating societies, one of the most noted of which met at Coachmaker's Hall, London. Although initially shy (during his first debate, the attendees had to force him from his seat and hold him up while he spoke), he swiftly developed a reputation as a speaker, and was referred to in the press as "Counsellor Garrow, the famous orator of Coachmaker's Hall". In November 1778, Garrow became a member of Lincoln's Inn, one of the four Inns of Court, and on 27 November 1783 at the age of 23 he was called to the Bar; he later became a Bencher of Lincoln's Inn in 1793.

== Career as a barrister ==
=== Defence ===
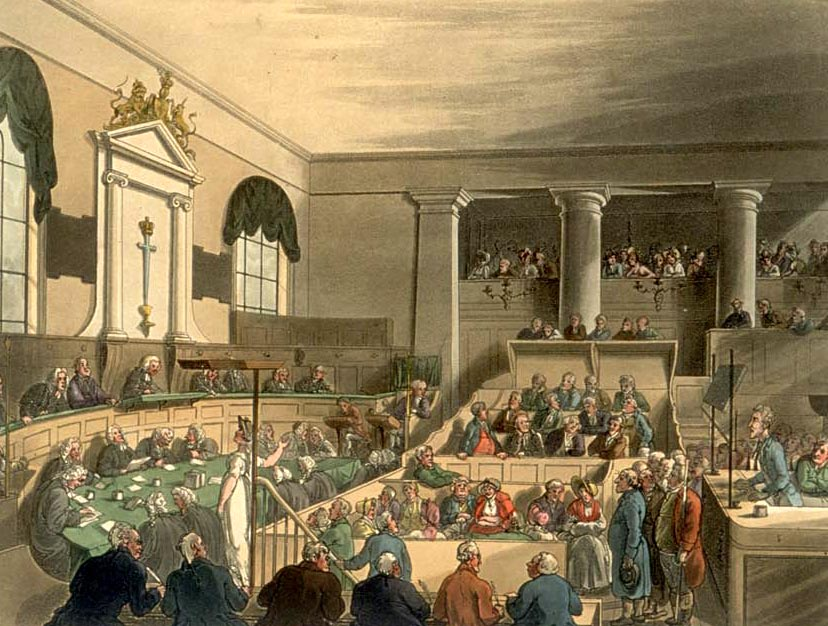
A trial at the Old Bailey, where Garrow began his career as a barrister

Garrow started as a criminal defence barrister at the Old Bailey, in a time where many defendants became increasingly reliant on barristers to prevent their conviction. His first case was actually as a prosecutor; on 14 January 1784, barely two months after he was called to the Bar, he prosecuted John Henry Aikles for obtaining a bill of exchange under false pretences. It was alleged that Aikles had promised to pay Samuel Edwards £100 and a small commission for a £100 bill of exchange, and when he took the bill, failed to hand over the money. Despite Aikles's counsel claiming, according to Edward Foss, that "this was no felony", and being represented by two of the most prestigious criminal barristers of the day, Garrow convinced both the judge and the jury that Aikles was guilty. Garrow later defended Aikles in September 1785, securing his release due to ill-health.

During his early years as a practising barrister, Garrow was particularly noted for his aggressive and confrontational style of cross-examination. When James Wingrove was charged with theft and violence in the course of a highway robbery in 1784, Garrow's cross-examination of William Grove (who acted as a witness and the person charging Wingrove) got him to admit that he was perjuring himself in an attempt to get a reward, and that Wingrove had not robbed the two injured parties. Garrow showed a dislike of most thief-takers, of which Grove was one, although he did not treat the Bow Street Runners and other professionals with contempt. His dislike of such men was highlighted in his defence of three men in 1788 for theft; they were charged with assaulting John Troughton, putting him in fear of his life, and stealing his hat. The issue was whether the assault put him in fear of his life, or whether he was exaggerating to claim a reward, which could not be claimed for simple theft. Garrow established that Troughton was uncertain about how he lost his hat, despite his attempts to claim that the defendants knocked it off him, and after four witnesses gave character evidence the defendants were found not guilty.

Garrow made much use of jury nullification to limit the punishment for his convicted clients, in a time when many crimes carried the death penalty (the so-called Bloody Code). In 1784 a pair of women were arrested for stealing fans worth 15 shillings, meaning a conviction would result in the death penalty; Garrow convinced the jury to convict the women of stealing 4 shillings worth of fans, therefore changing the sentence to twelve months of hard labour.

=== Prosecution ===
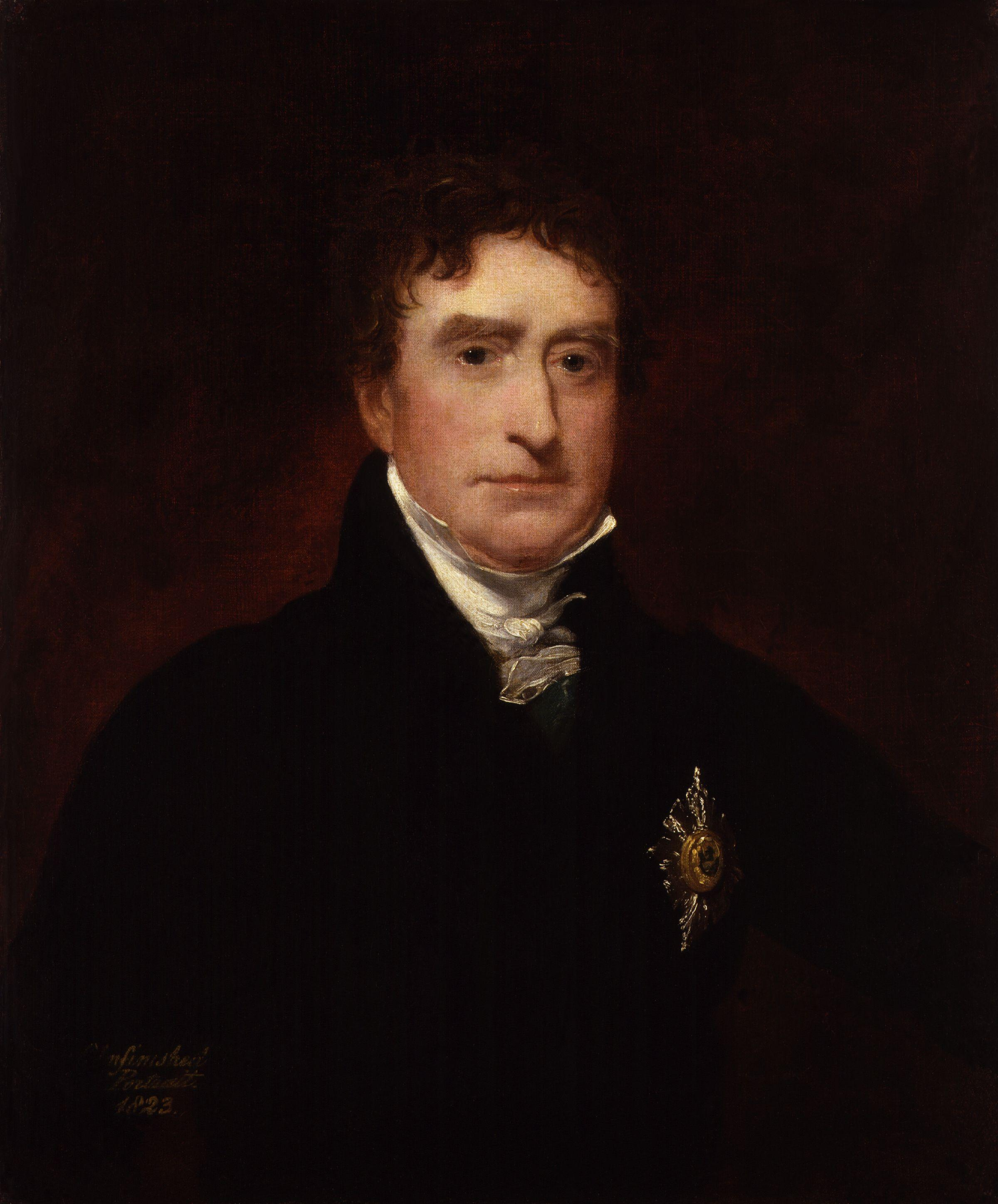
Thomas Erskine, whom Garrow faced in the treason trials of the late 18th century

Garrow soon developed a large practice, working criminal trials at the Old Bailey and outside London as both defence counsel and prosecutor. By 1799, a book recorded that the number of cases he had at the Court of King's Bench "is exceeded by none but Mr. [Thomas] Erskine's", and that "he has long monopolized the chief business on the home circuit... No man is heard with more attention by the court, no man gains more upon a jury, or better pleases a common auditor". In February 1793 he was appointed a King's Counsel to help prosecute those accused of treason and sedition, less than ten years after his call to the Bar; and his appointment was met with a mixed response from the press. The Briton described Garrow and the other five appointments as the best talent of the age, while the Morning Chronicle was bitter due to Garrow's previous status as a friend of the Official Opposition, the Whigs, as opposed to the Tory government.

As the French Revolution and its perceived threat to the United Kingdom gained momentum, so did Garrow's career; he prosecuted in most of the state trials, and as he increased in experience was left to manage many of them himself, coming up against leading barristers such as Thomas Erskine, James Mingay and James Scarlett. In May 1794 the Government suspended habeas corpus, in 1795 outlawed all public meetings, in 1797 outlawed secret organisations and in 1799 outlawed all societies interested in reforming the way the United Kingdom was run. The Government planned a series of 800 arrests, with 300 execution warrants for high treason made out and signed, making a particular effort to prosecute Thomas Hardy and John Horne Tooke. Hardy was the first to be tried, with the prosecution arguing that he sought a revolution in England similar to that in France. With Garrow prosecuting and Erskine defending, the trial lasted eight days instead of the normal one, and the foreman of the jury was so tense that he delivered the verdict of "not guilty" in a whisper and then immediately fainted. Tooke was then prosecuted; again, the jury found him not guilty, with the result that the other 800 trials were abandoned.

During the period when Garrow worked as a barrister, the slavocracy of the British West Indies held large amounts of power in Parliament, allowing them to maintain a monopoly on the sugar trade in Britain which produced a vast amount of profit. This industry was profitable due to the use of Black slave labour, to which Garrow had long been opposed; when the members of the pro-slavocracy West India Committee offered him a job managing their legal and political affairs, he replied that "[even] if your committee would give me their whole incomes, and all their estates, I would not be seen as the advocate of practices which I abhor, and a system which I detest". In 1806, Thomas Picton, the governor of Trinidad, was charged with a single count of "causing torture to be unlawfully inflicted" on 14-year old free woman of color Luisa Calderón; he was brought before the Court of King's Bench under Lord Ellenborough. The court records run to 367 pages, and Garrow was deeply involved as prosecuting counsel; indeed, his opening speech on 24 February 1806 is considered by Braby to be one of his best. The case centred on whether or not Spanish law, which allowed torture, was still in effect at the time of the incident. The jury eventually decided that it was not, and Ellenborough found Picton guilty. Picton's counsel requested a retrial, which was granted; the jury in the second trial eventually decided that Picton was innocent.

Thanks to Garrow's political connections, he was made first Solicitor General and then Attorney General for the Prince of Wales in 1806 and 1807; he was recommended by Erskine, who said in a letter to the Prince that "he knows more of the real justice and policy of everything connected with the criminal law than any man I am acquainted with". In 1812 he prosecuted Leigh Hunt for seditious libel against the Prince Regent; thanks to his work, Hunt was found guilty, reversing the judgment of an 1811 trial in which he had been acquitted.

== Political career ==
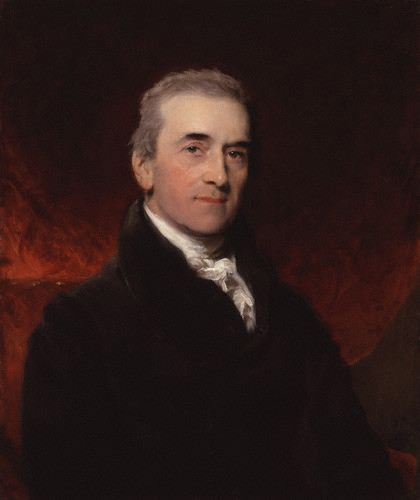
Sir Samuel Romilly, Garrow's frequent opponent in Parliament

Since 1789, the press had been speculating that Garrow, a Whig, would enter Parliament; however he was first elected in 1805 for Gatton. This was a rotten borough, with Garrow appointed to serve the interests of his patron, Charles James Fox. After his entry into politics Garrow at first paid little attention, not making his maiden speech until 22 April 1806, when he opposed a charge for the impeachment of Marquess Wellesley. He spoke again on 18 June 1806 on a legal technicality, and after that did not intervene for another six years. Braby and other sources indicate that he did not enjoy his time in Parliament, and was rarely there unless required to conduct some business.

In June 1812, he was appointed Solicitor General for England, receiving the customary knighthood, and, in May 1813, he was appointed Attorney General. The Attorney General was the senior Crown prosecutor, during a time when the Prince Regent feared liberal changes to the criminal law and Parliamentary structure. Garrow, as "a mere creature of the Regent", could be trusted to oppose this; rather than the progressive, defensive work undertaken in his early career, this period was one of conservative aggression against the reformers. Garrow ran particularly foul of Sir Samuel Romilly, who was one of those looking to reform a penal code many claimed was not working. On 5 April 1813, Romilly's Bill on Attainder of Treason and Felony came before Parliament. Its intent was to remove corruption of the blood from cases involving treason and felony; Garrow, then Solicitor General, declared that the Bill would remove one of the safeguards of the British Constitution. The Bill eventually failed, and corruption of the blood was not removed from English law until the Forfeiture Act 1870. He also served as Chief Justice of Chester from 1814 to 1817.

Garrow also became involved in the repeal of the Corn Laws, voting for the measure, and sponsored legislation to control surgical practice in the United Kingdom; the bill did not, however, pass into law. In the early 19th century animal cruelty was widespread; Garrow was one of those who found it appalling, and sponsored a bill in 1816 to increase the penalties for riding horses until their severe injury or death. While defeated, his actions were vindicated by a bill of 1820 introduced by Thomas Erskine, which was given the Royal Assent and came into law. Garrow eventually resigned as Attorney General and as a member of parliament in 1817, when he was appointed one of the Barons of the Exchequer.

== Judicial career ==
Garrow's first judicial appointment came in 1814, when he was made Chief Justice of Chester. This was opposed by Sir Samuel Romilly, who argued that the positions of Chief Justice and Attorney General were incompatible, saying "to appoint a gentleman holding a lucrative office at the sole pleasure of the Crown to a high judicial situation, was extremely inconsistent with that independence of the judicial character which it was so important to preserve inviolate". On 6 May 1817, Garrow was made a Baron of the Exchequer and Serjeant-at-Law, succeeding Richard Richards, and resigning his seat in Parliament and his position as Attorney General. He was not a particularly distinguished judge in the Exchequer, mainly due to a lack of knowledge of the finer points of law. Practising on the Assize Circuits, however, was a different matter; dealing with his more familiar criminal law rather than the commercial law of the Exchequer, Garrow performed far better. Braby indicates that he regularly amazed both barristers and defendants with his knowledge of the intricacies of crime. Garrow retired on 22 February 1832, replaced by John Gurney, and was made a Privy Councillor on retirement as a measure of the Government's respect for him. He died at home on 14 September 1840, aged 80.

== Personal life ==
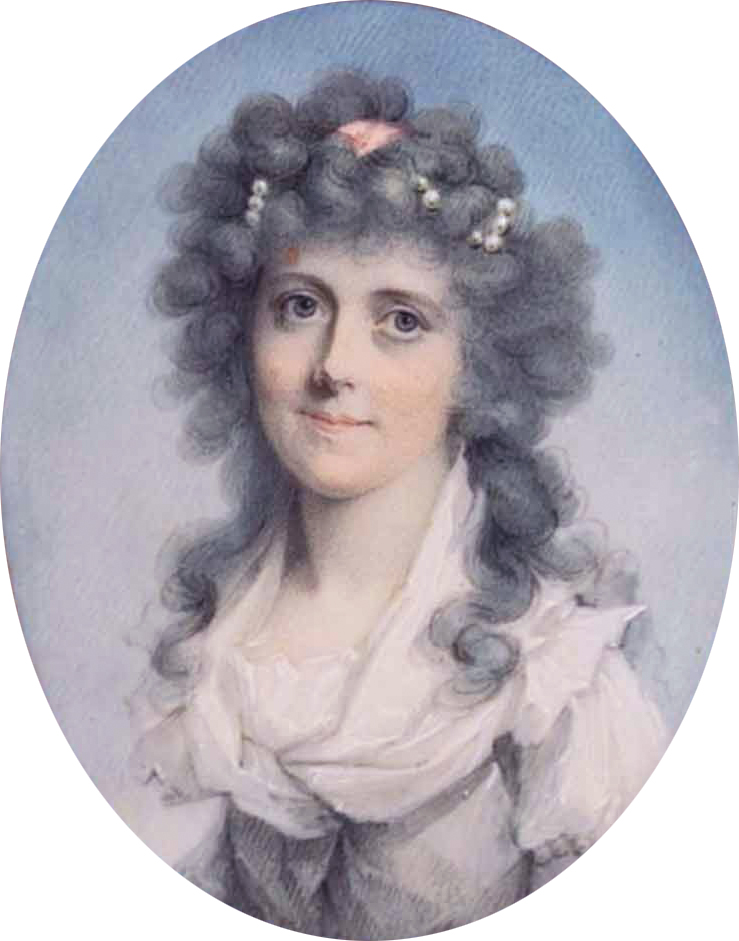
Sarah Garrow

Garrow had an irregular relationship with Sarah Dore, who had previously borne a son, William Arthur Dore Hill, by Arthur Hill, Viscount Fairford in 1778. Thomas Hague has suggested that Dore was an Irish noblewoman Garrow had seduced, but the only intent of his writings was to disparage Garrow, and there is no evidence to support his claim. Their first child, David William Garrow, was born on 15 April 1781, and their second, Eliza Sophia Garrow, was born on 18 June 1784. Garrow and Dore finally married on 17 March 1793. Sarah was noted as particularly elegant, and was actively involved in local matters in Ramsgate, where the family lived. She died on 30 June 1808 after a long illness, and was buried at the Church of St Margaret, Darenth. David William Garrow was educated at Christ Church, Oxford, earning the degree of Doctor of Divinity, and served as one of the Chaplains to the Prince of Wales. His son, Edward Garrow, was a cricketer and clergyman. Eliza Sophia Garrow married Samuel Fothergill Lettsom; one of her children, also named William Garrow, served as the Consul-General of Uruguay.

== Legacy ==
Garrow's estate was valued at £22,000 after his death near Ramsgate, Kent, including £12,000 in the Bank of England, £5,000 in three insurance policies and £5,000 secured by mortgages – a total of £1,938,000 in 2025 terms. Garrow's will was written in 1830 and contained only two demands; to set up a trust and to be buried in his birthplace, Hadley, with his uncle, his father's younger brother William (who had left Garrow the best part of his fortune). The trust contained his entire estate, with the trustees being Leonard Smith, a merchant, Edward Lowth Badeley of Paper Buildings, Inner Temple and William Nanson Lettsom of Gray's Inn. The money was divided between Joseph Garrow, Garrow's nephew, who received £1,000, £200 to each of the children of Garrow's sister, £2,000 to the sister and £300 a year to the widow of Garrow's son. Eliza, Garrow's daughter, received £300 a year from the interest on the trust, with an additional provision of £200 for the joint use of Eliza and her husband. The estate was structured by a legal professional, and as such no death duties were paid. The second instruction was ignored: Garrow was buried in the churchyard of St Laurence, Ramsgate, his parish church.

Edward Foss described him as "one of the most successful advocates of his day", something linked more to his "extraordinary talent" at cross-examination than his knowledge of the law; Garrow once told a witness before a case that "you know a particular fact and wish to conceal it – I'll get it out of you!" Lord Brougham, who regularly opposed him in court, wrote that "no description can give the reader an adequate idea of this eminent practitioner's powers in thus dealing with a witness". Lemmings notes Garrow as not only a formidable advocate but also the "first lawyer to establish a reputation as a defence barrister".

Garrow was largely forgotten; although Robert Louis Stevenson and his wife discovered his work a generation later when reading transcripts of Old Bailey cases, there was little academic work on him until the late 20th century. In 1991, John Beattie published "Garrow for the Defence" in History Today, followed by "Scales of Justice: Defence Counsel and the English Criminal Law in the Eighteenth and Nineteenth Centuries" in Law and History Review. Allyson May, who did her doctoral study under Beattie, further extended the analysis of Garrow's work with The Bar and the Old Bailey: 1750–1850, published in 2003.

Garrow's work was cited in court as recently as 1982, when the Supreme Court of Canada quoted a passage from The Trial of William Davidson and Richard Tidd for High Treason, where Garrow instructed the jury as to how to interpret testimony, in Vetrovec v The Queen in 1982. In 2006 he was again quoted, when the Irish Court of Criminal Appeal used the same work in their review of the 1982 conviction of Brian Meehan for the murder of Veronica Guerin.

In 2009, BBC One broadcast Garrow's Law, a four-part fictionalised drama of Garrow's beginnings at the Old Bailey, starring Andrew Buchan as Garrow. A second series, again of four parts, was aired in late 2010, and the third and final four-part series was broadcast in November and December 2011.

== Impact ==
=== Adversarial system ===
It is indisputable that Garrow massively affected the modern, adversarial court system used in several western nations and the rules of evidence, although he was barely aware of it. Prior to Garrow's time, defendants in felony cases were not allowed to have defence counsel; as a result, every defendant for arson, rape, robbery, murder and most forms of theft was forced to defend themselves. The first step away from this was with the Treason Act 1695 (for regulating trials in cases of treason), which allowed treason defendants the right to a counsel. Garrow's practice was a further step forward; with his aggressive and forthright style of cross-examination, he promoted a more committed defence of clients, and indirectly reformed the process of advocacy in the 18th century. His area of advocacy (he was counsel for the defence in 83% of his cases) and style is considered key by Beattie in establishing the "new school" of advocacy; his aggressive style in defence set a new style for advocates to follow that assisted in counteracting a legal system biased against the defendant. While he was not the sole cause of this reform, his position at the head of the Bar meant that he served as a highly visible example for new barristers to take after. In some ways Garrow was far ahead of his time; he coined the phrase "innocent until proven guilty" in 1791, although the jury refused to accept this principle and it was not confirmed by the courts until much later.

=== Evidence ===
Garrow also influenced the rules of evidence, which were only just beginning to evolve when he started his career. His insistence that hearsay and copied documents could not be admitted in evidence led to the best evidence rule. He was crucial in insisting on the autonomy of lawyers when adducing evidence, in one case openly arguing with the trial judge to insist that the advocates have independence in submitting it. During this period, the use of partisan medical experts was particularly problematic. While medical experts were regularly called at the Old Bailey, the use of partisan experts was resisted, and at the beginning experts were given limited authority. While this increased towards the end of the 17th century, in line with the judges' increasing desire for certainty and facts, Garrow is noted as an excellent example of the attitude lawyers took when cross-examining such witnesses. When defending Robert Clark, accused of killing John Delew by kicking him in the stomach, Garrow used a mixture of aggressive cross-examination and medical knowledge to get the prosecution's medical expert to admit that he could not prove how Delew had died. Garrow and later advocates learned how to effectively "interrogate" such witnesses, strengthening their own arguments (when it was their expert) or demolishing those of others (when it was an expert attached to the other side).

== Bibliography ==
- Beattie, J.M. (1991). "Scales of Justice: Defense Counsel and the English Criminal Trial in the Eighteenth and Nineteenth Centuries". Law and History Review. 9 (2). University of Illinois Press: 221–267. doi:10.2307/743649. ISSN 0738-2480. JSTOR 743649. S2CID 143698759.
- Braby, Richard; John Hostettler (2010). Sir William Garrow: His Life, His Times and Fight for Justice. Waterside Press. ISBN 978-1-904380-55-9.
- Foss, Edward (1865). Tabulae Curiales. London: J. Murray. OCLC 7481008.
- Foss, Edward (1870). A Biographical Dictionary of the Justices of England (1066–1870). Spottiswoode and Company. OCLC 181068114.
- "Obituary: Rt. Hon. Sir William Garrow". Gentleman's Magazine. 14. London. December 1840.
- Hostettler, John (2006). Fighting for Justice: The History and Origins of Adversary Trial. Waterside Press. ISBN 1-904380-29-8.
- Hostettler, John (2008). A History of Criminal Justice in England and Wales. Waterside Press. ISBN 978-1-904380-51-1.
- Landsman, Stephan (1998). "One Hundred Years of Rectitude: Medical Witnesses at the Old Bailey, 1717–1817". Law and History Review. 16 (3). University of Illinois Press: 445–494. doi:10.2307/744241. ISSN 0738-2480. JSTOR 744241. S2CID 145523420.
- Langbein, John H. (1996). "Historical Foundations of the Law of Evidence: A View from the Ryder Sources". Columbia Law Review. 96 (5). Columbia Law School: 1168–1202. doi:10.2307/1123403. ISSN 0010-1958. JSTOR 1123403.
- Lemmings, David (2004). "Review: The Bar and the Old Bailey, 1750–1850 by Allyson N. May". Albion: A Quarterly Journal Concerned with British Studies. 36 (4). North American Conference on British Studies. ISSN 0095-1390.
- May, Allyson Nancy (2003). The Bar and the Old Bailey, 1750–1850. UNC Press. ISBN 0-8078-2806-8.
- Moore, Christopher (1997). The Law Society of Upper Canada and Ontario's lawyers, 1797–1997. University of Toronto Press. ISBN 0-8020-4127-2.
- Polson, Archer; James Grant (1840). Law and Lawyers: or, Sketches and Illustrations of Legal History and Biography. Vol. 2. Brown, Green & Longmans. OCLC 4342654.
- Richards, J. (1832). The legal Observer. Vol. 3. J. Richards. OCLC 64144220.

Parliament of the United Kingdom
Preceded by Sir Mark Wood; Philip Dundas	Member of Parliament for Gatton; 1805–1806; With: Sir Mark Wood	Succeeded by Sir Mark Wood; James Athol Wood
Preceded by Paul Orchard; Ambrose St John	Member of Parliament for Callington; 1806–1807; With: William Wickham	Succeeded by Lord Binning; Thomas Carter
Preceded by Mark Singleton; Charles Arbuthnot	Member of Parliament for Eye; 1812–1817; With: Mark Singleton	Succeeded by Mark Singleton; Sir Robert Gifford
Legal offices
Preceded by William Adam	Attorney-General of the Duchy of Cornwall; 1806–1812	Succeeded by Joseph Jekyll
Preceded by Thomas Plumer	Solicitor General; 1812–1813	Succeeded by Sir Robert Dallas
Preceded by Thomas Plumer	Attorney General; 1813–1817	Succeeded by Sir Samuel Shepherd
Preceded by Richard Richards	Baron of the Exchequer; 1817–1832	Succeeded by John Gurney
