= Edward Garrow =

English cricketer

Personal information
- Full name: Edward William Garrow
- Born: 18 October 1815; Monken Hadley, Middlesex, England
- Died: 29 March 1896 (aged 80); Bilsthorpe, Nottinghamshire, England
- Batting: Unknown

Domestic team information
- Years: Team
- 1839: Oxford University

Career statistics
| Competition | First-class |
|---|---|
| Matches | 1 |
| Runs scored | 0 |
| Batting average | 0.00 |
| 100s/50s | –/– |
| Top score | 0 |
| Catches/stumpings | –/– |
- Source: Cricinfo, 9 March 2020

Edward William Garrow (18 October 1815 – 29 March 1896) was an English first-class cricketer and clergyman.

The son of The Reverend David William Garrow, he was born in October 1815 at Monken Hadley, Middlesex. He was educated at Charterhouse School, before matriculating at Brasenose College, Oxford in 1834, graduating B.A. in 1839 and M.A. in 1842. While studying at Oxford, he made a single appearance in first-class cricket for Oxford University against the Marylebone Cricket Club at Lord's in 1839. Batting once in the match, Garrow was run out without scoring in the Oxford first-innings. After graduating from Oxford, Garrow took holy orders in the Church of England. His first ecclesiastical posting was as perpetual curate at Compton Abdale, Gloucestershire from 1847 to 1867. From 1867, he was the rector of Bilsthorpe, Nottinghamshire. He died there in March 1896. His grandfather was Sir William Garrow.
