= Sir Mark Wood, 1st Baronet =

British army officer (1750–1829)

Sir Mark Wood, 1st Baronet (16 March 1750 – 6 February 1829) was a British army officer and engineer. He was a Member of Parliament (MP) for Milborne Port, Gatton and Newark. He received a baronetcy on 3 October 1808.

== Biography ==
Mark Wood was the eldest son of Alexander Wood of Perth, descended from the family of the Woods of Largo, to the estates of which Alexander succeeded on the death of his cousin, John Wood, sometime governor of the Isle of Man. Mark became a cadet of the East India Company's army in 1770, and went to India with his brother George (afterwards a major-general of the Indian army and K.C.B.), who died in 1824. Another brother was Sir James Athol Wood.

He received his first commission on 7 July 1772, in the Bengal engineers, and rose to be colonel 26 February 1795. After a distinguished career in India, culminating in his appointment as surveyor-general in 1787 and chief engineer of Bengal in 1790, he returned to England on account of ill-health in 1793, and purchased Piercefield House on the banks of the Wye. Wood entered the House of Commons for Milborne Port, Somerset, in 1794; he was returned for Newark in 1796, after a severe contest with Sir William Paxton. In 1795 he was brought into the king's service as a colonel, and in an audience he had that year with George III to present a model in ivory of Fort William, Calcutta, the king expressed to him a desire for the union of the East India Company and the royal services. In 1802 he was unsuccessful in a contest with Robert Hurst for the representation of Shaftesbury, and was in consequence returned for his pocket borough of Gatton, Surrey, the domain of which (Gatton Park) he had recently purchased. He was created a baronet on 3 October 1808. He continued to represent Gatton until the dissolution in 1818, when he retired from public life, having given a uniform support to the measures of Pitt and subsequently of Lord Liverpool.

He died on 6 February 1829 at his house in Pall Mall, London and was buried on 13 February in Gatton church, where there is a tablet to his memory. By a relationship in India with a woman of colour (not formalised under English law) he had a daughter, Maria Wood, who in 1798 married a Major James Blackwell. In 1797 under a deed of trust Wood secured £3,375 to his daughter on his death, and In 1809 provided her with a house in Calcutta.

Wood married at Calcutta, on 17 May 1786, Rachel (died 1802), daughter of Robert Dashwood, and by her had two sons—Alexander (died 1805), cornet 11th dragoons; and Mark, who succeeded him and was also Member of Parliament for Gatton; he married, in 1833, Elizabeth Rachel, daughter of William Newton, but died in 1837, when the title became extinct. The estates passed to George, eldest son of Sir Mark's second brother, Sir George Wood.

Baronetage of the United Kingdom
New creation	Baronet (of Gatton); 1808–1829	Succeeded by Mark Wood
