= USS Duc de Lauzun =

History

United States
- Name: USS Duc de Lauzun
- Namesake: Armand Louis de Gontaut, Duc de Lauzun
- Acquired: October 1782
- Fate: Lent to France, April 1783, later sold

General characteristics
- Type: Frigate
- Armament: 20 cannon

USS Duc de Lauzun was a 20-gun frigate of the Continental Navy commissioned in 1782 when she was bought until 1783 when it was sold in France.

== Service ==
Formerly a British customs ship, USS Duc De Lauzun was purchased in October 1782 at Dover, England, and outfitted in Nantes, France.

Robert Morris, Agent of Marine, acquired Duc de Lauzun in October 1782 in payment for a debt.

Under the command of Captain John Green, a naval officer of the Continental Navy, she was dispatched from Philadelphia, Pa. in January 1783, to bring home 72,000 Spanish milled dollars from Havana for the American Government. Clearing Havana 6 March escorted by the Continental ship Alliance under the command of Captain John Barry, she sailed for home with her precious cargo. On their passage north the two ships encountered two men-of-war whom they evaded.

Under orders to deliver the cargo at all costs, Alliance distanced herself from Duc de Lauzun which was laden with the silver, and much needed cargo bound for America causing the two British warships to close on Green's vessel. After consulting, the two captains agreed that Green would abandon most of his cannon, and transfer most of the silver to Alliance. Duc was still too slow, and Barry gave the orders to abandon Duc and sail away with the silver. Courageously Captain Green opened fire with what cannon he had against one of the British vessels, while another was closing quickly. Duc de Lauzon was a transport outfitted with 20 cannon far inferior to Alliance, and the British, and without most of her cannon. Barry witnessing the events, and the fact that Green was one of his closest friends, turned Alliance to come to Duc de Lauzun's assistance. Positioning Alliance between Duc and one of the British warships, Barry delivered a broadside that sent the British into a retreat. Barry, still insistent on following orders, left Green and Duc de Lauzun, still laden with a fortune of much needed goods. With good fortune Duc was able to sail safely up the coast into Philadelphia. Barry lured British vessels away from the entrance of Delaware Bay allowing Green to sail up the Delaware to Philadelphia.

Barry publicly questioned his close friend on the accusation of Captain Green's self-interest in the incident due to captain's privilege slowing Duc de Lauzun during the voyage. The cargo on board Duc amounted to a small fortune, worth nearly the same amount as the silver. The cargo, owed to several investors was critical to the economy, and supplied much needed goods to the colonies. Captain Green during the voyage and battle was never to abandon his cargo, and the lives of his men. Captain Green expressed his anger to Barry in a meeting at sea questioned Barry's decision to leave Duc defenseless without cannon, and abandoning his fellow sailors and the much needed cargo. Duc was the first to fire in the battle owing to Captain Green's uncommon valor while Barry was sailing away. Only concern at having to watch Duc de Lauzun's capture led Barry to get involved in the battle. Captain Green was exonerated of any wrongdoing in which his so-called good friend had implied. Captain Green still considered John Paul Jones, Gustavus Cunningham, Peter Hodgekinson, and John Barry his closest friends after the war. The battle was the last of the war.

Duc de Lauzun and her crew performed valiantly. The following year Captain Green was chosen by Robert Morris to Captain Empress of China, the first vessel to fly the flag of the United States of America, and sail to China establishing trade between the two countries vital to the growth and prosperity of the nation.

In April 1783 the United States government lent Duc de Lauzun to France to carry home French troops. Before, she had one more mission: to carry Benjamin Franklin to France carrying the news of Cornwallis's surrender.

The last French forces in America, (Lauzun's Legion and the siege artillery), embarked at Wilmington (Delaware) on 11 May 1783 on the frigates Astrée, Danaé, and Gloire, and the transports Saint James and Duc de Lauzun.

== Fate ==
On 21 April 1783, Congress instructed Robert Morris to arrange for the sale of Duc De Lauzun when she arrived in France. She was sold there at the end of 1783.
