= Mary Sidney (disambiguation) =

Mary Sidney (1561 – 1621) was a Countess of Pembroke.

Mary Sidney may also refer to:

- Mary Dudley, Lady Sidney (c. 1530–1535 – 1586)
- Lady Mary Wroth née Sidney (1587–1651/3), poet
