= Wilton Circle =

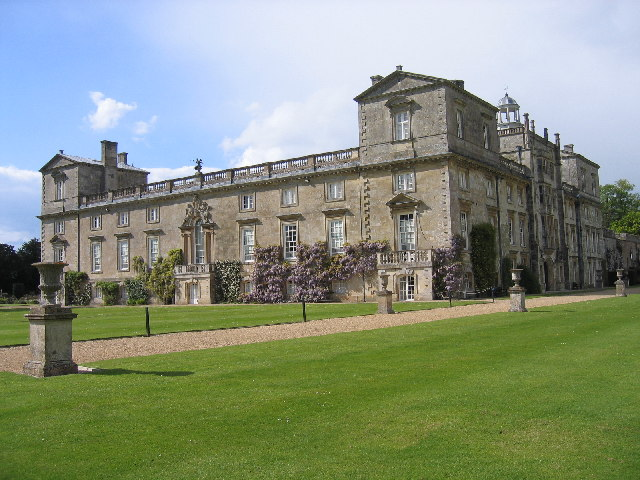
Wilton House

The Wilton Circle were an influential group of 16th-century English poets, led by Mary Sidney. They were based at Wilton House, Wiltshire, which was run by the half-brother of Walter Raleigh. Sidney turned Wilton into a "paradise for poets", and the circle included Edmund Spenser, Michael Drayton, Sir John Davies, Abraham Fraunce, and Samuel Daniel.

They are described as "the most important and influential literary circle in English history" and Mary Sidney has been called a "patroness of the muses".

== See also ==
Areopagus, a similar group centered around Mary's brother, Philip Sidney
