= Areopagus (poetry) =

The Areopagus is a proposed 16th-century society or club dedicated to the reformation of English poetry. The club may have involved figures such as Edmund Spenser, Gabriel Harvey, Edward Dyer and Sir Phillip Sidney. The existence of the Areopagus as a formal society was first noted by Henry Richard Fox Bourne in 1862 in his Memoir of Sir Philip Sidney. There is no direct evidence that the group was more than an idea found in the correspondence between Spenser and Harvey, and if it existed its membership is uncertain.

== Background ==
The first documented meeting between Sir Phillip Sidney and Gabriel Harvey occurred in the summer of 1578 at Audley End. Soon afterwards, Harvey secured a place for his friend Edmund Spenser in the house of the Earl of Leicester, Sidney's uncle, facilitating an acquaintance between the young poets. During Spenser's time with Leicester he also became acquainted with Edward Dyer. Harvey was in correspondence with all three, and classical metre was a frequent topic of discussion. In 1579 Spenser dedicated The Shepheardes Calender to Sidney. Both Spenser and Sidney were given to the idea of reforming English verse.

In a letter dated October 1579, Spenser wrote to Harvey:

As for the twoo worthy Gentlemen, Master Sidney and Master Dyer, that haue me, I thanke them, in some use of familiarity : of whom, and to whome, what speach passeth for youre credite and estimation, I leaue your self to conceiue, hauing alwayes so well conceiued of my vnfained affection and zeale towardes you. And nowe they haue proclaimed in their [Areopagus] a generall surceasing and silence of balde Rymers, and also of the verie beste to : in steade whereof, they haue, by authoritie of their whole Senate, prescribed certaine Lawes and rules of Quantities of English sillables for English Verse : hauing had thereof already great practise, and drawen mee to their faction.

== Conception ==
Referring to Spenser's 1579 letter, H. R. Bourne was first to claim that the Areopagus was "a sort of club" of which "Sidney appears to have been president". Fox also noted similarity in the style and project of alleged Areopagus members, including Spenser, Harvey and Abraham Fraunce, leading him to conclude that Sidney was attempting to establish "a new school of poetry".

== Legacy ==
By the early 20th century, scholars such as Edward Fulton and Howard Maynadier had begun to question the assumptions upon which the notion of the Areopagus as a formal club rested. Fulton asserted that Spenser's remark to Harvey was "more than probably meant to be taken as a jest".

Although academic interest in the Areopagus has continued to wane, the label remains as a critical shorthand for a group of poets that included Spenser, Harvey, Dyer and Sidney. As literary critics use the term, it refers to the general project of these poets to broaden English prosody by incorporating French, Italian, Classical, and Anglo-Saxon models.

== See also ==
Wilton Circle, a similar group centered around Philip Sidney's sister, Mary Sidney
