= Sidney Psalms =

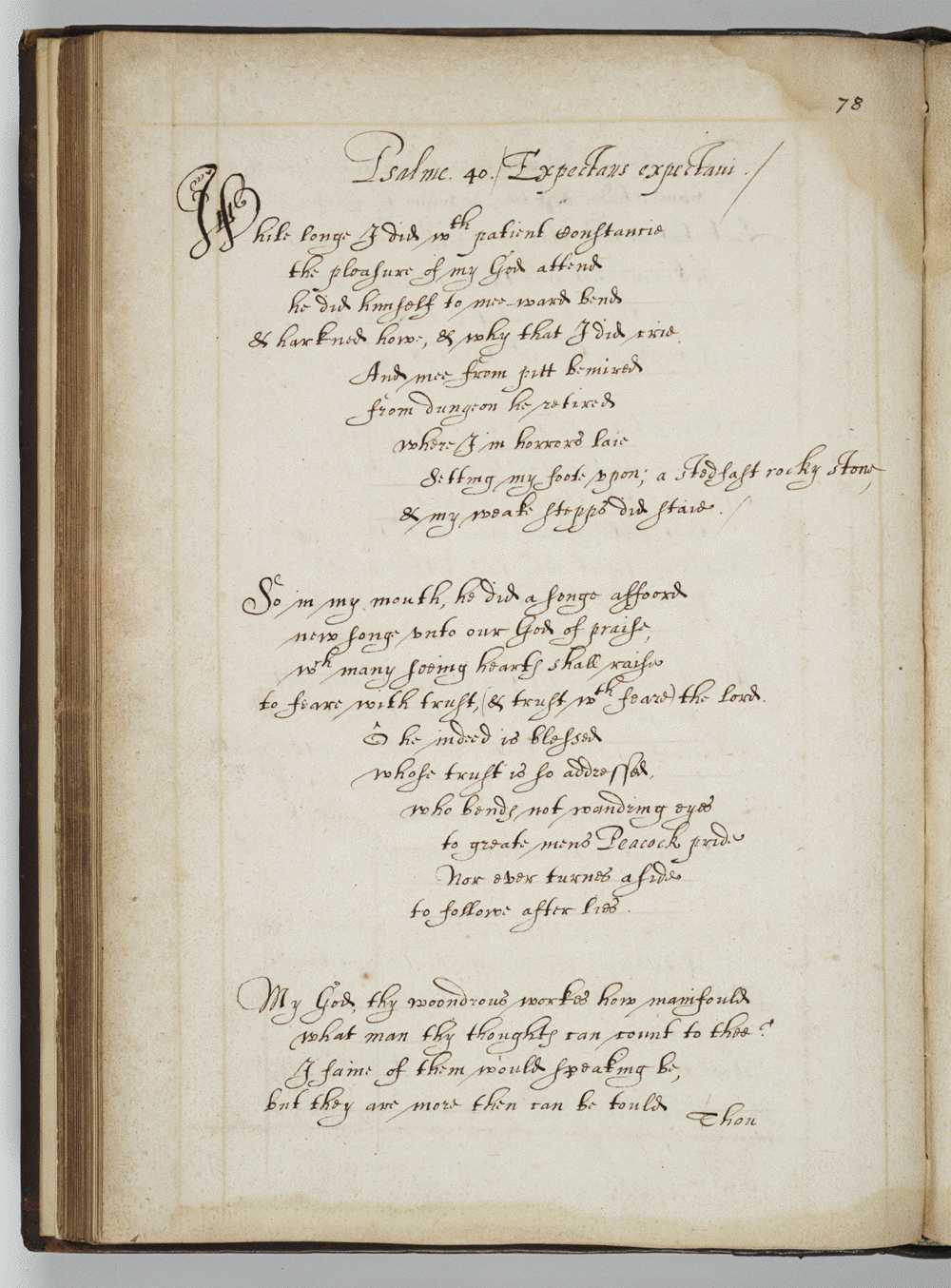
- Psalm 40
- Author: Philip Sidney and Mary Sidney
- Language: English
- Genre: Psalters
- Publication date: 16th-century
- Pages: 142
- ISBN: 0856359831 Open Library

The Sidney or Sidneian Psalms are a 16th-century Biblical paraphrase of the Psalms in English verse, the work of Philip and Mary Sidney, aristocratic siblings who were influential Elizabethan poets. The Psalms were published after Philip's death in 1586 and a copy was presented to Queen Elizabeth I of England in 1599. The translation was praised in the work of John Donne.

== Psalm 1 ==
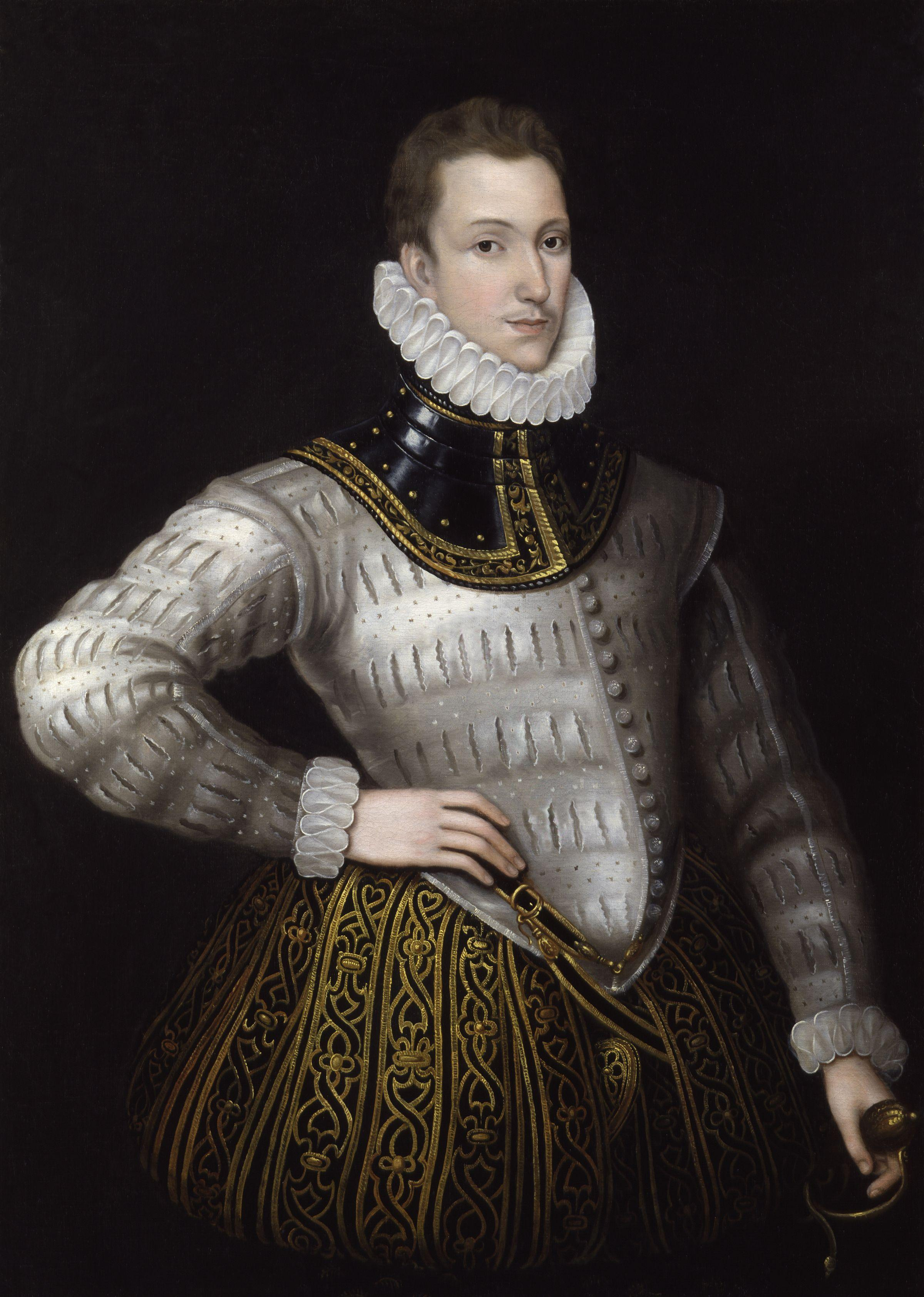
Sir Philip Sidney after Antonis Mor

Psalm 1 is the first in the Sidney Psalter and was written by Philip Sidney in the late 16th century. This is a poetic adaptation of the psalm in the biblical Book of Psalms. The Sidney psalms differ from other psalm translations from the Renaissance period in their focus on aesthetics. Though some claim this detracts from true translation they are still praised today for their creative poetic forms. Of the contemporaries, John Donne praised them as "The highest matter in the noblest form".

=== Themes ===
The first psalm sets up themes which recur through the Psalter:

==== Separation of sinful from righteous ====
The Book of Psalms, including the Sidney Psalter, is concerned with being righteous. Psalms 31 and 51 contain pious apologies which blame God (Psalm 22) and others (Psalm 109), when people are not completely sinless. There is a recurring theme of judgement to separate sinners from the righteous. This begins Psalm 1, where the wheat is literally sorted from the "chaff" – "the wicked, but like chaff".

"Not with the just, be their meetings placed". Examples of this recurrent theme include:

Psalm 11:

"on them: storms, brimstone, coals he rains:
that is their share assigned.
But so of happy other side."

Psalm 145:

"He will his lovers all preserve;
He will the wicked all destroy."

The righteous and the sinful may be separated by the path they choose. Psalm 1 sees two paths laid out for man, "ruin's way" where "wicked counsel leads," or the way of God. This Psalm shares the motif of paths or "the way", especially choosing the right path, with the Bible; the opening line of Psalm 1 refers to "tread[ing]" the right path. This path can be seen as the beginning of a journey the psalms and through this lyrical Psalter.

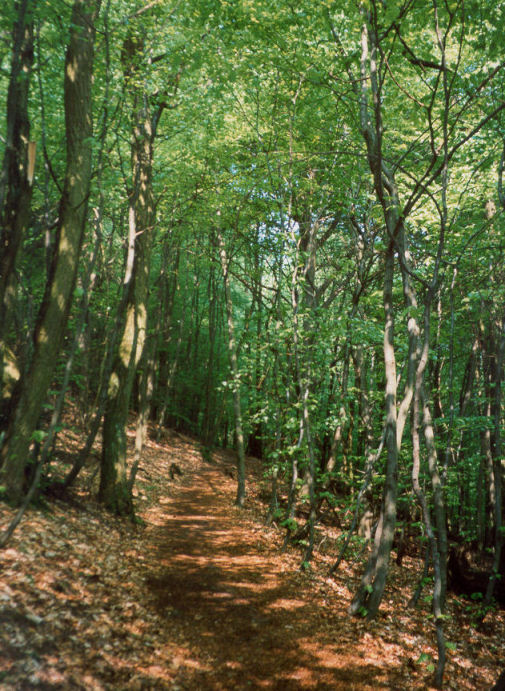
Footpath in the Palatine Forest, Germany

Other references to paths in the Psalter include: Psalm 16: "Thou life's path wilt make me know"

Psalm 119: "and to thy paths will have a good eye"

==== Anthropomorphic nature ====
This Psalm attempts to describe the nature of God. God is described as a man, and thus describes actual man as lesser to preserve man's inferiority to God. When God is made man, man becomes a worm (Psalm 22), a sheep (Psalm 23), or a tree.

Verse 2 describes the righteous as "a freshly planted tree" and continues this metaphor by referring to the "braunches", "fruite" and "leafe" of the tree as ways of describing a prosperous follower of God. This imagery continues through the rest of the Psalter.

Trees may be used in Psalms for several reasons. The roots of a tree may be a metaphor for roots in God. Fruit borne from trees may be a metaphor for the gifts of God. The growth of trees may be a metaphor for spiritual growth. Use of fig leaves to represent shame or sin are also tree-related imagery. Examples from the text include:

Psalm 72:

"I as an Olive tree,
Still green shall flourish:
God's house the soil shall be
My roots to nourish."

Psalm 92:

"Like cedar high
and like date-bearing tree,
For green and growth, the just shall be."

=== Translation differences ===
In this section the word "translation" refers to translation of meaning.

Biblical translations were rife in the 16th century as the growth of the Church of England promoted personal relationships with God and understanding of Holy texts. These various translations highlighted some problems with interpreting "the Word of God": How is meaning truly translated? This is particularly true with literary versions such as the Sidney Psalter, which as aesthetic interpretations may arguably cause the focus on form and courtly style to obscure the true message – or revisers of "The Whole Booke of Psalmes" thought. The examples below highlight some differences in meaning implied by different translations. Sidney's Psalm One is here compared to the anti-aesthetic King James Bible equivalent.

"He shall be like a freshly planted tree
To which sweet springs of waters neighbours be"

"and he shall be like a tree planted by the rivers of water".

The main difference between the verse translations is in the addition of adjectives. For example, the adjective "freshly" arguably changes the imagery of this section, from that of a firmly rooted, strong being of nature to a weak and flexible sapling. Another interpretation of this is that Sidney's tree represents a "fresh" faith that still has room to grow with the aid of God's "sweet springs".

Equally, the inclusion of the noun "neighbours" in the following line gives new action to the "water", making the "waters neighbours" to the tree changes the relationship between the two from one of simple useful proximity to an active relationship of caring attention.

"Wicked" to "ungodly".

In both line 2, verse 1 and line 1, verse 3, Sidney prefers the word "ungodly" as used in the King James Bible for the word "wicked". In the 16th century the difference between these two adjectives were not as great as it appears to a modern audience, but the different level of negative connotation remains. Often in biblical literature the "ungodly" simply need educating and saving, making them appear more as "the lost sheep"; whereas "the wicked" suggests a greater intention to do evil. Part of the definition of "wicked" in the Oxford English Dictionary reads as "inclined or addicted to wilful wrong-doing". So the change in adjective changes the level of sinners' "wilful" intent.

"But are like the chaf which the wind driveth away". "But like chaf with wind/ Scattered".

In this line the main difference is clearly the term "scattered" as opposed to "driveth away". The King James Bible was not completed until 1611, long after the circulation of the Psalter, so it cannot be said that Sidney softened or made harsher any terms as had not the comparative reference we see here. What can be said is that different imagery is created: Sidney's psalm portrays the wicked being separated from one another, carelessly "scattered" away, while the King James Bible gives the impression of force driving away the wicked to a separate and faraway place. "Scattered" also has positive connotations, however, especially in relation to farming. A farmer will "scatter" seeds to grow or "scatter" feed for beasts. Although this is not the implied meaning here, these connotations are significant in view of the frequency with which animal-husbandry and agricultural language appear throughout the Book of Psalms.

"But on God's law his heart's delight doth binde". "But his delight is in the law of the Lord".

There are many interesting differences between these lines. First let us examine the placement of God in the sentence construction. In both sentences "God" or "the Lord" is the object however where the King James Bible uses the now standard sentence construction SVO (subject, verb, object) placing "the Lord" at the end of the sentence. The Sidney psalm has an archaic OSV (object, subject, verb) form. One reason for this could simply be to make the line fit the rhyming pattern ("binde" rhyming with "minde" at the end of the following line). But it changes the importance placed on "God"/"the Lord" by placing him in the middle of the line, where his presence has less impact than it does as the closing words in the King James Bible version.

Another difference is the inclusion of the possessive noun "heart's". As with previous examples, inclusion of extra words like these have often been put down to poetic flourishes, but they do create different interpretations of the text. By making the "delight" from the "heart" Sidney makes the "delight" a purely emotional reaction, whereas, without this addition in The King James Bible translation, the delight can equally be from the mind – happy to choose the righteous option – or soul – naturally reacting to God – or any other part of man.

=== Criticism ===
In his journal "Sir Philip Sidney's Psalms, the Sixteenth-Century Psalter, and the Nature of Lyric", Roland Greene praises Philip Sidney as "the premier English poetical theorist of the time". However, most criticism and reviews of the Sidney Psalter focus on the later psalms written by Mary Sidney, with Moffet terming Mary Sidney's Psalmes "sweet and heavenly tuned,". This sadly leaves a gap in critical response to first 43 Psalms, which were written by Philip Sidney before his death, though there is much on his other works.

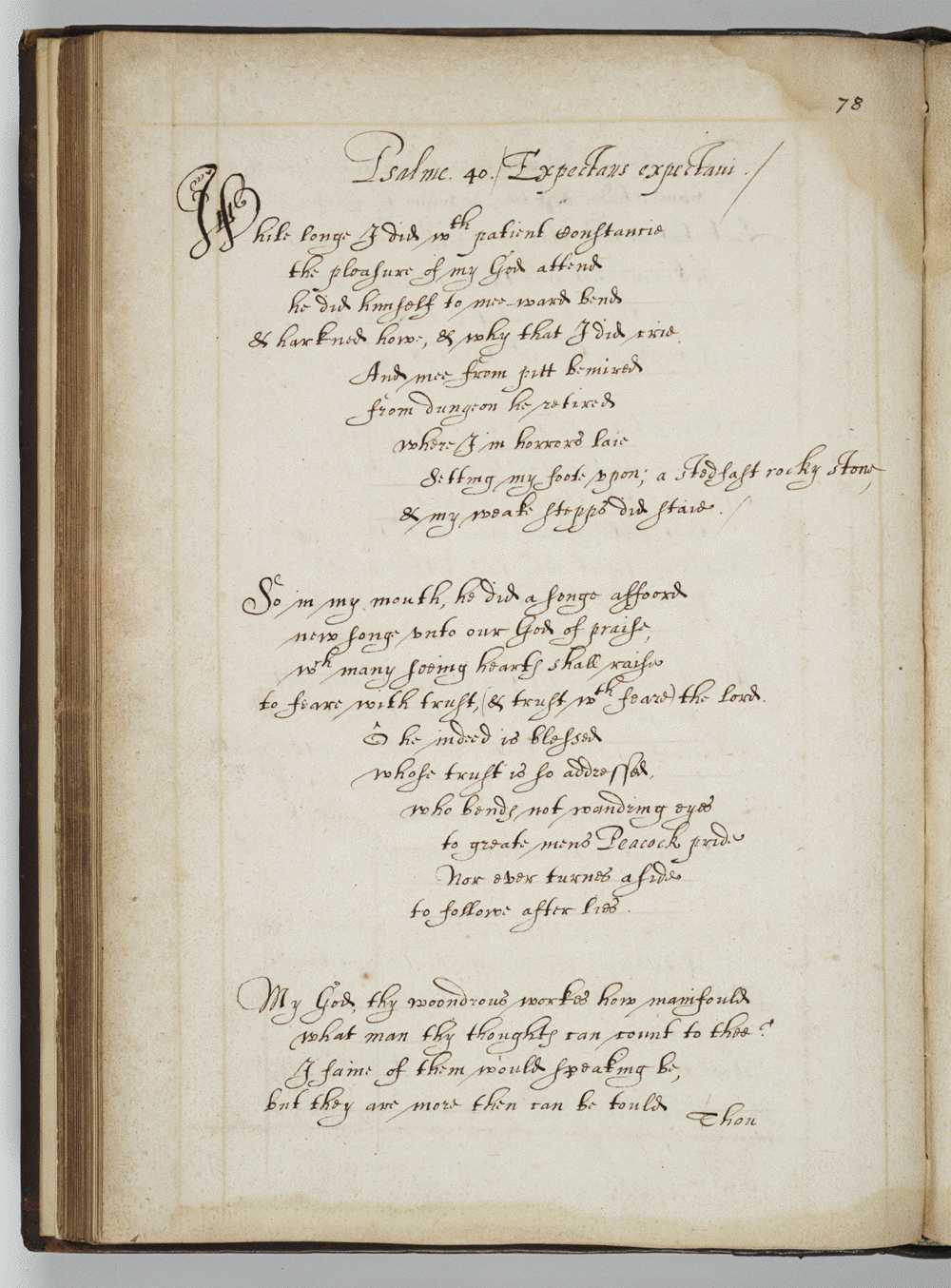
Psalm 40 from the Sidney Psalms

However, there is some criticism of the Psalter as a whole. David Norton explains how Bray, a Sidney contemporary and a "great spreader of Christian culture", hoped that "literary appreciation (of a sort) would make people more religious.". Bray praised the Psalter as a work of art, which would make people more interested in the Bible and thereby religion.

== Psalm 3 ==
This section focuses on the third Psalm featured in the Sidney Psalter, a project that involved translating the Psalms into English poetry in the 16th century. Originally written by poet Sir Philip Sidney, the project was completed by his sister Mary Herbert after Philip's death in 1586. Psalm 3 was written by Philip Sidney and adapts the third biblical Psalm, told from the perspective of David when he fled from his son Absalom. When Philip Sidney died in a military campaign, he had completed only 43 of the Psalms. The remaining translations were left for his sister. A copy was presented to Elizabeth I in 1599. Although The Sidney Psalms were privately circulated, they were not officially published until 1828. While some have criticised them for considerable differences between Sidney's poetic elaborations and the Psalms that feature in the anti-aesthetic King James Bible, others have praised them for their creative poetic forms. Most notably complimentary were the metaphysical poets John Donne and George Herbert.

=== Synopsis ===
Psalm 3 belongs to Sidney's Psalmes of David, as David is the subject of many of the Psalms. It is his personal thanksgiving to God for answering the prayer of an afflicted soul. In the King James Bible, the Psalm is introduced as "A Psalm of David, when he fled from Absalom his son". Absalom led a fierce and powerful rebellion against his father, seeking to take the Kingdom from him. When David is left feeling betrayed by his own son and deserted by his subjects, he turns to God in prayer and confesses his faith. The story of Absalom can be found in the two Books of Samuel. Sidney's Psalm opens with David questioning God about the ever constant presence of sinners in the world. He goes onto say that no matter how his enemies may multiply, he can rely on God to be his protector.

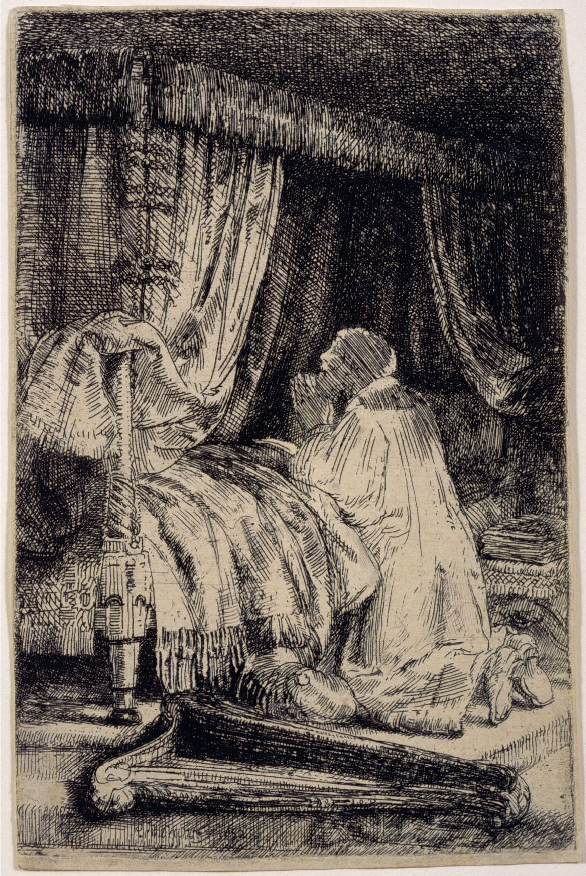
'David in Prayer' by Rembrandt van Rijn

=== Structure ===
As with all Sidney's poetic adaptations, Psalm 3 has a consistent rhyme scheme throughout.It is divided into six stanzas, each opening with a rhyming couplet and having an AABCCB rhyme scheme. The original biblical Psalms make no use of rhyme, which highlights the parallel between aestheticism and anti-aestheticism. However, Sidney's use of rhyme helps to maintain the psalm's traditional musical style.

=== Themes ===
==== Segregation of the sinful ====
A recurring theme in Sidney's Psalms is the divide between the righteous and the sinful, sinners frequently being referred to as "enemies". Psalm 3 opens with David directly questioning God about such enemies:

"LORD, how do they encrease,
That hatefull never cease
To breed my grievous trouble
How many ones there be,
That all against poor me
Their numbrous strength redouble?"

David expresses deep feelings of betrayal in referring to Absalom, his subjects and all those involved in the rebellion. The verb "encrease" accompanied by the connotations of "breed" convey an animal image, suggesting that the traitors are a separate, growing species. Thus the sinful are being dehumanised. In the final line of the stanza, David's enemies' "numbrous strength redoubling" conveys an almost militaristic image. The idea of David's enemies becoming a vast army emphasises his solitude and presents him as a humbling narrator. He thereby evokes sympathy, causing a division between the righteous and the sinful.

=== Differences Between Sidney's and the King James Version Psalm 3 ===
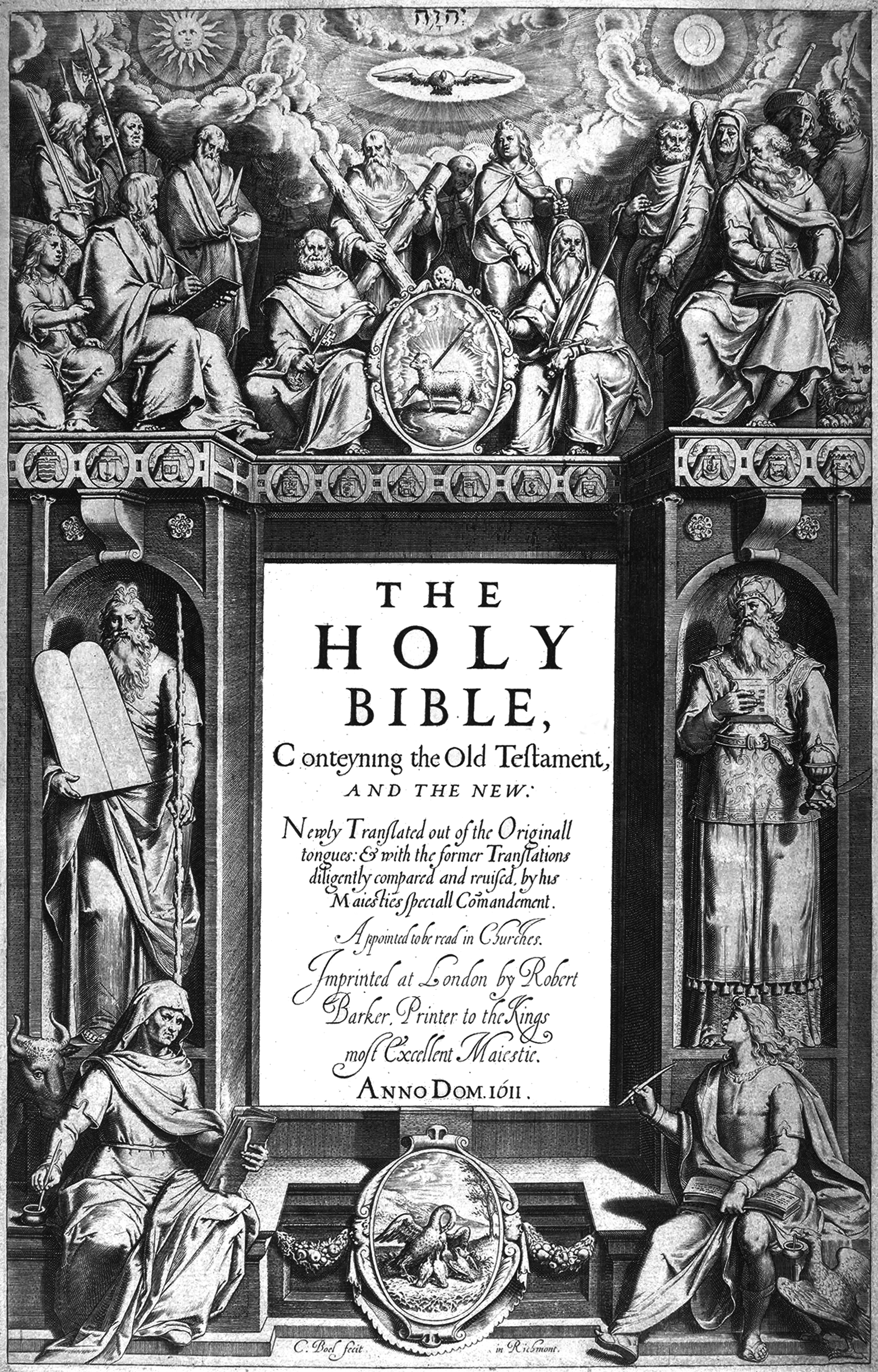
The King James Bible

The King James Version (KJV) does not embrace the same aesthetic values that Sidney's Psalms do. Sidney's are considerably longer than those from the KJV, delving into more literary detail with more frequent use of metaphors, vivid imagery and elaborately poetic language. Psalms are often referred to as sacred songs or hymns, the word Psalm originating from the Greek psallein meaning "to pluck". However, despite Sidney's musical use of rhyme and rhythm, it has been argued that Sidney's Psalms inject a stronger poetic theme rather than a musical one: "Sidney and especially Pembroke put into thorough practice theories of psalmody as poetry that other authors did not, but in doing so separated their work from the mainstream use of complete metrical psalters: public congregational singing." This can be seen in Psalm 3 with the use of the word "selah" in the KJV. Selah is a musical direction used frequently at the end of a Psalm. It appears twice in Psalm 3, but does not feature in Sidney's translation. This exemplifies a lack of the musical element in favour of a poetic one.

==== God as benevolent figure ====
Arguably the strongest difference between Sidney's Psalm 3 and the original text is its representation of God. Here the KJV follows the original more closely, presenting presents God as a smiting, condemning figure more in keeping with the God of the Old Testament. Sidney's Psalms offer a more loving, benevolent God attributed more often to the New Testament, with a clear juxtaposition between early readings of the Bible and the 16th-century interpretations of it. By the time Sidney began the project, the God of the Old Testament was no longer the one that Christians identified with. The figure of Jesus Christ as the son of God and his teachings of tolerance and forgiveness had caused God to evolve from an icon of aggressive punishment to a far more fatherly figure. In Sidney's Psalm 3, David addresses God as his father: "Help me, my God and Father!" whereas God is never addressed this way in the KJV. In the latter, instead of pleading God to "help" him, David asks God to "save" him. This perhaps implies that David fears the wrath of God and feels as though his soul requires saving, whereas Sidney's use of the word "help" presents a softer image and a more supportive and loving bond with God. In the KJV, David thanks God for smiting his enemies. The use of violent imagery highlights the complete contrast between the two very different representations of the Christian God.

=== Translation differences and the impact of phraseology ===
There are vast differences in translation between the Sidney Psalter and the KJV, to the extent that each line in Sidney's Psalms differs almost entirely. Sidney tends to take one image from the original Psalm and elaborate on it to an extent that one line from the KJV can be conveyed in an entire stanza. This reflects the differences of purpose behind the two translations. Whilst the KJV is meant as a literal English translation of the word of God, Sidney had more poetic and artistic intentions. His version is not merely translating the Bible into English, but into a work of art. Even slight differences in phraseology can convey an entirely new meaning. Sidney translates the phrase "O LORD, [art] a shield for me" into "Yet, Lord, Thou art my shield." The use of "thou" directly addresses God in prayer and thus creates a more personal bond between David and God. Furthermore, Sidney refers to God as "my shield", as opposed to "a shield", so strengthening the personal connection and suggesting that God is the sole protector David requires, whereas the KJV implies that he could be just one of many shields David has in his life.

=== Responses and influences ===
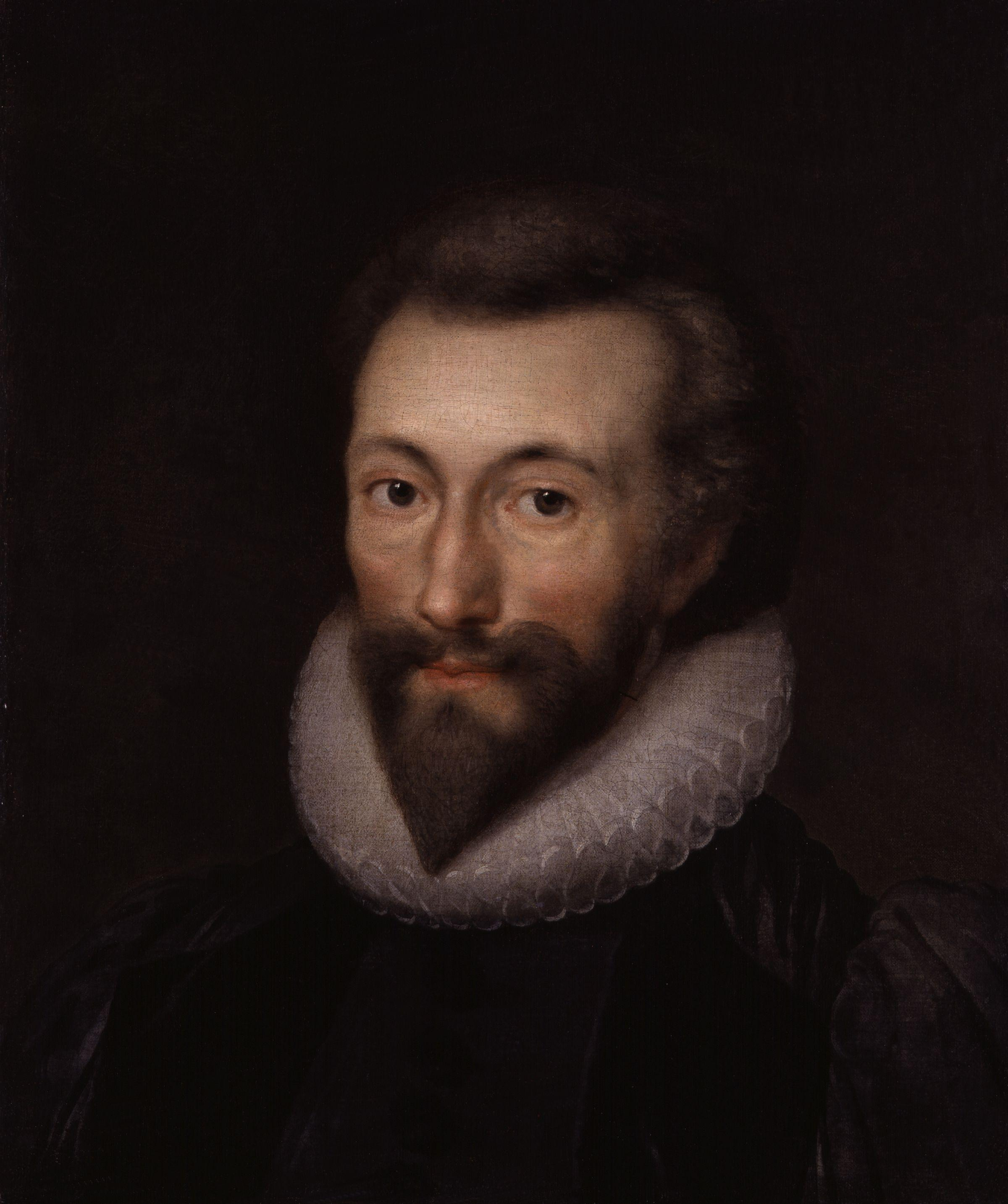
John Donne

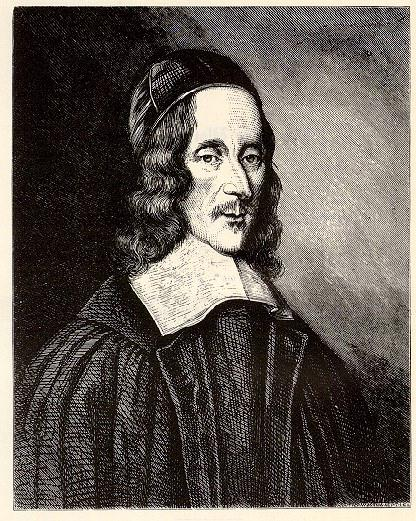
George Herbert, Portrait by Robert White in 1674. From National Portrait Gallery

The metaphysical poet John Donne wrote to celebrate the Sidney Psalter, "Divine Poems Upon the Translation of the Psalms by Sir Philip Sidney and the Countess of Pembroke, His Sister", claiming that he could "scarce" call the English Church reformed until its psalter had been modelled after the poetic transcriptions of the Philip Sidney and Mary Herbert. The Sidney Psalter also had an influence on the later religious poetry of George Herbert. There are distinct similarities between the Psalter and his poem "The Temple".

== Psalm 23 ==
=== Themes ===
The main theme of Psalm 23 is to represent God as a Shepherd there to guide mankind as a shepherd guides his sheep. Sidney also mentions being led up a "righteous path"[1]. This creates a theme of faith and dutiful worship to God, almost as a show of gratitude for keeping his "sheep" safe.

=== Context ===
Sidney's Psalm 23 arises out of a psalm originally written by King David. According to Tom Wacaster, "While most commentators believe that it was written in David's youth, while he was tending sheep for his father, it might just as well have been written at a later age, when he had experienced the hardships in life and God's guidance through troubled times." This would further explain the allegorical imagery of God as the Shepherd, with David comparing his worship to that of a Sheep following the Shepherd. Sidney's version seems more intent on adding a sense of poetic styling more adept to the 16th-century Englishman. Roland Greene states that "the Psalters deserve a central location in our understanding of what sixteenth-century poets did – for they certainly wrote a prodigious volume of psalmic translations – and of what they thought about what they did." He goes on to argue "that a striking development in sixteenth-century English lyric poetry is the sustained effort by often dissimilar poets to explore the boundaries between what we might call the ritual and the fictional dimensions of lyric. By the ritual element, I mean the poem's office as directions for a performance: a script compounded of sounds that serve referential or expressive purposes in non-poetic". This could support the idea of Sidney's Psalter creating a more aesthetic approach in a context for rewriting them in more beautiful wording that is found in the original Hebrew.

=== Analysis ===
Psalm 23 applies an unconventional rhyme scheme. While the first stanza does not follow the next in rhythmic pattern, the second, third and fourth present an "ABBACC" rhyme scheme similar to an English sestet. Sidney seems to have aimed at a lyricism not found in the original translations such as the King James Version. However, it adds a sense of poetic lyricism to David's original. He makes merely subtle changes in the overall meaning behind the original translation. Many of the references, such as "green pastures" and "thy rod and thy staff" remain unchanged, but Sidney's portrayal of God is much kinder and gentler than David's. This can be seen in Sidney's specific alterations. Instead of God "maketh me to lie down in green pastures" comes "He rests me in green pastures". This creates an image of God more benevolent and calming, rather than more forceful and commanding.

Another reason for Sidney to change the meaning of Psalms is said to be to bridge understanding of their message to all, as stated in Sir Philip Sidney's Defense of Prophesying: "The Psalms had always been integral to Christian worship, but sixteenth-century Protestants placed special emphasis on them. The trials, tribulations, and joys of the Psalmist resonated deeply with the Protestant experience; the ease with which the Psalms could be set to new tunes and memorized made them a perfect vehicle for turning the Protestant message into a mass movement capable of embracing the illiterate alongside the literate." By this it seems that Sidney was attempting a more accessible version of the Psalms, removing the perception that biblical teachings must be handled by holy men such as priests or monks, and creating a unified understanding of The Bible that could be interpreted as seen by each individual.

Another example of God being a less aggressive figure in the Sidney Psalms is the way the narrative voice refers to being taken towards water. In David's original Psalm 23 God "leadeth me beside the still waters," but in Sidney's version, "by waters still, and sweet he guides my feet." This creates the idea of a God less authoritative and more assistive in letting man find their path towards heaven.

In From Testament to Covenant, Kenneth Hagen suggests, "Since Christ is the author of the New Testament, he antiquates the whole old law, including the moral law. Those who do not believe in Christ are still subject to the law, but those in Christ are free. The reason for this freedom is that Christ forgives sin and confers the Holy Spirit on Christians, who moves them to right acts. Christians do not need the law to prompt them to right deeds. They do what the law asks under the Spirit's guidance".

This suggests that by the 16th century, the Old Testament portrayal of God was becoming redundant and a more fatherly perception found in the New Testament became the reference for most Christians in England. So Sidney's portrayal of God in his Psalms would be less aggressive and commanding than the version seen in David's Psalm 23.

A similarity between both versions of Psalm 23 is the presence of Death and how it is portrayed. David describes walking through "the valley of the shadow of death" and claims to fear no evil, stating, "For thou art with me, thy rod and thy staff they comfort me." As stated by Derwin L. Grey, "King David was experiencing a time of 'doom and gloom'; he felt as though death was near. Hardship, peril, chaos, and deep suffering were invading his life. In our fallen world, these things will invade our lives, too. At some point, you and I, too, will make that long, slow, painful walk through the 'valley of the shadow of death'." However, this suggests that David has faith in his connection to God and knows that God's lead will keep him from being harmed or committing sin, keeping once again with the Shepherd theme of a pure innocent lamb being kept safe, as referenced by the image of the "staff" and "rod".

Sidney alters this: instead of a "shadow of death" he refers to "death's dark shade". This is more in line with later perceptions of evil or "Satan" taking a more physical form. In this case, Death being a looming figure attempting to sway the narrative voice from the path of Christianity, and as stated by Sidney, "Yea, though I should through valley stray, Of death's dark shade, I will No whit fear ill." It is once more suggestive that Sidney is portraying God as a more understanding being in his translation of Psalm 23. While David says he knows he will not stray because of the Lord, Sidney states that even though he may be led astray, he knows that the lord will lead him back on the right path, creating an image of a more forgiving God not found within the Old Testament.

Another key alteration that Sir Philip Sidney makes is changing "the enemy", as mentioned in David's version of Psalm 23. David evokes a sense of the enemy as more than just on the battlefield, but also those who are unfaithful, sin itself and anyone who opposes Christianity, whereas Sidney changes this to the "foe", and stating " Ev'n when foe's envious eye Doth it espy." This seems influenced by Sidney's time as a member of Queen Elizabeth's Court, until "In 1580, he incurred the Queen Elizabeth's displeasure by opposing her projected marriage to the Duke of Anjou, Roman Catholic heir to the French throne, and was dismissed from court for a time.". However he later returned, when "Elizabeth instead summoned Sidney to court, and appointed him governor of Flushing in the Netherlands." It would therefore seem that Sidney's use of the term "espy" refers to his distrust of the Catholics and the French, while his version of Psalm 23 has more of a political agenda, not one of just faith to Christianity, but to Queen Elizabeth and her court as well.

Another example of Sidney modernising Psalm 23 to reflect the Elizabethan court is his description of Heaven as a "hall", as opposed to a "house" as stated by David. David creates the sense of an eternal dwelling and a more homely place to eternally rest, whereas Sidney creates an image of God running a high court, reflecting the one that he served in before his death, in the service of Queen Elizabeth.

== Psalm 43 ==
Psalm 43 in The Sidney Psalter is one written by brother and sister, Mary and Philip Sidney. The Sidney Psalter was written by both siblings because Philip had begun the work on writing it, but died before he could finish it. This lead Mary Sidney to finish the work for him. The Psalm was written in the 16th Century by Philip Sidney, and was the last work he wrote before he died. The Sidney Psalter is a poetic adaption of the Biblical Psalms and differs much from other reworkings of the Psalms throughout the Renaissance period. Psalm 43 focuses on God as a protector alongside his absence and presence throughout. The Sidney Psalms are seen as "The most extreme example in this century of the wish to foster through translation an appreciation of the Psalms as poetry is the version begun by Sir Philip Sidney..."

=== Themes ===
The themes that occur in Sidney's Psalm 43 are these:

==== God as a protector ====
Immediately in the first two lines of Psalm 43 comes the speaker's plea to God to be his protector. These two lines, "Judge of all, judge me And protector be" (Sidney, 2009, p. 83) set up the rest of the first stanza in terms of pleading to God to protect the speaker. This is seen when the speaker pleads to God to "Save me from bad wights, In false colours dressèd." (Sidney, 2009, p. 83). The last line, "In false colours dressèd" (Sidney, 2009, p. 83) refers to heraldic insignia, people that are part of the coat of arms and that wear the insignia. The speaker's plea here is for God to protect the speaker in ways that the heraldic insignia cannot, as well as those that represent it, as he earlier refers to "bad wights" (bad people, Sidney, 2009, p. 83) and claims they dress in "false colours" (Sidney, 2009, p. 83). A possibility here could be that those that represent the heraldic insignia are corrupt, perhaps even unmerciful. This can be due to representing such a high order in society that has an aim to protect people, yet the power that comes with it can cause corruption in the person. So the speaker labels them as "bad wights"(Sidney, 2009, p. 83), which means they cannot be protected by them, for if they do let them, they too would become like them and lose their connection with God.

The second stanza continues with the theme as God as a protector. The speaker goes on to ask God, "Why then hast thou left me?"(Sidney, 2009, p. 83). This shows the absence of God and emphasizes the speaker's suffering on Earth with his "prevailing foes" whilst he walks "in woes" (Sidney, 2009, p. 83). God's absence at this point in the Psalm is important here as it shows how desperate the speaker is to reconnect with God. The beginning of the third stanza further emphasises God's absence and the speaker's desperation to connect with Him, which leads on to the next theme.

==== Desperation to reconnect with God ====
Stanza three shows the speaker becoming desperate to reconnect with God, continuously pleading to God until the end of the psalm. It begins with "Send thy truth and light, Let them guide me right". This shows that the speaker is asking God to guide him again through the use of "truth and light". The light represents something pure and innocent and in this case may be a glimpse of light from Heaven. The speaker appears to have lost his way somehow and asks God to send him things to guide him again, to what he labels as "thy hill most holy". He goes on further, in his desperate plea, by saying, "To God's altars tho Will I boldly go" in stanza four. Here, the speaker is shown to claim that he would do anything for God in order to be reconnected with him. This leads into stanza five where he says, "Then, lo, then I will With sweet music's skill Grateful meaning show thee: Then, God, yea, my God, I will sing abroad What great thanks I owe thee.". The speaker here is saying that he will sing to everyone of God's glory and of how he owes thanks to God. The desperation to reconnect with God is continuous throughout the stanza, especially when he refers to God as "my God". Referring to God as his God establishes that he has complete faith in God. Further on in the stanza, when it says "I will sing abroad what great thanks I owe thee" the speaker informs that he would sing loudly to those around him about God's greatness and how he is thankful for all God does for him.

The final stanza can be seen as the speaker making his re-connection with God as He is presented as being present in this stanza. An example that shows this is when it says at the end of the psalm, "Thank my God, I will, Sure aid, present comfort.". The use of the word "present" alone provides us with the idea that God is now present, which means the speaker has been successful in reconnecting with God. The line, "Sure aid, present comfort" can be seen to mean that God is "Sure aid, present comfort" making this a reason as to why God should be worshiped by others. This is because, according to the speaker, he provides aid and comfort for people when "thy soul" is "Cast down in such dole". The speaker ensures, however, that as long as the people "Wait on God" and thank Him for His "Sure aid" and "present comfort" they will have some form of connection with God. In this psalm the speaker goes on a journey to reconnect with God and as it ends, the connection is re-established. This suggests that a person has to be patient with God as well as have faith in him to obtain this connection with Him.

=== Translation differences and criticism ===
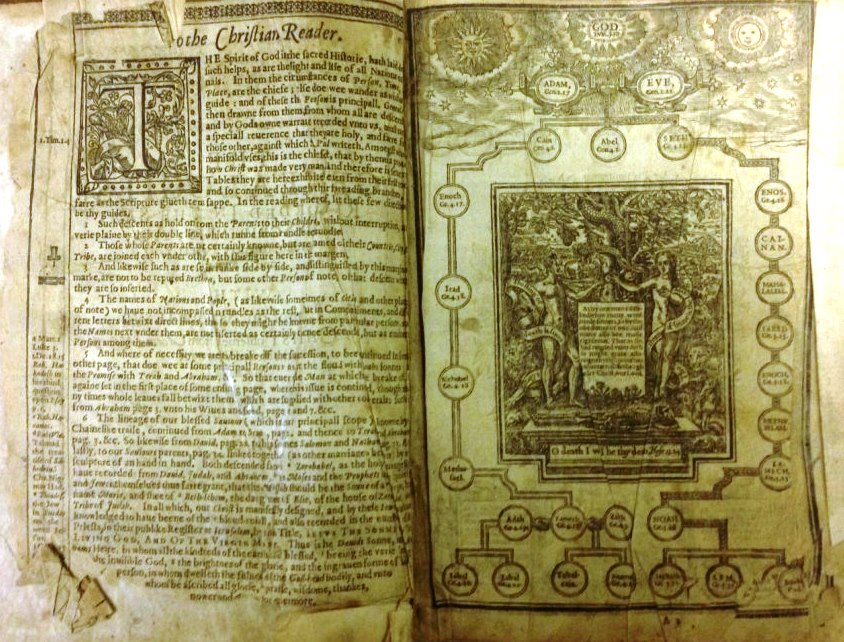
John Speed's Genealogies recorded in the Sacred Scriptures (1611), bound into first King James Bible in quarto size (1612)

There are many translation differences between the Sidney Psalter and the King James Bible. This caused issues in the 16th century as the translations show different interpretations of what is the word of God. The King James Bible version of Psalm 43 is significantly shorter than Psalter's. This in itself can be problematic, as the KJB Psalm 43 is all of four lines long, whereas Psalter's is a lengthy six stanzas. This immediately would have caused controversy, especially when the Sidney Psalter is deemed to be more poetic than the KJB, while the Sternhold and Hopkins translations are less poetic than the KJB and the Sidney Psalter. The differences in the length of the psalm has been noted by critics, one being Norton, who says that due to the type of differences in the Sidney Psalter, it makes it "unsurprising that the Sidney Psalter should have remained unpublished.... The Sidney Psalter could not appeal to the religious populace.". Again, this can be down to the translations of the Bible and its contents. As translations have been done, the question is whether the text really translates God's word from its original Hebrew. This tends to be why the Sidney Psalter is viewed more so as a literary work than an accurate translation.

== Psalm 137 ==
Psalm 137, Super Flumina, was written by Mary Sidney, Countess of Pembroke. Super Flumina is taken from the Latin translation of the original Psalm 137, Super Flumina Babylonis. The choice of excluding "Babylonis" from the title foreshadows other major differences Sidney made in her translation of the psalm. It uses a modified ottava rima rhyming scheme, and is in general a woeful tale of exile and revenge.

=== Themes ===
==== Violent and dark imagery ====
A significant amount of violent and dark imagery can be found in Psalm 137. The fourth and fifth stanzas focus almost entirely on revenge and suffering, examples of this being in lines 27–30 and lines 39–40.

"Who causelessly, yet hotly set
Thy holy city to deface,
Did thus the bloody victors whet
What time they ent'red first the place" (lines 27-30)

The use of "deface" and "hotly" implies anger from the speakers, which is understandable given their situation. However, this escalates to violence with "bloody victors", and suggests them acting on their anger and thoughts and retaliating against their captors. It could also be that the 'victors' are bloody due to the injuries, both emotionally and physically, they have caused to the speakers by taking them from their homes by force, and therefore the blood from the speakers is on their hands. Whichever conclusion is taken from this line, it is clear that violence has happened in some form.

"Yea happy, who thy little ones
Shall take and dash against the stones." (lines 39–40)

These lines are definitely darker than the previous quote, as it is literally saying that the speakers will be happy to see their captors punished by having their children thrown/dashed against stones. In fact, they are asking God to help them in punishing their captors, so it is also highlighting God's ability to punish people so easily if He should want to. It could even be said that they are taking advantage of God's power and even taking it too far in their anger, as they are too weak to rise up and take their revenge for themselves. The rhyming couplet of "ones" and "stones" on the final two lines of the stanza and the entire psalm makes them memorable. It is interesting how Mary Sidney wanted to emphasise such a violent and dark image as the last lines of the psalm. The lines and reference to dashing children against stones are in the church approved King James Version of Psalm 137, but the couplet emphasises this a lot more. There are a lot of double meanings in the psalm and potential dark undertones that Sidney uses, like in the first stanza where "we hardly expect the tears of the exiles to be figured as bounty nourishing the land of Babylon, but perhaps this is to be read bitterly as a form of exploitation.", as noted by Hamlin.

==== Grief ====
Grief can be found in the rest of the psalm, as it is about the speakers' mourning of the loss of their home. Specifically, the "tears of the exiles" refers to lines 3–5 of Psalm 137.

"Which then our tears in pearléd rows
Did help to water with their rain:
The thought of Sion bred such woes," (lines 3-5)

This implies that they unwillingly "help" their captors by watering their land. Also, the "pearlèd rows", while being a metaphor for their tears, also refers to the pearl necklaces that courtiers such as Mary Sidney would have worn in court, and to Sidney's life and social class. She was privileged enough to circulate her psalms at the courts and have them sung and praised by other prestigious members of the courts, like John Donne and George Herbert. So "her choices in wording reflect her own social class and personal experience – as a woman, as a courtier, and as a poet.", as Hannay summarises in her work.

==== Asking God for revenge ====
Revenge is a constant theme in Psalm 137, Super Flumina, as mentioned already. However, the lines refer to the speakers asking God for revenge as they feel they cannot do it by themselves and know how powerful God is.

"Down down with it at any hand,
Make all flat plane, let nothing stand.
And Babylon, that didst us waste,
Thy self shalt one day wasted be:" (lines 31-34)

The phrase "let nothing stand" shows how angry they are, to the point where they ask God to destroy this city completely to punish the captors. The repetition of "down" could also be to emphasise how desperate and angry the speakers are, but it could also have been intended to fit into the chosen form Mary Sidney uses of eight syllables for each line. This form is adapted from the popular poetry of the time, which tells of lovers proclaiming their love for one another. It is interesting to see it adapted to the psalms, especially as the church was against this type of poetry and kept its psalms very traditional and close to the originals. Fisken says, "What Mary Sidney emphasised were the parallel functions served by the sonnet cycle and the psalms, the resemblances between the anxiety of the lover beseeching his beloved and the anguish of the worshipper pleading with God.", which implies that the speakers in the psalm are (or Mary Sidney herself, is) likening God to the typical lover seen in sonnets, praising Him and pleading for help to deal with such a situation.

This is also the only time Mary Sidney uses the word "Babylon" in the psalm. As mentioned earlier, she excludes "Babylonis" from the title of the psalm and uses "Babel" in the second line of the psalm. Hamlin notes that this could just be Sidney fitting the words to her chosen form, saying "The use of 'Babel' rather than 'Babylon' in several translations of Psalm 137 may echo the early 'history' of the city in Genesis II, though the disyllabic name may sometimes also just be metrical convenience.". This also mentions that Sidney could just be using another name for the city, but it cannot be ignored that the use of "Babylon" is at a time when the speakers directly ask God for help in destroying this city. So they could be using the proper name because it is a "formal" setting and they are addressing God Himself.

==== Psalm 137 as song ====
Psalm 137 is a song, originally written to be sung, and Mary Sidney's translation definitely resonates with that. The choice of rhyme and a chosen 8-syllable form underlines that songs tend to rhyme, and brings the next line round faster than if Sidney had stuck to the 11-syllable form typically used in the ottava rima scheme, makes it sound more song-like.

"O no, we have no voice, nor hand
For such a song, in such a land." (lines 15-16)

These lines are ironic, in that the speakers are talking about their reluctance and lack of enthusiasm to sing for their captors, as they feel it is degrading to entertain them. So these lines are part of the song themselves, and as the last lines in the stanza they follow the form of the psalm by rhyming and sounding yet more song-like. However, despite the original psalm being a song, it lacks the rhyme and form of Sidney's translation and the Church stuck to the original as closely as possible. The psalms are still sung as song, but there is disagreement with Sidney's decision to elaborate on the song and make it rhyme and sound more song-like, as they do not want to change them. Norton notes that "complete in sense and form, unadapted to the traditional tunes and unaccompanied by music, the Sidney Psalter could appeal to the religious populace.", which shows that what prevented Sidney's psalms from being accepted by the Church was her adaptation of the psalm to traditional poetry and her additional song-like quality.

=== Structure ===
Another difference from the ottava rima form Sidney uses is to have a tetrameter rather than a pentameter. This, like using eight syllables rather than eleven, brings each line round faster, again making it more song-like. Each eight-line stanza follows an ABABABCC rhyme, manipulating the scheme to fit her song-like psalm, with the first six lines in an alternating rhyme sounding more like a poem and the last two lines in a couplet sounding more like a song. These couplets also stress the message for each stanza, like the last two draw attention to the violent, dark image of dashing the children against the stones, showing the overall message of the psalm and leaving the reader with a lasting image.

=== Translation differences from KJV ===
"We hanged our harps upon the willows in the midst thereof" (Psalms 137:2)

"That though our harps we did retain,
Yet useless, and untouched there
On willows only hang'd they were." (lines 6-8)

Mary Sidney's psalms look much different from the church's King James Version even at first glance. They are a lot longer (as are the lines from Sidney's Psalm 137 compared to the KJV verse from Psalm 137 they relate to) and add description. Sidney adds that the harps are "useless, and untouched" rather than just harps. This shows that the speakers find no use for their once beloved harps as soon as they have been taken from their home, as they are refusing to play for and entertain their captors. And this is only one example of the difference in both texts, because, as Hannay says, "many of [Sidney's] Psalm paraphrases depart so radically in form and style from the biblical originals".

Overall, these were Sidney and her courtier friends' interpretations and translations of the psalms, and in the words of Norton, "the admiration of such writers helped to foster such a much more ambitious artistic approach to the Psalms in the seventeenth century."
