= Philip Sidney =

English poet, courtier, and diplomat (1554–1586)

Sir Philip Sidney
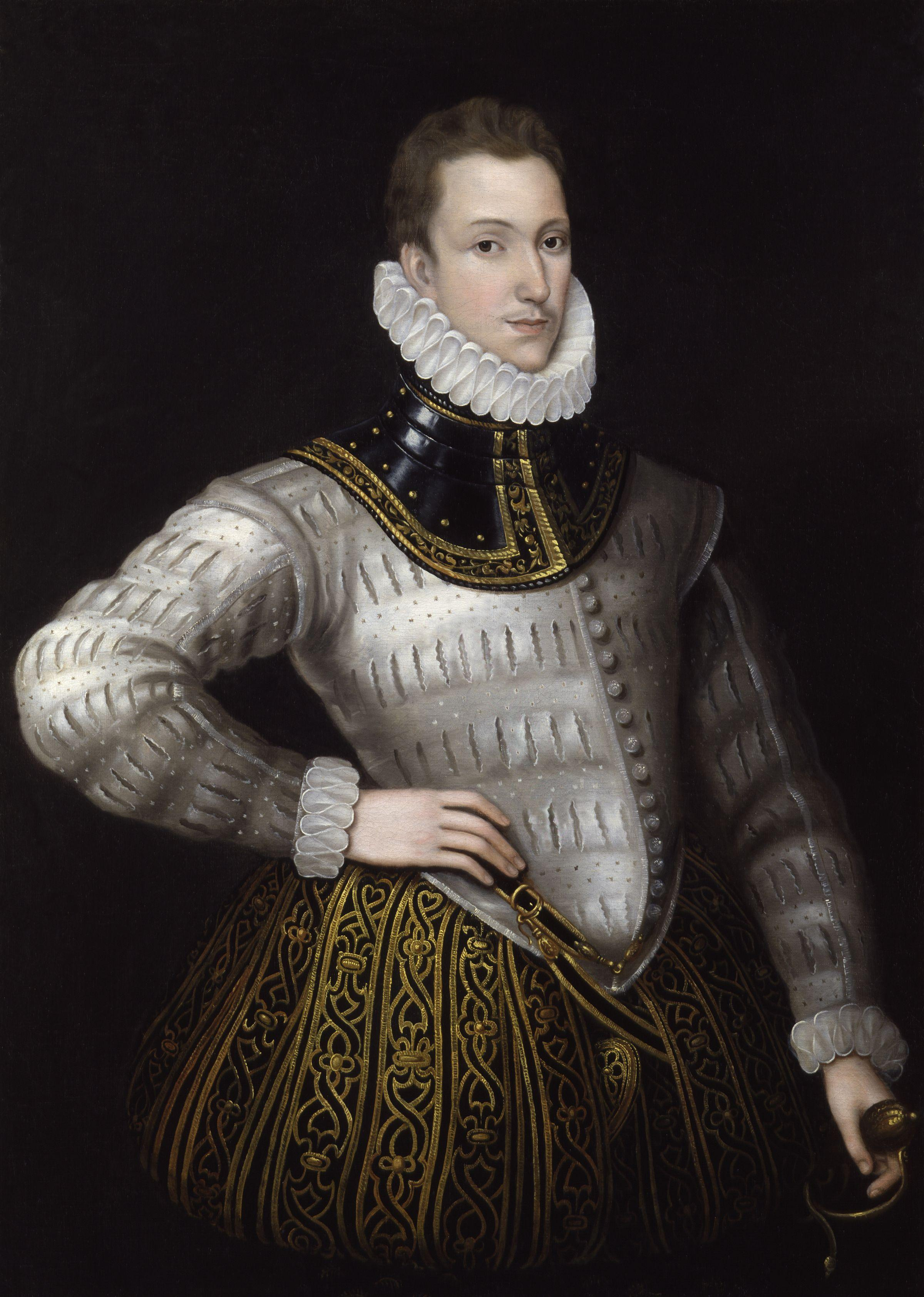
- Sir Philip Sidney, after Antonis Mor
- Born: 30 November 1554; Penshurst Place, Kent, England
- Died: 17 October 1586 (aged 31); Arnhem, Netherlands
- Buried: Old St Paul's Cathedral, London
- Noble family: Sidney
- Spouse: Frances Burke, Countess of Clanricarde
- Father: Sir Henry Sidney
- Mother: Lady Mary Dudley
- Writing career
- Language: Early Modern English
- Period: Elizabethan era
- Genres: Sonnet; pastoral romance; treatise
- Notable work: The Countess of Pembroke's Arcadia
- Movements: English Renaissance; Petrarchism

Sir Philip Sidney (30 November 1554 – 17 October 1586) was an English poet, courtier, scholar and soldier who is remembered as one of the most prominent figures of the Elizabethan age.

His works include a sonnet sequence, Astrophil and Stella, a treatise, The Defence of Poesy (also known as The Defence of Poesie or An Apology for Poetrie) and a pastoral romance, The Countess of Pembroke's Arcadia. He died fighting the Spanish in the Netherlands, aged 31, and his funeral procession in London was one of the most lavish ever seen.

== Biography ==
=== Early life ===
Born at Penshurst Place, Kent, of an aristocratic family, he was the eldest son of Sir Henry Sidney and Lady Mary Dudley. His mother was the eldest daughter of John Dudley, 1st Duke of Northumberland, and the sister of Robert Dudley, 1st Earl of Leicester. His sister, Mary, was a writer, translator and literary patron, and married Henry Herbert, 2nd Earl of Pembroke. Sidney dedicated his longest work, the Arcadia, to her. After her brother's death, Mary reworked the Arcadia, which became known as The Countess of Pembroke's Arcadia. His brother Robert Sidney was a statesman and patron of the arts, and was created Earl of Leicester in 1618.

Philip was educated at Shrewsbury School and Christ Church, Oxford.

=== Politics and marriage ===
In 1572, at the age of 18, he travelled to France as part of the embassy to negotiate a marriage between Elizabeth I and the Duc D'Alençon. He spent the next several years in mainland Europe, moving through Germany, Italy, Poland, the Kingdom of Hungary and Austria. On these travels, he met a number of prominent European intellectuals and politicians.

Returning to England in 1575, Sidney met Penelope Devereux (who would later marry Robert Rich, 1st Earl of Warwick). Although much younger, she inspired his famous sonnet sequence of the 1580s, Astrophel and Stella. Her father, Walter Devereux, 1st Earl of Essex, was said to have planned to marry his daughter to Sidney, but Walter died in 1576 and this did not occur. In England, Sidney occupied himself with politics and art. He defended his father's administration of Ireland in a lengthy document.

More seriously, he quarrelled with Edward de Vere, 17th Earl of Oxford, probably because of Sidney's opposition to the French marriage of Elizabeth to the much younger Alençon, which de Vere championed. In the aftermath of this episode, Sidney challenged de Vere to a duel, which Elizabeth forbade. He then wrote a lengthy letter to the Queen detailing the foolishness of the French marriage. Characteristically, Elizabeth bristled at his presumption, and Sidney prudently retired from court.

During a 1577 diplomatic visit to Prague, Sidney secretly visited the exiled Jesuit priest Edmund Campion.

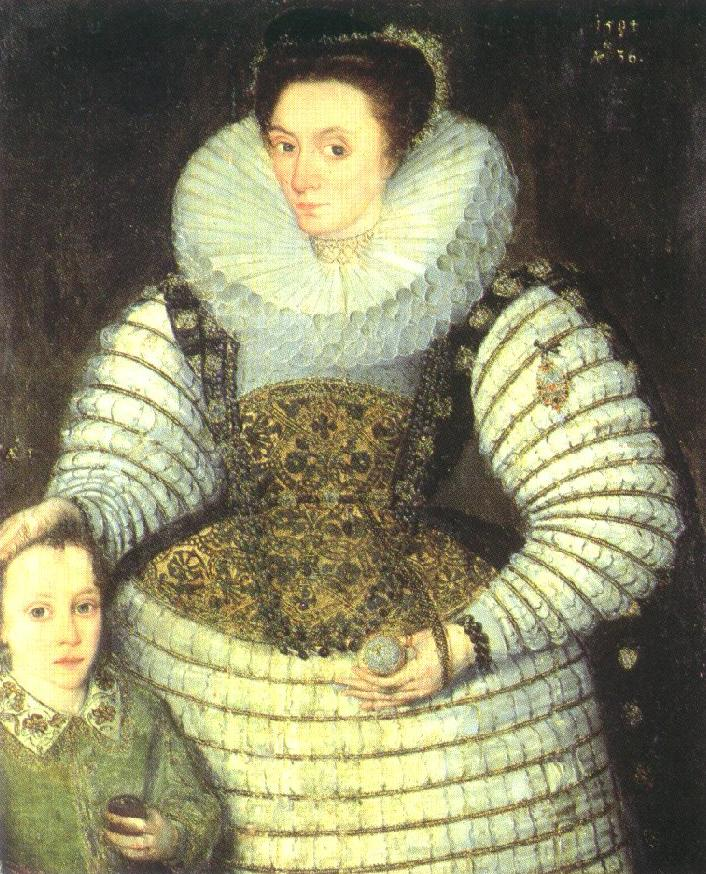
Frances Walsingham, attributed to Robert Peake, 1594

Sidney had returned to court by the middle of 1581. In the latter year he was elected to fill vacant seats in the Parliament of England for both Ludlow and Shrewsbury, choosing to sit for the latter, and in 1584 was MP for Kent. That same year Penelope Devereux was married, apparently against her will, to Lord Rich. Sidney was knighted in 1583. An early arrangement to marry Anne Cecil, daughter of Sir William Cecil and eventual wife of de Vere, had fallen through in 1571. In 1583, he married Frances, the 16-year-old daughter of Sir Francis Walsingham. In the same year, he made a visit to Oxford University with Giordano Bruno, the polymath known for his cosmological theories, who subsequently dedicated two books to Sidney.

In 1585 the couple had one daughter, Elizabeth, who later married Roger Manners, 5th Earl of Rutland, in March 1599 and died without offspring in 1612.

=== Literary writings ===
Like the best of the Elizabethans, Sidney was successful in more than one branch of literature, but none of his work was published during his lifetime. However, it circulated in manuscript. His finest achievement was a sequence of 108 love sonnets. These owe much to Petrarch and Pierre de Ronsard in tone and style, and place Sidney as the greatest Elizabethan sonneteer after William Shakespeare. Written to his mistress, Lady Penelope Rich, though dedicated to his wife, they reveal true lyric emotion couched in a language delicately archaic. In form Sidney usually adopts the Petrarchan octave (ABBAABBA), with variations in the sestet that include the English final couplet. His artistic contacts were more peaceful and significant for his lasting fame. During his absence from court, he wrote Astrophel and Stella (1591) and the first draft of The Arcadia and The Defence of Poesy. Somewhat earlier, he had met Edmund Spenser, who dedicated The Shepheardes Calender to him. Other literary contacts included membership, along with his friends and fellow poets Fulke Greville, Edward Dyer, Edmund Spenser and Gabriel Harvey, of the (possibly fictitious) "Areopagus", a humanist endeavour to classicise English verse.

=== Military activity ===
Sidney played a brilliant part in the military/literary/courtly life common to the young nobles of the time. Both his family heritage and his personal experience (he was in Walsingham's house in Paris during the Saint Bartholomew's Day Massacre), confirmed him as a keenly militant Protestant.

In the 1570s, he persuaded John Casimir to consider proposals for a united Protestant effort against the Catholic Church and Spain. In the winter of 1575-76 he fought in Ireland while his father was Lord Deputy there. In the early 1580s, he argued fruitlessly for an assault on Spain itself. Promoted General of Horse in 1583, his enthusiasm for the Protestant struggle was given free rein when he was appointed governor of Flushing in the Netherlands in 1585. Whilst in the Netherlands, he consistently urged boldness on his superior, his uncle the Earl of Leicester. He carried out a successful raid on Spanish forces near Axel in July 1586.

=== Injury and death ===
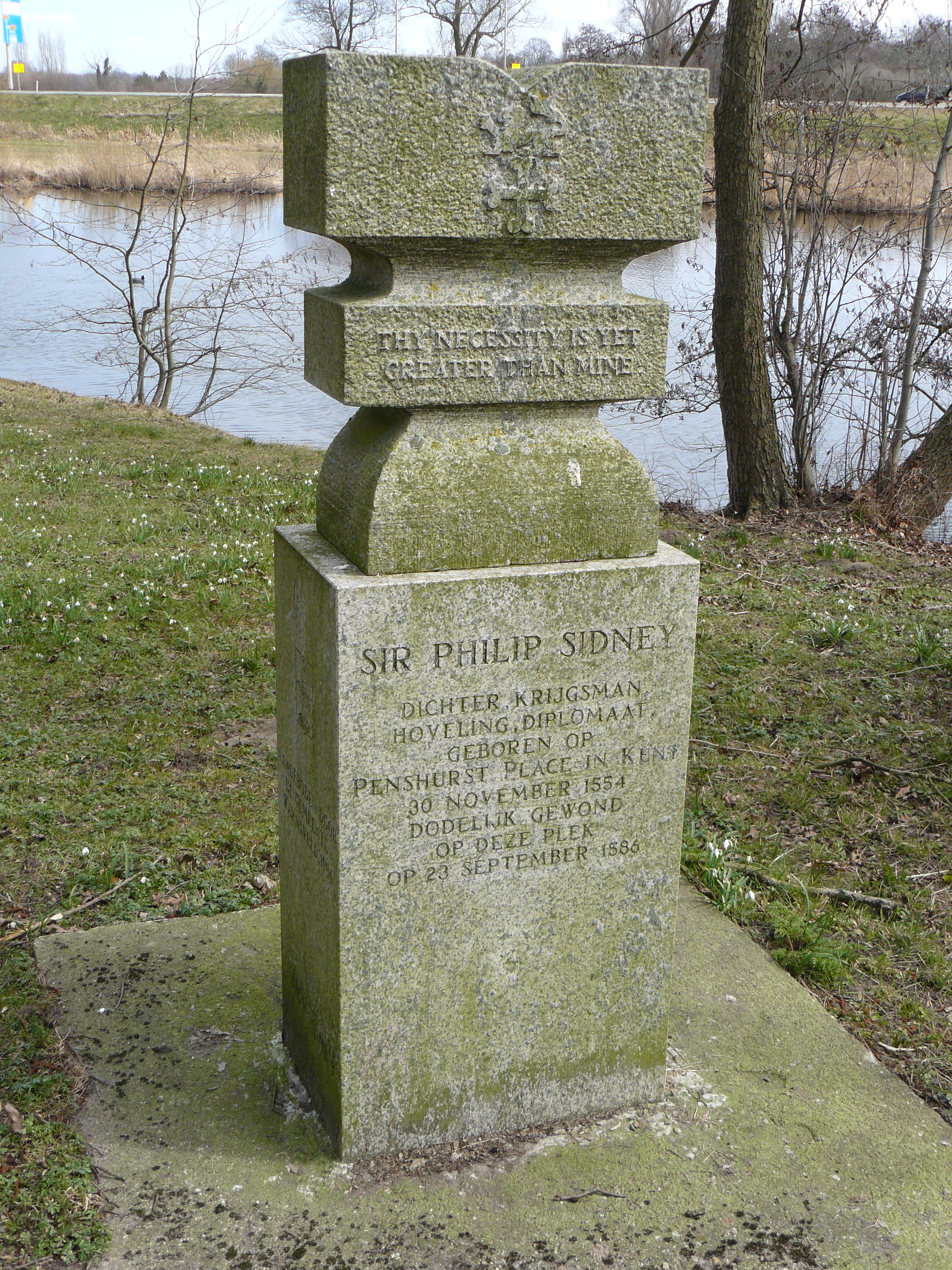
Memorial for Sir Philip Sidney at the spot where he was fatally injured

Later that year, he joined Sir John Norris in the Battle of Zutphen, fighting for the Protestant cause against the Spanish. During the battle, he was shot in the thigh and died of gangrene 26 days later, at the age of 31. One account says this death was avoidable and heroic. Sidney noticed that one of his men was not fully armoured. He took off his thigh armour on the grounds that it would be wrong to be better armoured than his men. As he lay dying, Sidney composed a song to be sung by his deathbed. According to the story, while lying wounded he gave his water to another wounded soldier, saying, "Thy necessity is yet greater than mine". This became possibly the most famous story about Sir Philip, intended to illustrate his noble and gallant character.

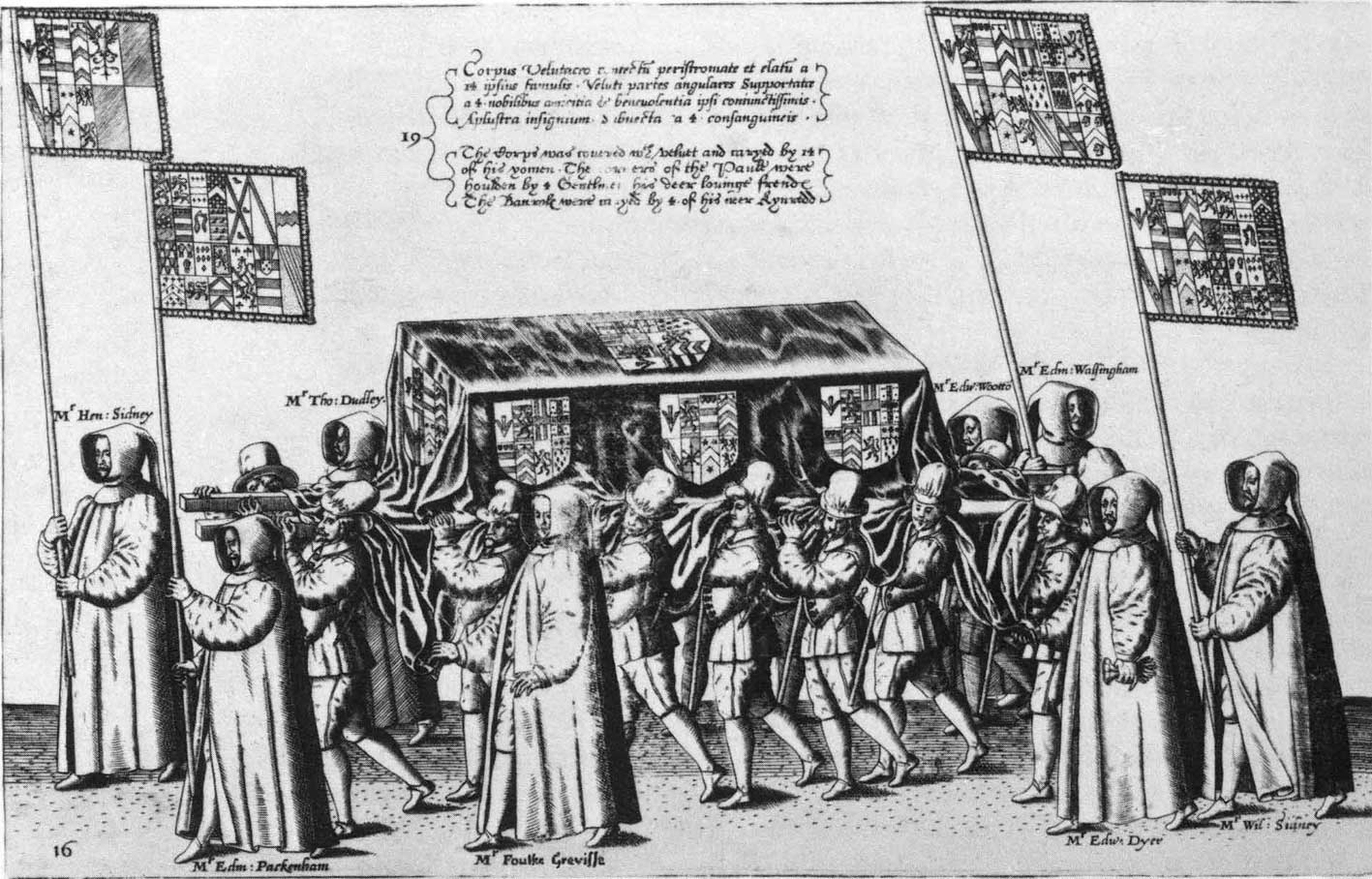
The funeral of Sir Philip Sidney, 1586

Sidney's body was returned to London and interred in Old St Paul's Cathedral on 16 February 1587. The grave and monument were destroyed in the Great Fire of London in 1666. A modern monument in the crypt lists his among the important graves lost.

Already during his own lifetime, but even more after his death, he had become for many English people the very epitome of a Castiglione courtier: learned and politic, but at the same time generous, brave, and impulsive. The funeral procession was one of the most elaborate ever staged, so much so that his father-in-law, Francis Walsingham, almost went bankrupt. As Sidney was a brother of the Worshipful Company of Grocers, the procession included 120 of his company brethren.

Never more than a marginal figure in the politics of his time, he was memorialised as the flower of English manhood in Edmund Spenser's Astrophel, one of the greatest English Renaissance elegies.

An early biography of Sidney was written by his devoted friend and schoolfellow, Fulke Greville. While Sidney was traditionally depicted as a staunch and unwavering Protestant, recent biographers such as Katherine Duncan-Jones have suggested that his religious loyalties were more ambiguous. He was known to be friendly and sympathetic towards individual Catholics.

== Works ==
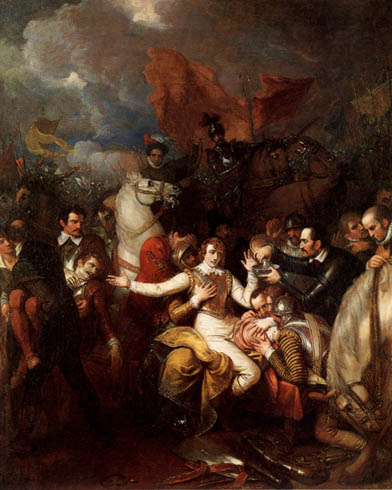
The Fatal Wounding of Sir Philip Sidney by Benjamin West, 1806

- The Lady of May – This is one of Sidney's lesser-known works, a masque written and performed for Queen Elizabeth in 1578 or 1579.
- Astrophil and Stella – The first of the famous English sonnet sequences, Astrophil and Stella was probably composed in the early 1580s. The sonnets were well-circulated in manuscript before the first (apparently pirated) edition was printed in 1591; only in 1598 did an authorised edition reach the press. The sequence was a watershed in English Renaissance poetry. In it, Sidney partially nativised the key features of his Italian model, Petrarch: variation of emotion from poem to poem, with the attendant sense of an ongoing, but partly obscure, narrative; the philosophical trappings; the musings on the act of poetic creation itself. His experiments with rhyme scheme were no less notable; they served to free the English sonnet from the strict rhyming requirements of the Italian form.
- The Countess of Pembroke's Arcadia – The Arcadia, by far Sidney's most ambitious work, was as significant in its own way as his sonnets. The work is a romance that combines pastoral elements with a mood derived from the Hellenistic model of Heliodorus. In the work, that is, a highly idealised version of the shepherd's life adjoins (not always naturally) with stories of jousts, political treachery, kidnappings, battles, and rapes. As published in the sixteenth century, the narrative follows the Greek model: stories are nested within each other, and different storylines are intertwined. The work enjoyed great popularity for more than a century after its publication. William Shakespeare borrowed from it for the Gloucester subplot of King Lear; parts of it were also dramatised by John Day and James Shirley. According to a widely told story, King Charles I quoted lines from the book as he mounted the scaffold to be executed; Samuel Richardson named the heroine of his first novel Pamela; or, Virtue Rewarded after Sidney's Pamela. Arcadia exists in two significantly different versions. Sidney wrote an early version (the Old Arcadia) during a stay at Mary Herbert's house; this version is narrated in a straightforward, sequential manner. Later, Sidney began to revise the work on a more ambitious plan, with much more backstory about the princes, and a much more complicated story-line, with many more characters. He completed most of the first three books, but the project was unfinished at the time of his death – the third book breaks off in the middle of a sword fight. There were several early editions of the book. Fulke Greville published the revised version alone, in 1590. The Countess of Pembroke, Sidney's sister, published a version in 1593, which pasted the last two books of the first version onto the first three books of the revision. In the 1621 version, Sir William Alexander provided a bridge to bring the two stories back into agreement. It was known in this cobbled-together fashion until the discovery, in the early twentieth century, of the earlier version.
- An Apology for Poetry (also known as A Defence of Poesie and The Defence of Poetry) – Sidney wrote Defence of Poetry before 1583. It has taken its place among the great critical essays in English. It is generally believed that he was at least partly motivated by Stephen Gosson, a former playwright who dedicated his attack on the English stage, The School of Abuse, to Sidney in 1579, but Sidney primarily addresses more general objections to poetry, such as those of Plato. In his essay, Sidney integrates a number of classical and Italian precepts on fiction. The essence of his defence is that poetry, by combining the liveliness of history with the ethical focus of philosophy, is more effective than either history or philosophy in rousing its readers to virtue. The work also offers important comments on Edmund Spenser and the Elizabethan stage.
- The Sidney Psalms – These English translations of the Psalms were completed in 1599 by Philip Sidney's sister Mary.

== In popular culture ==
A memorial, erected in 1986 at the location in Zutphen where he was mortally wounded by the Spanish, can be found at the entrance of a footpath (" 't Gallee") located in front of the petrol station at the Warnsveldseweg 170.

In Arnhem, in front of the house in the Bakkerstraat 68, an inscription on the ground reads: "IN THIS HOUSE DIED ON THE 17 OCTOBER 1586 * SIR PHILIP SIDNEY * ENGLISH POET, DIPLOMAT AND SOLDIER, FROM HIS WOUNDS SUFFERED AT THE BATTLE OF ZUTPHEN. HE GAVE HIS LIFE FOR OUR FREEDOM". The inscription was unveiled on 17 October 2011, exactly 425 years after his death, in the presence of Philip Sidney, 2nd Viscount De L'Isle, a descendant of the brother of Philip Sidney.

The city of Sidney, Ohio, in the United States and a street in Zutphen, Netherlands, have been named after Sir Philip. A statue of him can be found in the park at the Coehoornsingel where, in the harsh winter of 1795, English and Hanoverian soldiers were buried who had died while retreating from advancing French troops.

Another statue of Sidney, by Arthur George Walker, forms the centrepiece of the Old Salopians Memorial at Shrewsbury School to alumni who died serving in World War I (unveiled 1924).

Philip Sidney appears as a young man in Elizabeth Goudge's fourth novel, Towers in the Mist (Duckworth, 1938), visiting Oxford around the time Queen Elizabeth also visited Oxford in 1566. (Goudge admitted to slightly advancing the time of Sidney's arrival in Oxford, for the sake of her larger story.)

In the Monty Python's Flying Circus sketches "Tudor Jobs Agency", "Pornographic Bookshop" and "Elizabethan Pornography Smugglers" (Season 3, episode 10), Superintendent Gaskell, a vice squad policeman, is transported back to the Elizabethan age and assumes Sir Philip Sidney's identity.

An epitaph of Sir Philip Sidney:

England has his body, for she it fed;
Netherlands his blood, in her defence shed;
The Heavens have his soul,
The Arts have his fame,
The soldier his grief,
The world his good name.

In W. B. Yeats' poem In Memory of Major Robert Gregory, Yeats refers to Gregory as "Our Sidney and our perfect man" in stanza VI.

The hard-boiled detective fiction author Raymond Chandler named his character Philip Marlowe after Sir Philip Sidney (and Christopher Marlowe).

Military offices
Preceded by The Earl of Warwick	Master-General of the Ordnance (jointly with The Earl of Warwick); 1585–1586	Succeeded by The Earl of Warwick
