= Mary Dudley =

Lady-in-waiting to Elizabeth I of England

Lady Mary Dudley
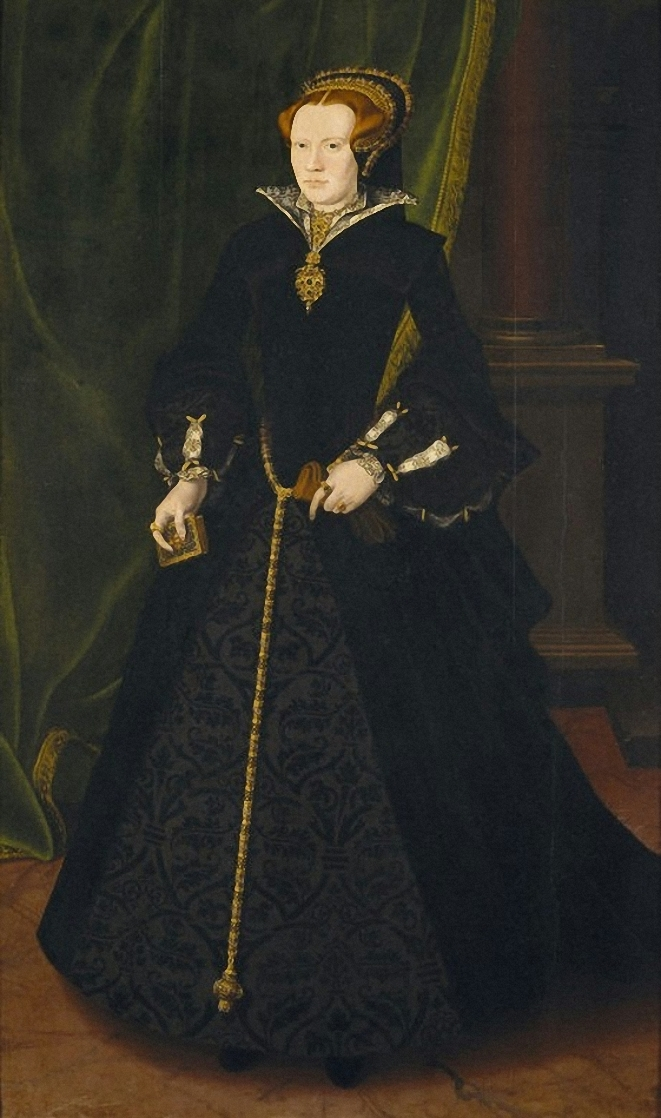
- Mary Sidney by Hans Eworth, c. 1550–1555
- Born: c. 1530–1535
- Died: 9 August 1586 (aged 50–56); London, England
- Buried: Penshurst Place, Kent
- Noble family: Dudley
- Spouse: Henry Sidney (m.1551)
- Issue: Sir Philip Sidney; Mary Margaret Sidney; Elizabeth Sidney; Mary Herbert, Countess of Pembroke; Robert Sidney, 1st Earl of Leicester; Ambrosia Sidney; Sir Thomas Sidney
- Father: John Dudley, 1st Duke of Northumberland
- Mother: Jane Guildford
- Occupation: Lady-in-Waiting

Lady Mary Sidney (née Dudley; c. 1530–1535 – 9 August 1586) was a lady-in-waiting at the court of Elizabeth I, wife of Sir Henry Sidney and the mother of Sir Philip Sidney and Mary Sidney Herbert, Countess of Pembroke. She was daughter of John Dudley, Duke of Northumberland, and sister of Elizabeth's favourite, Robert Dudley, Earl of Leicester.

Although she was marginally implicated in her father's attempt to place Lady Jane Grey on the English throne and affected by his attainder, Mary Dudley was one of Queen Elizabeth's most intimate confidantes during the early years of her reign. Her duties included nursing the Queen through smallpox in 1562 and acting as her mouthpiece towards diplomats. She was the mother of seven children and accompanied her husband, Sir Henry Sidney, to Ireland and the Welsh Marches. From the 1570s the couple complained repeatedly about their, as they saw it, poor treatment at the Queen's hands. Still one of Elizabeth's favourite ladies, Mary Dudley retired from court life in 1579, suffering from ill health during her last years.

== Family and early years of marriage ==
Mary Dudley was the eldest daughter among the thirteen children of John Dudley, 1st Duke of Northumberland and his wife Jane Guildford. Mary Dudley was well-educated. Fluent in Italian, French, and Latin, she was interested in alchemy, romances, and writing poetry. Her copy of Edward Hall's Chronicles bears her annotations in French. She also became a friend, correspondent and frequent visitor of the scientist and magus John Dee.

On 29 March 1551 Mary Dudley married Henry Sidney at Esher, Surrey. Possibly a love match, the ceremony was repeated in public on 17 May 1551 at her parents' house Ely Place, London. Four months later Henry Sidney became Chief Gentleman of Edward VI's Privy Chamber; he was knighted by the young King on the day his father-in-law, who headed the government, was raised to the dukedom of Northumberland.

In May 1553 Mary's second youngest brother, Guildford Dudley, was married to Edward's favourite cousin, Lady Jane Grey. According to Lady Jane it was Mary Dudley who, on 9 July 1553, called upon her to bring her to Syon House, the place where she was informed she was Queen of England according to King Edward's will. After Mary I's triumph within a fortnight and the arrest and execution of the Duke of Northumberland, the Sidneys were in a precarious situation. Like the rest of the Dudley family, Mary Dudley was attainted and suffered the consequences in her legal status. Henry Sidney's three sisters, however, were favourite ladies of Queen Mary, which may have saved his career. In early 1554 he went with an embassy to Spain to plead with England's prospective king consort, Philip, for the pardon of his brothers-in-law John, Ambrose, Robert, and Henry. John Dudley, the eldest brother, died days after his release in October 1554 at Penshurst Place in Kent, the Sidneys' manor house granted to them by Edward VI in 1552. Philip Sidney, Mary Dudley's first child, was born there in November 1554 and named after his godfather, the King. His godmother, the widowed Duchess of Northumberland, died in January 1555. She left her daughter 200 marks as well as a cherished clock "that was the lord her father's, praying her to keep it as a jewel."

In 1556 Mary Dudley went with her husband to Ireland, where they resided mostly at Athlone Castle. Their first daughter, Mary Margaret, was born some time after their arrival. Queen Mary acted as godmother, but the child died at "one year and three quarters old". Meanwhile, the infant Philip stayed behind at Penshurst until his mother returned from Ireland in September 1558. She had been restored in blood earlier in the year when the Dudleys' attainder was lifted by Mary I's last parliament.

== Serving Elizabeth I ==
On Elizabeth I's accession in November 1558 Mary Dudley became a Gentlewoman of the Privy Chamber "without wages", an unsalaried position which left her dependent on her husband. Like her brother Lord Robert, the royal favourite, she was among the Queen's closest companions. In the 1559 negotiations over Archduke Charles, the Habsburg candidate for Elizabeth's hand, she acted as go-between for the Queen and her own brother in their dealings with the Spanish ambassador Álvaro de la Quadra and his Imperial colleague, Caspar von Brüner. Through Mary Dudley, Elizabeth discreetly indicated her serious intention to marry the Archduke and that he should immediately come to England. De la Quadra informed Philip II that

Mary Dudley said that if this were not true, I might be sure she would not say such a thing as it might cost her her life and she was acting now with the Queen's consent, but she (the Queen) would not speak to the Emperor's ambassador about it.

Philip's envoy received assurances from Lord Robert and Sir Thomas Parry as well. Yet Elizabeth cooled down again and gave Mary Dudley further instructions to deal with the Spaniards, until she herself told de la Quadra "that someone had [spoken to him] with good intentions, but without any commission from her". Angry at her brother and the Queen, Mary Dudley felt betrayed. The Spanish ambassador, in his turn, was piqued that she used an interpreter, when "we can understand each other in Italian without him."

In October 1562, Elizabeth became critically ill with smallpox; Mary Dudley nursed her until she contracted the illness herself, which according to her husband greatly disfigured her beauty. The Queen, who suffered only a little pocking, distanced herself from her once friend. That Mary took to wearing a mask afterwards is, however, a myth. She continued her court service, unless absent when accompanying her husband to Wales and Ireland. In late 1565 the couple travelled to Ireland, where Sir Henry was to take up his post as Lord Lieutenant. On the passage one of the ships sank with all Mary Dudley's jewels and fine clothes on board. In 1567 Henry Sidney returned for a few weeks to the English court. His wife stayed behind at Drogheda, which came under rebel attack. Mary Dudley resolutely requested the Mayor of Dublin to relieve the town with troops, which he did. Later in the year Sir Henry sent her back to England because of her ill health, which was apparently caused by the Queen's criticism of his lieutenantship: An unfriendly letter from Elizabeth "so perplexed my dear wife, as she fell most grievously sick upon the same and in that sickness remained once in trance above fifty-two hours".

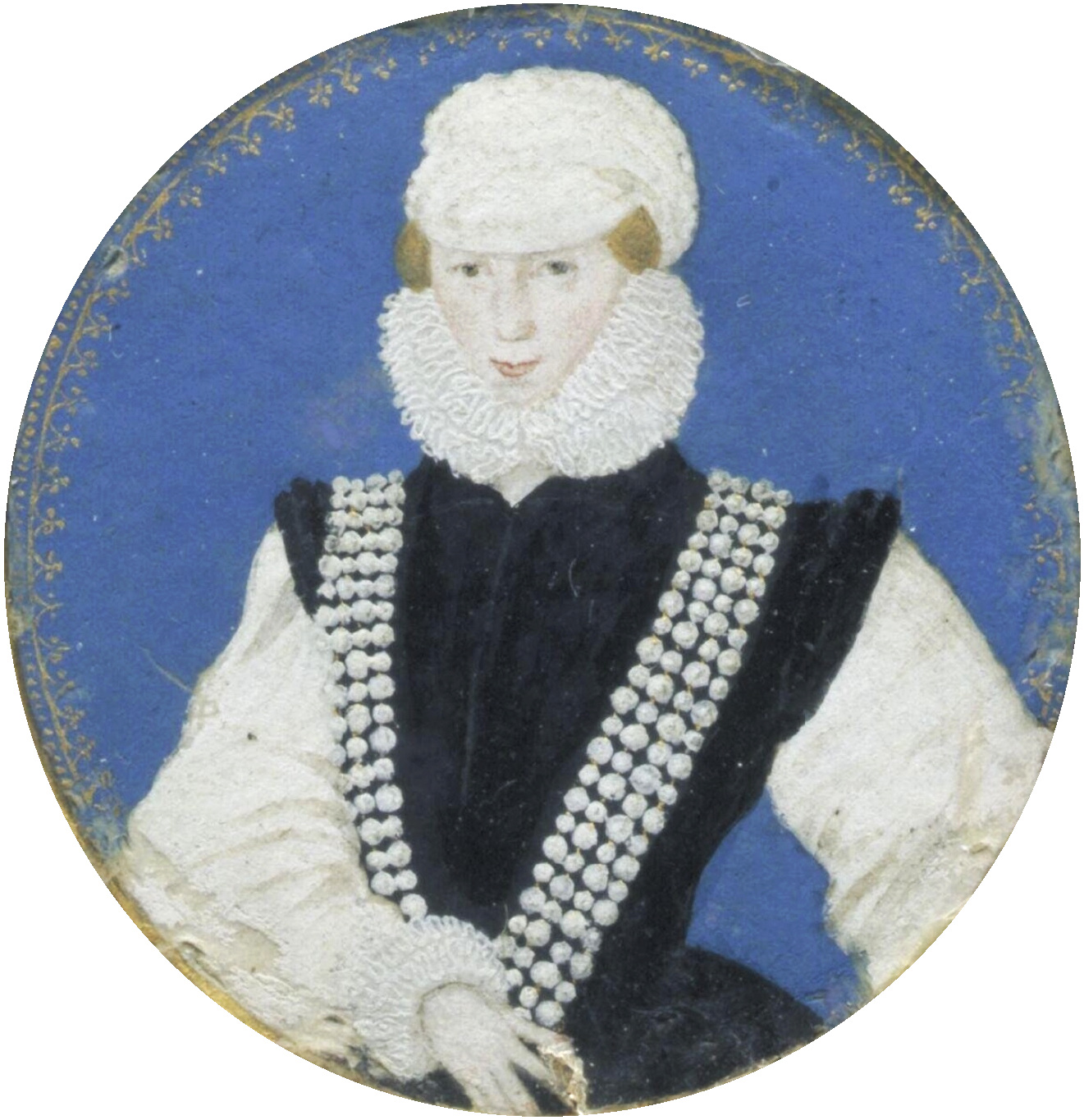
Portrait miniature attributed to Levina Teerlinc, c. 1575

The four Dudley siblings who survived into Elizabeth's reign, Mary, Ambrose, Robert, and their much younger sister Katherine, kept a close bond among themselves, while Henry Sidney and Robert Dudley had been friends since their common schooldays with Edward VI. Mary Dudley's third child Elizabeth was born at her brother Robert's house at Kew in late 1560. Until 1569 she had four more children, among them the future Countess of Pembroke and poet Mary Herbert, and Robert, who became the first Sidney Earl of Leicester. The death of her nine-year-old daughter Ambrosia in 1575 elicited a letter of condolences from Queen Elizabeth. In 1573 an apothecary had supplied "oil of camenall and capers", syrups, and a box of marmalade for "Mistress Ambrocia."

Henry Sidney being once again in Ireland, in January 1570 Robert Dudley entertained his brother Ambrose as well as "Sister Mary" and "Sister Kate" at Kenilworth. The same castle was the scene of the great festival of 1575, at which the whole Sidney family were guests and Mary Dudley excelled in stag hunting. In 1577 Robert Dudley negotiated the match of his 15-year-old niece Mary with his friend, the 40-year-old Earl of Pembroke. Her mother organized the wedding festivities at Wilton House.

By the 1570s, Sir Henry Sidney and his wife had become somewhat disillusioned and embittered about lacking financial rewards on the Queen's part for their long service. In 1572 Mary Dudley even had to decline a barony for her husband in a letter to William Cecil, himself Baron Burghley since the previous year: The expenses such a title implied were simply too great, Sir Henry's mind being "dismayed [by the] hard choice" between choosing financial ruin and royal displeasure "in refusing it". Two years later, in 1574, she quarrelled with the Lord Chamberlain (her brother-in-law, the Earl of Sussex) over accommodation at court. She refused to exchange her accustomed rooms with a cold chamber that had previously been "but the place for my servants". All in all though, she explained, "old Lord Harry and his old Moll" would accept "like good friends the small portion allotted our long service in court; which as little as it is, seems something too much."

Elizabeth was still attached to her old friend when Mary Dudley left the court in July 1579—because of bad health, or out of solidarity with her brother Robert, Earl of Leicester, who was in disgrace for having married. She joined her husband at Ludlow in 1582, where he was serving his third turn as President of the Council of Wales. A year later her health was in such a state that Henry Sidney believed he would soon have the opportunity to take a second wife. Mary Dudley died on 9 August 1586, three months after her husband, in whose elaborate funeral she had participated. She was buried by his side at Penshurst.

== Issue ==
- Sir Philip Sidney (1554–1586); married Frances Walsingham in 1583 and had issue.
- Mary Margaret Sidney (died as a child)
- Elizabeth Sidney (died as a child)
- Mary Sidney (1561–1621); married Henry Herbert, 2nd Earl of Pembroke, in 1577 and had issue.
- Robert Sidney, 1st Earl of Leicester (1563–1626); married firstly Barbara Gamage and had issue. Married secondly Sarah Blount.
- Ambrosia Sidney (died as a child)
- Sir Thomas Sidney

== Ancestry ==
Ancestors of Mary Dudley

16. John Sutton, 1st Baron Dudley
8. Sir John Dudley of Atherington
17. Elizabeth de Berkeley of Beverstone
4. Edmund Dudley
18. Sir John Bramshott of Bramshott
9. Elizabeth Bramshott
19. Catherine Pelham
2. John Dudley, 1st Duke of Northumberland
20. Edward Grey, 6th Baron Ferrers of Groby
10. Edward Grey, 1st Viscount Lisle
21. Elizabeth Ferrers, 6th Baroness Ferrers of Groby
5. Elizabeth Grey, 6th Baroness Lisle
22. John Talbot, 1st Viscount Lisle
11. Elizabeth Talbot, 3rd Baroness Lisle
23. Joan Cheddar
1. Mary Dudley
24. Sir John Guildford
12. Sir Richard Guildford
25. Alice Waller
6. Sir Edward Guildford
26. John Pimpe of Pimpe's Court
13. Anne Pimpe
3. Jane Guildford
28. Richard West, 7th Baron De La Warr
14. Thomas West, 8th Baron De La Warr
29. Catherine Hungerford
7. Eleanor West
30. Hugh Mortimer of Mortimer's Hall
15. Elizabeth Mortimer
31. Eleanor Cornwall
