= Mary Sidney =

English poet, playwright and patron (1561–1621)

The Right Honourable The Countess of Pembroke
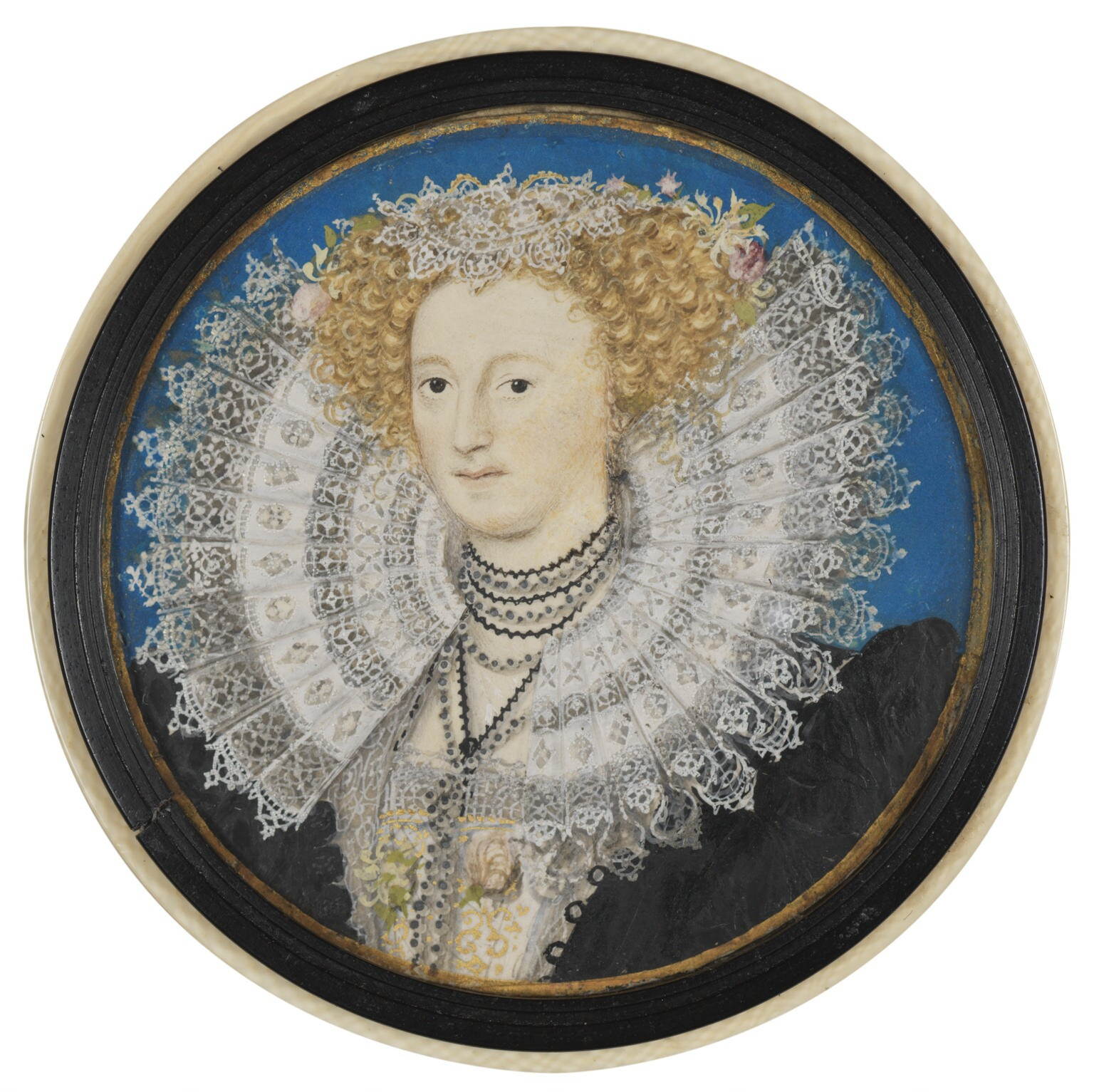
- Portrait of Mary Herbert (née Sidney), by Nicholas Hilliard, c. 1590.

Countess of Pembroke
- Tenure: April 1577 - 19 January 1601
- Known for: Literary patron, author
- Born: 27 October 1561; Tickenhill Palace, Bewdley, England
- Died: 25 September 1621 (aged 59); London, England
- Buried: Salisbury Cathedral
- Noble family: Sidney
- Spouse: Henry Herbert, 2nd Earl of Pembroke
- Issue: William Herbert, 3rd Earl of Pembroke; Katherine Herbert; Anne Herbert; Philip Herbert, 4th Earl of Pembroke
- Father: Henry Sidney
- Mother: Mary Dudley

Mary Herbert, Countess of Pembroke (née Sidney, 27 October 1561 – 25 September 1621) was among the first Englishwomen to gain notice for her poetry and her literary patronage. By the age of 39, she was listed with her brother Philip Sidney and with Edmund Spenser and William Shakespeare among the notable authors of the day in John Bodenham's verse miscellany Belvidere. Her play Antonius (a translation of Robert Garnier's Marc Antoine) is widely seen as reviving interest in soliloquy based on classical models and as a likely source of Samuel Daniel's closet drama Cleopatra (1594) and of Shakespeare's Antony and Cleopatra (1607). (Note: Each portrays the lovers as "heroic victims of their own passionate excesses and remorseless destiny".Shakespeare (1990, p. 7)) She was also known for translating Petrarch's "Triumph of Death", for the poetry anthology Triumphs, and above all for a lyrical, metrical translation of the Psalms.

== Biography ==
=== Early life ===
Mary Sidney was born on 27 October 1561 at Tickenhill Palace in the parish of Bewdley, Worcestershire. She was one of the seven children – three sons and four daughters – of Sir Henry Sidney and wife Mary Dudley. Their eldest son was Sir Philip Sidney (1554–1586), and their second son Robert Sidney (1563–1626), who later became Earl of Leicester. As a child, she spent much time at court where her mother was a gentlewoman of the Privy Chamber and a close confidante of Queen Elizabeth I. Like her brother Philip, she received a humanist education which included music, needlework, and Latin, French and Italian. After the death of Sidney's youngest sister, Ambrosia, in 1575, the Queen requested that Mary return to court to join the royal entourage.

=== Marriage and children ===
Arms of Herbert: Per pale azure and gules, three lions rampant argent

In 1577, Mary Sidney married Henry Herbert, 2nd Earl of Pembroke (1538–1601), a close ally of the family. The marriage was arranged by her father in concert with her uncle, Robert Dudley, Earl of Leicester. After her marriage, Mary became responsible with her husband for the management of a number of estates which he owned including Ramsbury, Ivychurch, Wilton House, and Baynard's Castle in London, where it is known that they entertained Queen Elizabeth to dinner. She had four children by her husband:

- William Herbert, 3rd Earl of Pembroke (1580–1630), was the eldest son and heir.
- Katherine Herbert (1581–1584) died as an infant.
- Anne Herbert (born 1583 – after 1603) was thought also to have been a writer and a storyteller.
- Philip Herbert, 4th Earl of Pembroke (1584–1650), succeeded his brother in 1630. Philip and his older brother William were the "incomparable pair of brethren" to whom the First Folio of Shakespeare's collected works was dedicated in 1623.

Mary Sidney was an aunt to the poet Mary Wroth, daughter of her brother Robert.

=== Later life ===
The death of Sidney's husband in 1601 left her with less financial support than she might have expected, though views on its adequacy vary; at the time the majority of an estate was left to the eldest son.

In addition to the arts, Sidney had a range of interests. She had a chemistry laboratory at Wilton House, where she developed medicines and invisible ink. From 1609 to 1615, Mary Sidney probably spent most of her time at Crosby Hall in London.

She travelled with her doctor, Matthew Lister, to Spa, Belgium in 1616. Dudley Carleton met her in the company of Helene de Melun, "Countess of Berlaymont", wife of Florent de Berlaymont the governor of Luxembourg. The two women amused themselves with pistol shooting. Sir John Throckmorton heard she went on to Amiens. There is conjecture that she married Lister, but no evidence of this.

She died of smallpox on 25 September 1621, aged 59, at her townhouse in Aldersgate Street in London, shortly after King James I had visited her at the newly completed Houghton House in Bedfordshire. After a grand funeral in St Paul's Cathedral, her body was buried in Salisbury Cathedral, next to that of her late husband in the Herbert family vault, under the steps leading to the choir stalls, where the mural monument still stands.

== Literary career ==
=== Wilton House ===
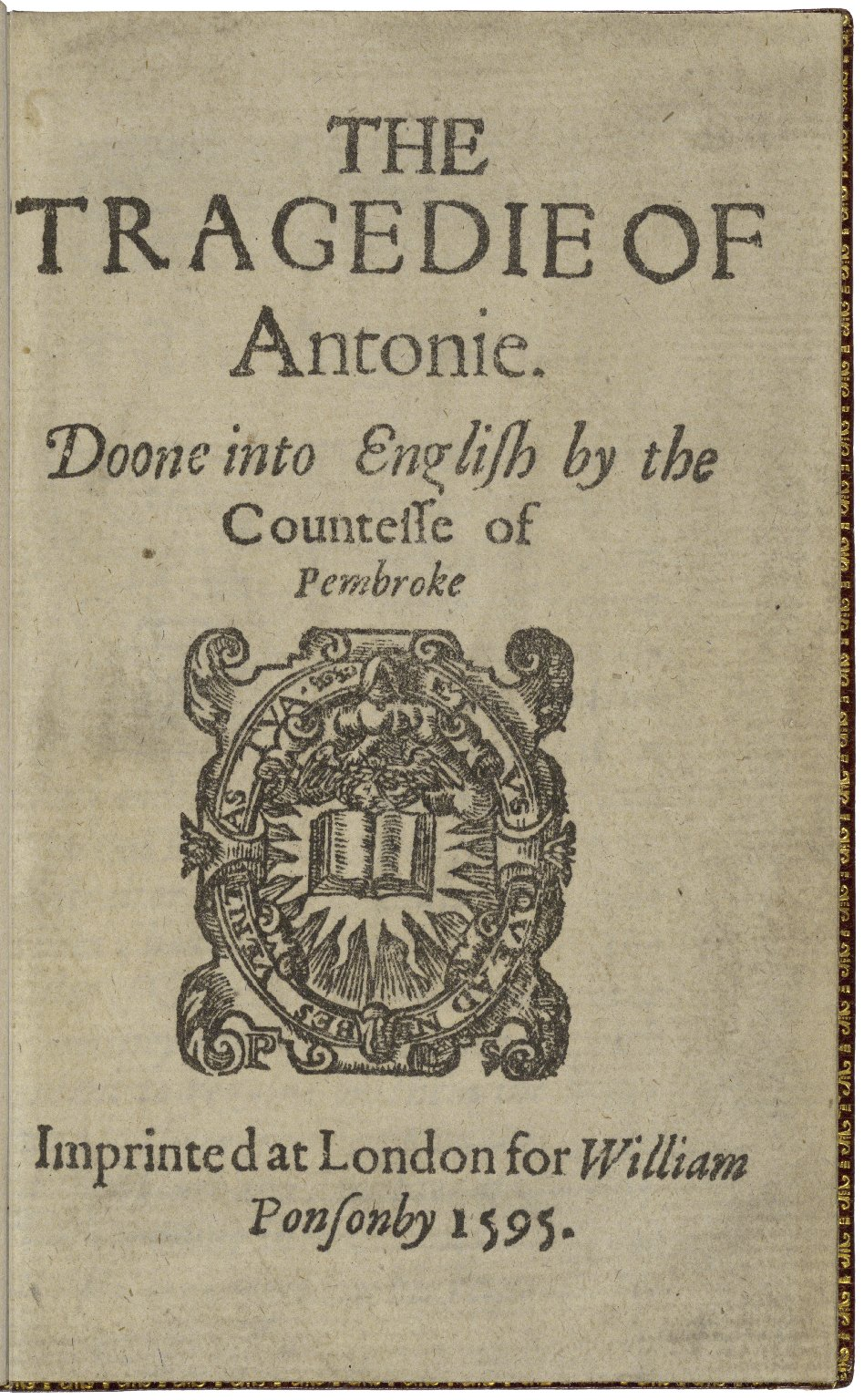
The title page of Sidney's The Tragedy of Antony, her interpretation of the story of Mark Antony and Cleopatra.

Mary Sidney turned Wilton House into a "paradise for poets", known as the "Wilton Circle", a salon-type literary group sustained by her hospitality, which included Edmund Spenser, Samuel Daniel, Michael Drayton, Ben Jonson, and Sir John Davies. John Aubrey wrote, "Wilton House was like a college, there were so many learned and ingenious persons. She was the greatest patroness of wit and learning of any lady in her time." It has been suggested that the premiere of Shakespeare's As You Like It was at Wilton during her life.

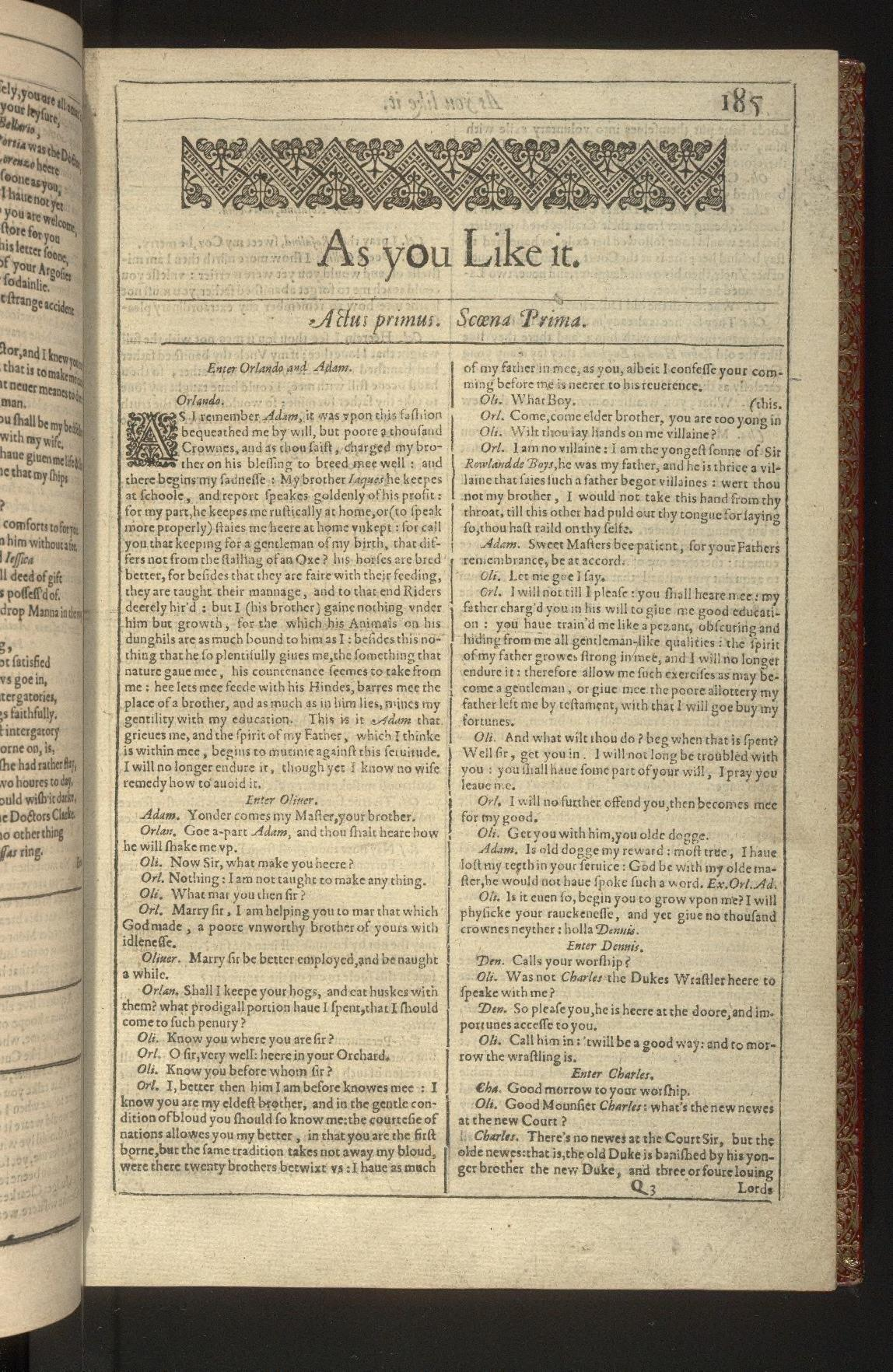
First page of As You Like It from the First Folio of Shakespeare's plays; the first performance of the play may have been at Mary Sidney's house at Wilton

Sidney received more dedications than any other woman of non-royal status. By some accounts, King James I visited Wilton on his way to his coronation in 1603 and stayed again at Wilton following the coronation to avoid the plague. She was regarded as a muse by Daniel in his sonnet cycle "Delia", an anagram for ideal.

Her brother, Philip Sidney, wrote much of his Arcadia in her presence, at Wilton House. He also probably began preparing his English lyric version of the Book of Psalms at Wilton as well.

=== Sidney psalter ===
Philip Sidney had completed translating 43 of the 150 Psalms at the time of his death on a military campaign against the Spanish in the Netherlands in 1586. She finished his translation, composing Psalms 44 through to 150 in a dazzling array of verse forms, using the 1560 Geneva Bible and commentaries by John Calvin and Theodore Beza. Hallett Smith has called the psalter a "School of English Versification" Smith (1946), of 171 poems (Psalm 119 is a gathering of 22 separate ones). A copy of the completed psalter was prepared for Queen Elizabeth I in 1599, in anticipation of a royal visit to Wilton, but Elizabeth cancelled her planned visit. This work is usually referred to as The Sidney Psalms or The Sidney-Pembroke Psalter and regarded as a major influence on the development of English religious lyric poetry in the late 16th and early 17th centuries. John Donne wrote a poem celebrating the verse psalter and claiming he could "scarce" call the English Church reformed until its psalter had been modelled after the poetic transcriptions of Philip Sidney and Mary Herbert.

Although the psalms were not printed in her lifetime, they were extensively distributed in manuscript. There are 17 manuscripts extant today. A later engraving of Herbert shows her holding them. (Note: Mary Herbert as illustrated in Horace Walpole, A Catalogue of the Royal and Noble Authors of England, Scotland, and Ireland.) Her literary influence can be seen in literary patronage, in publishing her brother's works and in her own verse forms, dramas, and translations. Contemporary poets who commended Herbert's psalms include Samuel Daniel, Sir John Davies, John Donne, Michael Drayton, Sir John Harington, Ben Jonson, Emilia Lanier and Thomas Moffet. The importance of these is evident in the devotional lyrics of Barnabe Barnes, Nicholas Breton, Henry Constable, Francis Davison, Giles Fletcher, and Abraham Fraunce. Their influence on the later religious poetry of Donne, George Herbert, Henry Vaughan, and John Milton has been critically recognized since Louis Martz placed it at the start of a developing tradition of 17th-century devotional lyricism.

Sidney was instrumental in bringing her brother's An Apology for Poetry or Defence of Poesy into print. She circulated the Sidney–Pembroke Psalter in manuscript at about the same time. This suggests a common purpose in their design. Both argued, in formally different ways, for the ethical recuperation of poetry as an instrument for moral instruction — particularly religious instruction. Sidney also took on editing and publishing her brother's Arcadia, which he claimed to have written in her presence as The Countesse of Pembroke's Arcadia.

=== Other works ===
Sidney's closet drama Antonius is a translation of a French play, Marc-Antoine (1578) by Robert Garnier. Mary is known to have translated two other works: A Discourse of Life and Death by Philippe de Mornay, published with Antonius in 1592, and Petrarch's The Triumph of Death, circulated in manuscript. Her original poems include the pastoral "A Dialogue betweene Two Shepheards, Thenot and Piers, in praise of Astrea," and two dedicatory addresses, one to Elizabeth I and one to her own brother Philip, contained in the Tixall manuscript copy of her verse psalter. An elegy for Philip, "The dolefull lay of Clorinda", was published in Colin Clouts Come Home Againe (1595) and attributed to Spenser and to Mary Herbert, but Pamela Coren attributes it to Spenser, though also saying that Mary's poetic reputation does not suffer from loss of the attribution.

By at least 1591, the Pembrokes were providing patronage to a playing company, Pembroke's Men, one of the early companies to perform works of Shakespeare. According to one account, Shakespeare's company "The King's Men" performed at Wilton at this time.

June and Paul Schlueter published an article in The Times Literary Supplement of 23 July 2010 describing a manuscript of newly discovered works by Mary Sidney Herbert.

Her poetic epitaph, ascribed to Ben Jonson but more likely to have been written in an earlier form by the poets William Browne and her son William, summarizes how she was regarded in her own day:

Underneath this sable hearse,
Lies the subject of all verse,
Sidney's sister, Pembroke's mother.
Death, ere thou hast slain another
Fair and learned and good as she,
Time shall throw a dart at thee.

Her literary talents and aforementioned connections to the theater and the royal court have led to her being considered one of the true authors of the works of Shakespeare in the Shakespeare authorship question.

== Ancestry ==
Ancestors of Mary Sidney

8. Nicholas Sidney
4. Sir William Sidney
9. Anne Brandon
2. Henry Sidney
10. Sir Hugh Pakenham
5. Anne Pakenham
1. Mary Sidney
12. Edmund Dudley
6. John Dudley
13. Elizabeth Grey
3. Mary Dudley
14. Edward Guildford
7. Jane Guildford
15. Eleanor West

== See also ==
- Isabella Whitney
- Sidney Psalms

== Sources ==
1. Adams, Simon (2008b) [2004], "Sidney [née Dudley], Mary, Lady Sidney", ODNB, OUP, doi:10.1093/ref:odnb/69749 (Subscription, Wikipedia Library access or UK public library membership required.)
2. Aubrey, John; Barber, Richard W (1982). Brief Lives. Boydell. ISBN 9780851152066.
3. Bodenham, John (1911) [1600]. Hoops, Johannes; Crawford, Charles (eds.). Belvidere, or the Garden of the Muses. Leipzig. pp. 198–228.
4. Britain Magazine, Natasha Foges (2017). "Mary Sidney: Countess of Pembroke and literary trailblazer". Britain Magazine | the Official Magazine of Visit Britain | Best of British History, Royal Family, Travel and Culture.
5. Chambers, Edmund Kerchever, ed. (1896). The Poems of John Donne. Introduction by George Saintsbury. Lawrence & Bullen/Routledge. pp. 188–190.
6. Coles, Kimberly Anne (2012). "Mary (Sidney) Herbert, countess of Pembroke". In Sullivan, Garrett A; Stewart, Alan; Lemon, Rebecca; McDowell, Nicholas; Richard, Jennifer (eds.). The Encyclopedia of English Renaissance Literature. Blackwell. ISBN 978-1405194495.
7. Coren, Pamela (2002). "Colin Clouts come home againe | Edmund Spenser, Mary Sidney, and the doleful lay". SEL: Studies in English Literature 1500–1900. 42 (1): 25–41. doi:10.1353/sel.2002.0003. ISSN 1522-9270. S2CID 162410376.
8. Daniel, Samuel (1592). "Delia".
9. Donne, John (1599) [1952]. "Upon the translation of the Psalmes by Sir Philip Sidney, and the Countesse of Pembroke his Sister". In Gardner, Helen (ed.). Divine Poems | Occassional [sic] Poems (subscription required). doi:10.1093/actrade/9780198118367.book.1. ISBN 978-0198118367.
10. Halliday, Frank Ernest (1977). A Shakespeare Companion 1564–1964. Penguin/Duckworth. ISBN 978-0715603093.
11. Hannay, Margaret; Kinnamon, Noel J; Brennan, Michael, eds. (1998). The Collected Works of Mary Sidney Herbert, Countess of Pembroke. Vol. I: Poems, Translations, and Correspondence. Clarendon. ISBN 978-0198112808. OCLC 37213729.
12. Hannay, Margaret Patterson (2008) [2004], "Herbert [née Sidney], Mary, countess of Pembroke", ODNB, OUP, doi:10.1093/ref:odnb/13040 (Subscription, Wikipedia Library access or UK public library membership required.)
13. Herbert, Mary (2014) [1599]. "A dialogue betweene two shepheards, Thenot and Piers, in praise of Astrea". In Goldring, Elizabeth; Eales, Faith; Clarke, Elizabeth; Archer, Jayne Elisabeth; Heaton, Gabriel; Knight, Sarah (eds.). John Nichols's The Progresses and Public Processions of Queen Elizabeth I: A New Edition of the Early Modern Sources. Vol. 4: 1596–1603. Produced by John Nichols and Richard Gough (1788). OUP. doi:10.1093/oseo/instance.00058002. ISBN 978-0199551415.
14. "June and Paul Schlueter Discover Unknown Poems by Mary Sidney Herbert, Countess of Pembroke". Lafayette News. Lafayette College. 23 Sep 2010.
15. Martz, Louis L (1954). The poetry of meditation: a study in English religious literature of the seventeenth century (2nd ed.). Yale UP. ISBN 978-0300001655. OCLC 17701003.
16. Pugh, R B; Crittall, E, eds. (1956). "Houses of Augustinian canons: Priory of Ivychurch". A History of the County of Wiltshire | British History Online. A History of the County of Wiltshire. Vol. III.
17. Shakespeare, William (1990) [1607]. Bevington, David M (ed.). Antony and Cleopatra. CUP. ISBN 978-0521272506.
18. Sidney, Philip (2003) [1590 published by William Ponsonby]. The Countess of Pembroke's Arcadia. Transcriptions: Heinrich Oskar Sommer (1891); Risa Stephanie Bear (2003). Renascence Editions, Oregon U.
19. Smith, Hallett (1946). "English Metrical Psalms in the Sixteenth Century and Their Literary Significance". Huntington Library Quarterly. 9 (3): 249–271. doi:10.2307/3816008. JSTOR 3816008.
20. Walpole, Horatio (1806). "Mary, Countess of Pembroke". A Catalogue of the Royal and Noble Authors of England, Scotland and Ireland; with Lists of Their Works. Vol. II. Enlarged and continued — Thomas Park. J Scott. pp. 198–207.
21. Williams, Franklin B (1962). The literary patronesses of Renaissance England. Vol. 9. pp. 364–366. doi:10.1093/nq/9-10-364b.
22. Williams, Robin P (2006). Sweet Swan of Avon: Did a woman write Shakespeare?. Peachpit. ISBN 978-0321426406.
23. Woudhuysen, H R (2014) [2004], "Sidney, Sir Philip", ODNB, OUP, doi:10.1093/ref:odnb/25522 (Subscription, Wikipedia Library access or UK public library membership required.)
