= Cultural depictions of Lady Jane Grey =

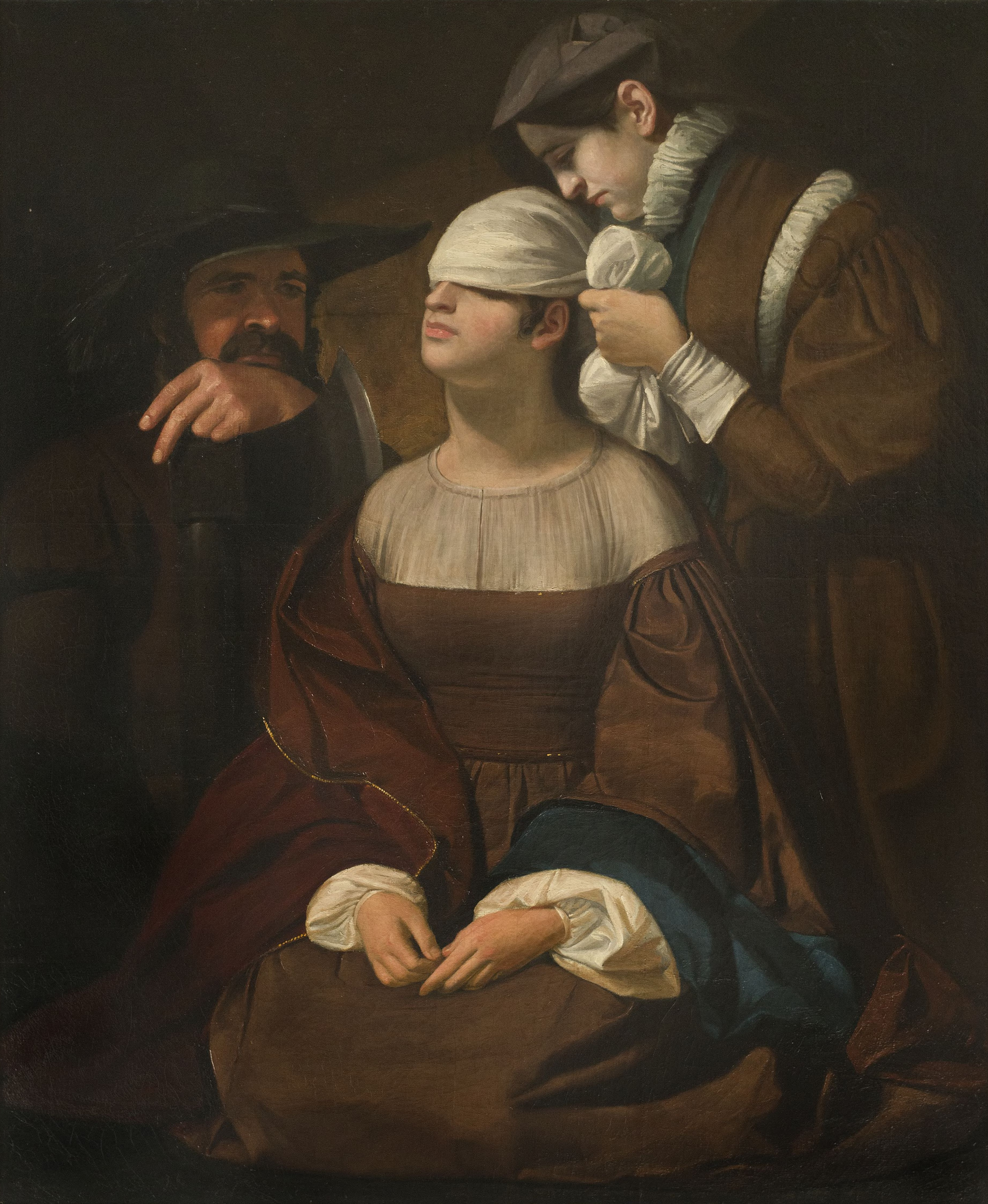
Lady Jane Grey Preparing for Execution, oil by George Whiting Flagg, 1835.

Lady Jane Grey, 16th-century claimant to the English throne, has left an abiding impression in English literature and romance. The limited amount of material from which to construct a source-based biography of her has not stopped authors of all ages filling the gaps with the fruits of their imagination.

Together with Mary, Queen of Scots and Jane's sister in law Amy Robsart, she forms a trinity of women whose sad ends especially obsessed the 19th-century British public, and her story has continued to be told in many works.

== Pre-19th century ==
In Elizabethan ballads, Jane's story is a tale of innocence betrayed. In one ballad Lady Jane, in denouncing her executioner Queen Mary I, declares "For Popery I hate as death / and Christ my saviour love." Jane is now not only an innocent but a martyr to the Protestant cause, and appears as such in Foxe's Book of Martyrs. On no certain evidence, she was also idealised in another way by Roger Ascham as noble and scholarly. But the greatest Elizabethan tribute to her came in Thomas Chaloner's Elegy, published in 1579. Here she is peerless in her learning and beauty, comparable only with Socrates for her courage and quiet resignation in the face of death. He even suggests that she was pregnant at the time of her execution, an assertion that appears nowhere else, presumably to make Mary, the great villain of the piece, appear all the more heartless.

From martyrology and poetry, Jane finally made it on to the stage in the early Jacobean period in Sir Thomas Wyatt by John Webster and Thomas Dekker, where she takes on the role of a tragic lover. The play was probably largely based on an earlier lost play called Lady Jane. This theme was taken up later in the century by John Banks, a Restoration playwright, in his Innocent Usurper: or, the Death of Lady Jane Grey. Here Jane is only persuaded to accept the crown after her husband, Lord Guilford Dudley, threatens to commit suicide if she does not. First printed after the Glorious Revolution, there is also a strong anti-Roman Catholic dimension to Banks's play, which presumably appealed to the audiences of the day.

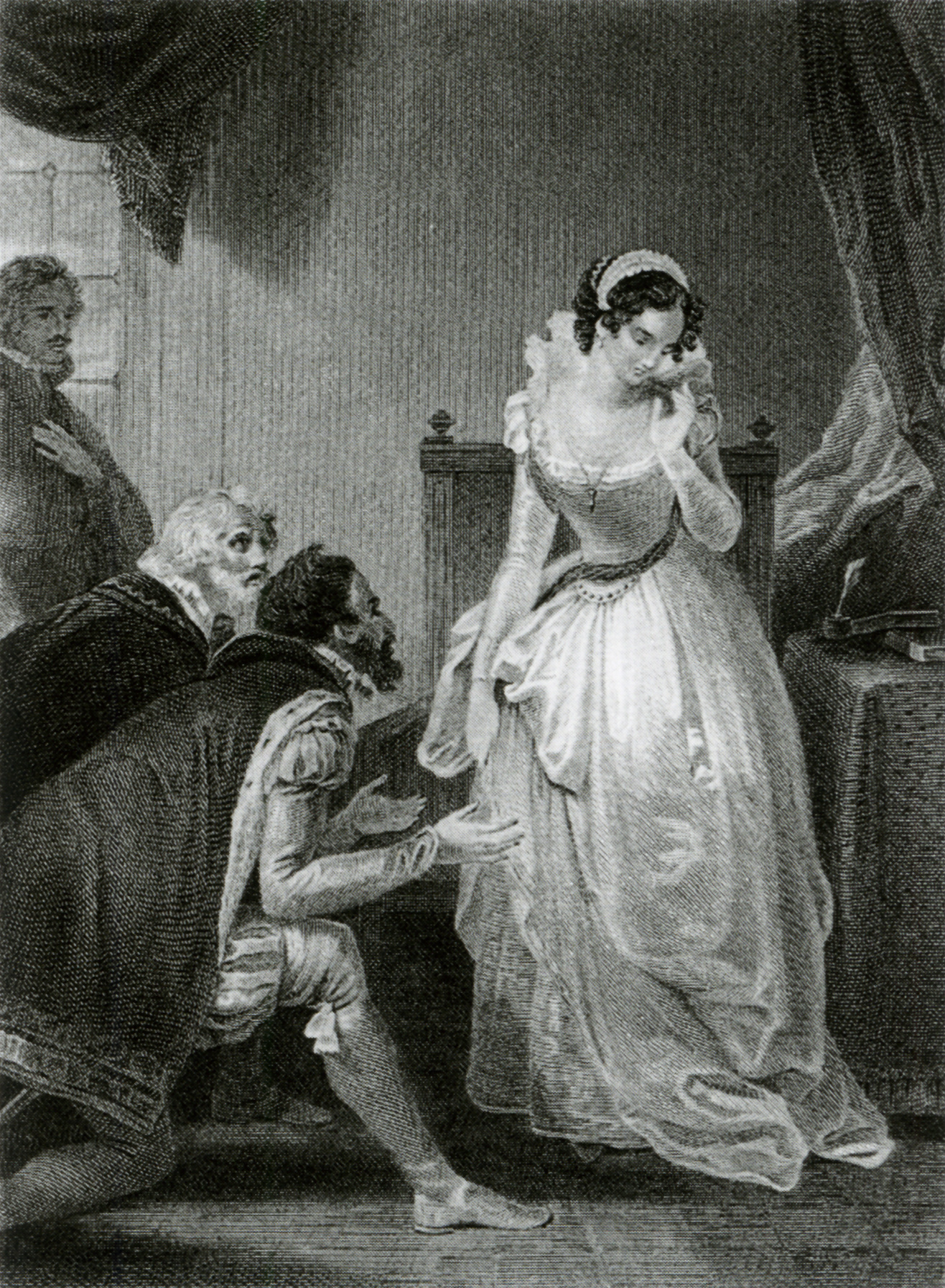
Depiction of Lady Jane Grey being asked to take the throne, as imagined in the Romantic era. Engraving after Robert Smirke

More plays and poems followed in the 18th century, when a small Janeite industry began to take shape. In the early Hanoverian period she takes on the role of political heroine as well as martyr, scholar and tragic lover, putting down her Plato and taking up the crown only to save English Protestantism. The 1715 she-tragedy entitled Lady Jane Grey: A Tragedy in Five Acts, by Nicholas Rowe, emphasizes the pathos of Jane's fate. Jane's growing reputation was not just a popular phenomenon. Gilbert Burnet, Whig historian and self-publicist, described Jane, with considerable exaggeration, as 'the wonder of the age' in his History of the Reformation, a phrase subsequently taken up by Oliver Goldsmith his History of England, published in 1771. Even the sober David Hume was seduced by the tragedy of Jane and Dudley.

== 19th century to present ==
It was not until the early nineteenth century that John Lingard, a Catholic historian, ventured a word or two of counter-adulation about Jane, saying that she 'liked dresses overmuch', and reminding her promoters that she was only sixteen. However, her popularity as a subject for tragic romance increased even further in the nineteenth century, an age of mass printing, where her story appears in a variety of media, including popular magazines and children's books. The 19th century also saw several operatic treatments of her story, including Nicola Vaccai's 1836 opera Giovanna Gray.

Jane was recast time and again to suit the inclinations of her audience. After the French Revolution, the evangelical movement alighted on her as a symbol, marked not for her romance but for her piety. In 1828 The Lady's Monitor declared that she inherited "every great, every good, every admirable quality, whether of mind, disposition, or person." The radical thinker and philosopher William Godwin called her "the most perfect young creature of the female sex to be found in history" in his own hagiography of Jane published under the pseudonym Theopilius Marcliffe. Mark Twain used Jane as a minor character in his 1882 novel, The Prince and the Pauper.

== In painting ==
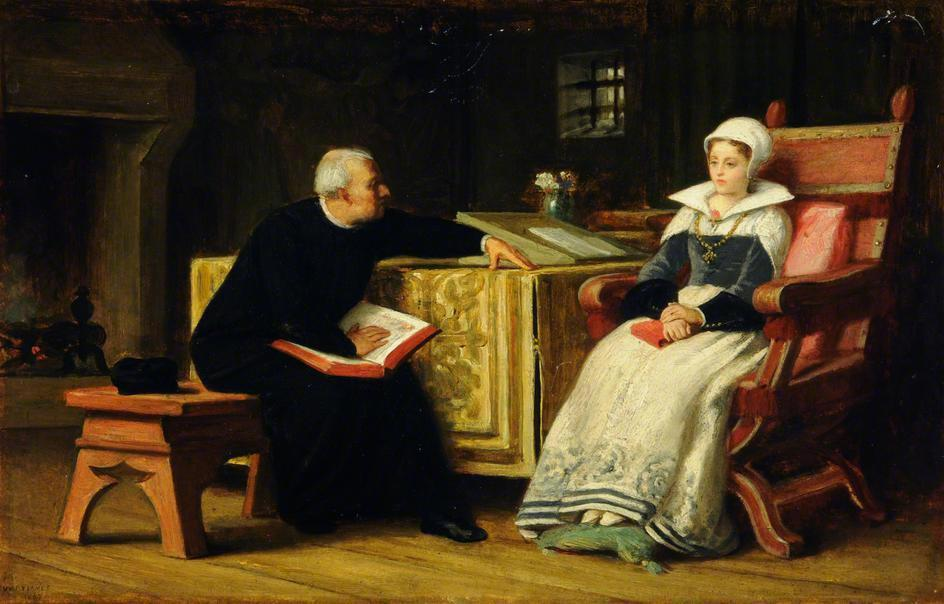
Lady Jane Gray in the Tower, by the Victorian painter William Frederick Yeames, ca 1860

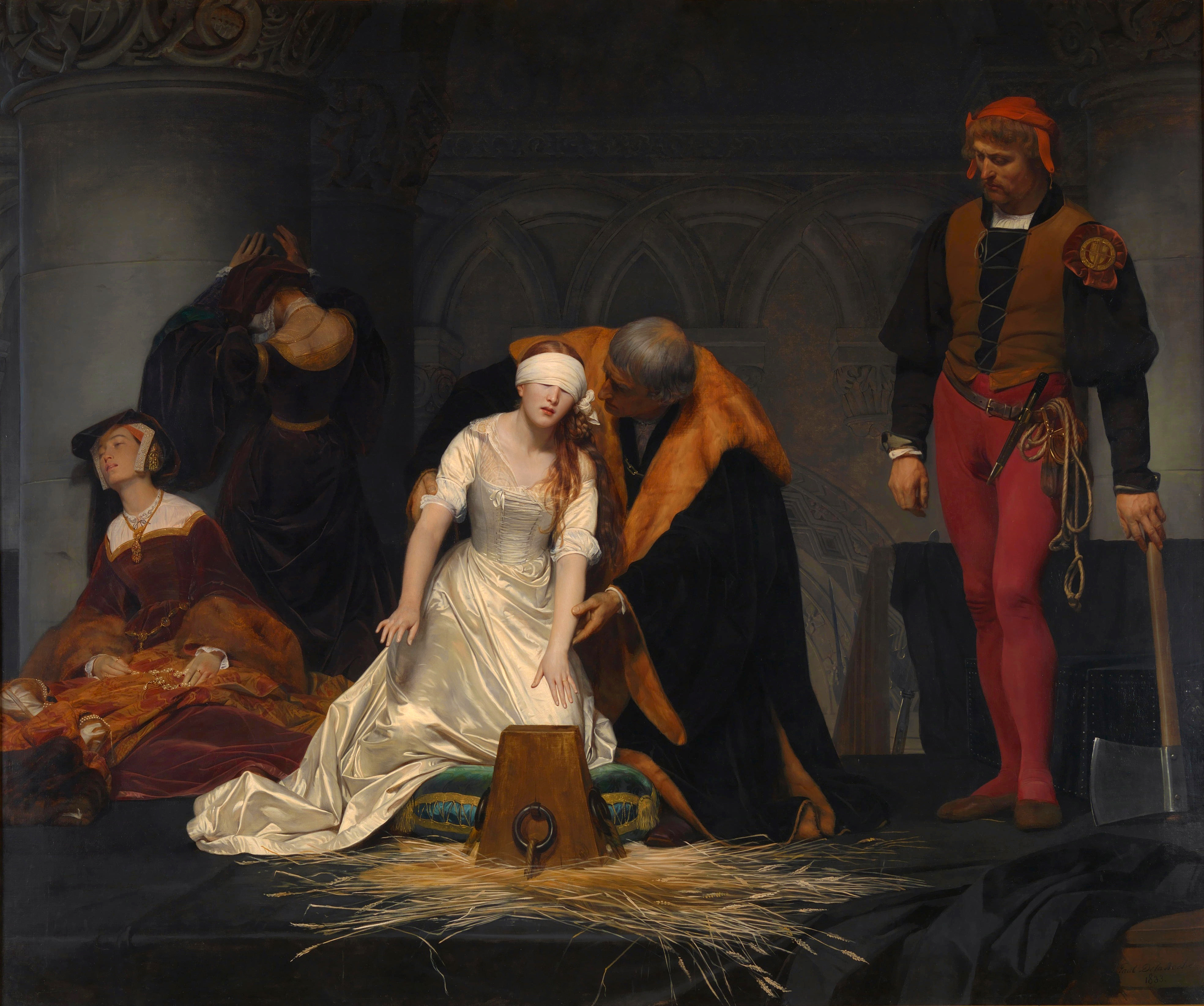
The Execution of Lady Jane Grey (1833) by French Romantic painter Paul Delaroche.

Jane Grey is the only English monarch in the last 500 years of whom no proven contemporary portrait survives. A painting in London's National Portrait Gallery was thought to be Jane for many years, but in 1996 it was confirmed to be of Catherine Parr. A portrait believed by some experts to be of Jane was discovered in a private home in 2005. Painted 40 to 50 years after Jane's death, the "Streatham portrait" (so called after the area of London in which it resided for decades) depicts a young woman dressed in a red gown, adorned with jewels and holding a prayer book. Historian and Tudor specialist David Starkey is sceptical, "It's an appallingly bad picture and there's absolutely no reason to suppose it's got anything to do with Lady Jane Grey." Another portrait, a miniature, was shown to the news media in 2007 by Starkey who stated that he was "90 per cent certain" that it is of Lady Jane Grey. This painting had been discovered at the Yale Center for British Art in the United States of America.

In 1833, Paul Delaroche created The Execution of Lady Jane Grey (le Supplice de Jeanne Grey), regarded as the most famous portrait of Jane, which depicts a clandestine execution in a dimly-lit room or dungeon. It is historically inaccurate in most respects and was influenced by the restoration of the French monarchy after the French Revolution. Jane is shown wearing a white garment resembling laced French undergarments, similar in colour to that worn by Marie Antoinette at her execution in 1793. Jane's actual execution took place in the open air of the Tower of London. Two years later, George Whiting Flagg chose to name his representation of a woman being blindfolded Lady Jane Grey Preparing for Execution rather than after Mary, Queen of Scots.

== In opera ==
Giovanna Gray, a tragic opera (tragedia lirica) in three acts based on Jane Grey's last days, was composed by Nicola Vaccai, with a libretto by Carlo Pepoli. The opera premiered on 23 February 1836 at La Scala, Milan, with Maria Malibran in the title role. It was a failure at its premiere, and the work never entered the repertoire. In reporting the poor reviews received by Giovanna Gray, the Revue et gazette musicale de Paris expressed astonishment that such an interesting and tragic subject had not been set by a composer capable of making it a dramatic success and suggested Meyerbeer, Rossini, or Halévy as possibilities.

Several minor composers did subsequently attempt operas about Jane Grey but with little success. Antonio d'Antoni composed a version in 1848 for the opera house in Trieste, but it was never performed. Timoteo Pasini's version, Giovanna Grey, set to a libretto by Giovanni Pennacchi, had a "triumphant" premiere at the Teatro Comunale in Ferrara in 1853 with Luigia Abbadia in the title role. It was performed again in Jesi at the Teatro Pergolesi the following year, but did not remain in the repertoire. Giuseppe Menghetti re-used Pepoli's libretto for his Giovanna Gray, which premiered in Trieste during the carnival season of 1859. Henri Büsser's Jane Grey premiered in 1891 and was soon forgotten.

Arnold Rosner tackled the subject with The Chronicle of Nine, composed in 1984 to a libretto based on the stage play The Chronicle of Queen Jane by Florence Stevenson. Excerpts of Rosner's work have been recorded. Its premiere was presented in Boston by Odyssey Opera and the Boston Modern Orchestra Project, conducted by Gil Rose. (Feb. 1, 2020). A complete recording of this production was released by BMOP Sound in 2021.

== In literature ==
- Jewel of the Greys (1972) (published in US as Destiny's Lady) by Maureen Peters with Jane Grey as main character.
- Karleen Bradford's 1986 novel, The Nine Days Queen, tells the story from Jane's perspective.
- Historian and novelist Alison Weir published a novel based on Lady Jane Grey's life, Innocent Traitor, in August 2006.
- Cornish poet Charles Causley penned a poem about her life simply entitled 'Lady Jane Grey' which appears in several of his collected volumes.
- Jane Grey appeared as a character in a Doctor Who short story entitled "The Nine-Day Queen", written by Matthew Jones for Dr Who: Decalog 2 (1995).
- Raven Queen by Pauline Francis, in which she is the central character. This novel, aimed at readers aged 12+ was published by Usborne Books on 12 February 2007, the 453rd anniversary of her execution.
- Jane appears as a character in at least three historical novels for young women: Mary, Bloody Mary and Beware, Princess Elizabeth, both by Carolyn Meyer, and Elizabeth I: Red Rose of the House of Tudor by Kathryn Lasky, part of the Royal Diaries literature series.
- Lady Jane Grey appears in Timeless Love by Judith O'Brien, a novel about a teenaged girl who is taken back in time to the reign of the young King Edward VI.
- The World of Lady Jane Grey is a historical fiction book by Gladys Malvern published in 1965.
- Ann Rinaldi's 2005 book, Nine Days a Queen, is a story told from Jane's perspective about her life from birth until her execution. In this, Jane Grey was reluctant to become queen, and believed that Mary would send a pardon just before her decapitation.
- Virgin and the Crab - Sketches, Fables and Mysteries from the Early Life of John Dee and Elizabeth Tudor, a novel by Robert Parry, 2009, places Jane as a significant character in many of the early chapters.
- In Lady in Waiting, a 2010 historical fiction novel written by Susan Meissner, antiques dealer Jane Lindsey discovers a ring inscribed with the name "Jane" that she believes belonged to Lady Jane Grey. The book alternates between modern-day New York and 16th century England as it relates the similar stories of modern Jane and Lady Jane Grey (the latter told through the view of her dressmaker, Lucy Day).
- In the 14th book in the Morganville Vampires series by Rachel Caine entitled Fall of Night (2013) a vampire character that goes by the name of Jesse is introduced. The series is a young adult supernatural urban fantasy series focusing on vampires. The character of Jesse is implied to be Lady Jane Grey. She is referred to as Lady Grey several times by another character, and as an explanation she states that she likes the fact that she was a queen although she only reigned for a period of nine days.
- Suzannah Dunn's 2015 book, The Lady of Misrule, is about a sixteen-year-old girl, Elizabeth Tilney, who volunteers to be Lady Jane Grey's companion while she is imprisoned in the Tower of London.
- My Lady Jane, a novel by Cynthia Hand, Brodi Ashton and Jodi Meadows, published 7 June 2016 by HarperTeen. This young adult novel tells the 'comical, fantastical, romantical, (not) entirely true' story of Lady Jane Grey.
- Jane appears as a point of view character in Phillipa Gregory's novel The Last Tudor published, 8 August 2017.

== In film, radio and television ==
There have been three film versions of Jane's life, in which she has been played by:

- Nina Vanna in the British silent film Lady Jane Grey; Or, The Court of Intrigue (1923)
- Nova Pilbeam in Tudor Rose (1936)
- Helena Bonham Carter in Lady Jane (1986)

In adaptations of The Prince and the Pauper she has been played by:

- Anne Howard in The Prince and the Pauper (1937)
- Jane Asher in The Prince and the Pauper (1962), part of the American TV series Disneyland
- Nádia Lippi in O Príncipe E o Mendigo (1972), a Brazilian TV adaptation
- Felicity Dean in Crossed Swords (1977)
- Sophia Myles in the British TV drama The Prince and the Pauper (1996)
- Perdita Weeks in the British TV drama The Prince and the Pauper (2000)

Jane was also played by Sarah Frampton in the BBC TV series Elizabeth R (1971).

In the BBC Radio 4 radio play The Nine Days Queen by Amanda Whittington, the adult Jane was played by Loo Brealey and the child Jane by Agnes Bateman.

Jane also appears in two episodes of The Sarah Jane Adventures, Lost in Time parts 1 and 2 which take place on her last day as queen. She is played by Amber Beattie.

Jane was played by Bella Ramsey in Starz's Becoming Elizabeth in 2022.

She is portrayed by Emily Bader in the 2024 Amazon Prime Video series My Lady Jane, based on the historical fantasy novel of the same name by Brodi Ashton, Cynthia Hand, and Jodi Meadows.

== Plays ==
Lady Jane Grey appears as a main character in Rosamund Gravelle's debut play Three Queens, and first played by Martha Crow. Set in 1554 the play is about a fictional encounter between Queen Mary I of England, Lady Jane Grey and Princess Elizabeth Tudor, brought together by their cousin, Cardinal Reginald Pole, the night before Lady Jane Grey is due to be executed.
