= Streatham portrait =

1590s oil painting

The Streatham Portrait called Lady Jane Grey
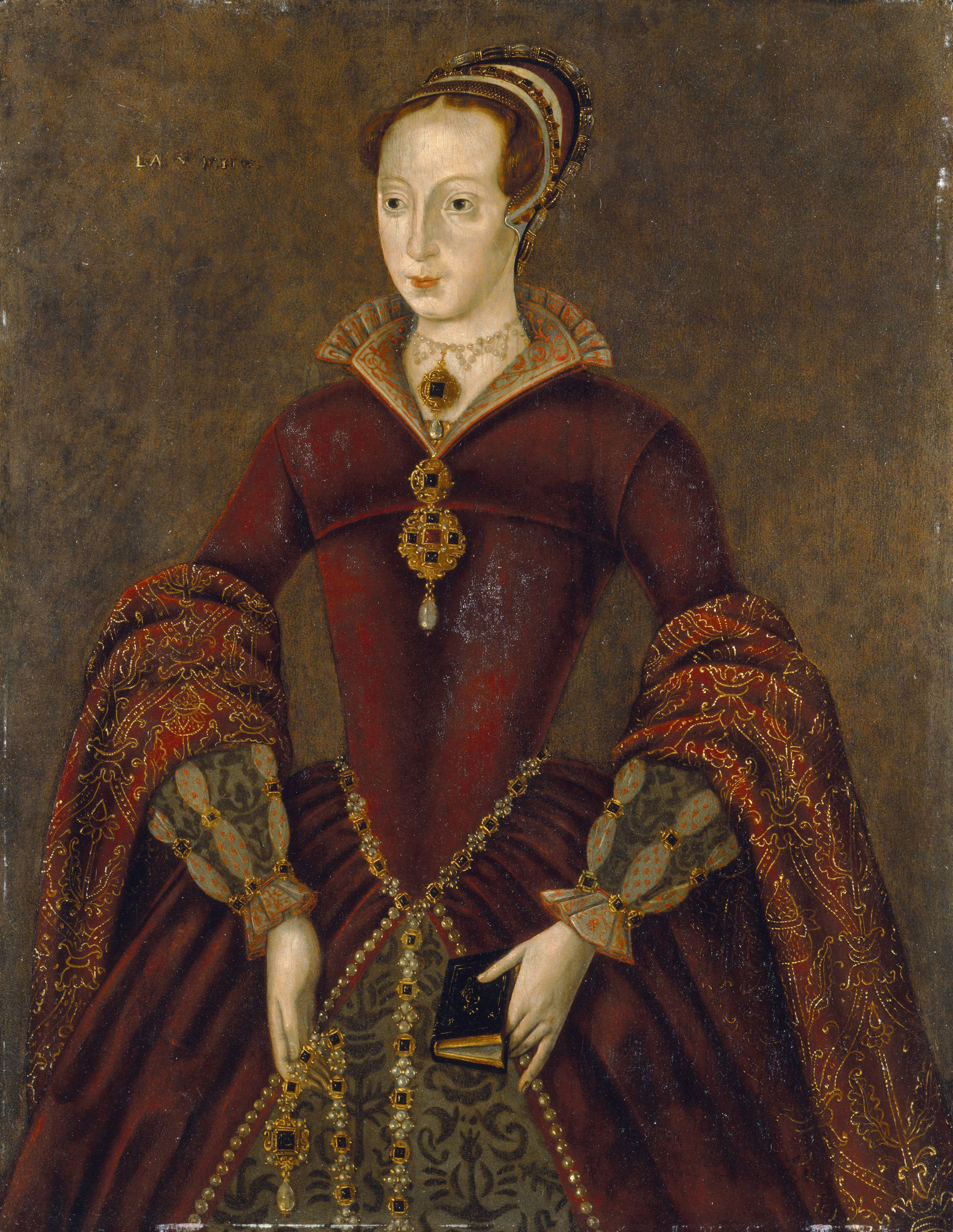
- Artist: Unknown
- Year: 1590s
- Medium: Oil on panel
- Dimensions: 85.6 cm × 60.3 cm (33.7 in × 23.7 in)
- Location: National Portrait Gallery; London, England
- Owner: National Portrait Gallery
- Accession: NPG 6804

The "Streatham" portrait is an oil painting on panel from the 1590s believed to be a later copy of an earlier portrait of the English noblewoman and disputed Queen of England, Lady Jane Grey. It shows a three-quarter-length depiction of a young woman in Tudor-period dress holding a prayer book, with the faded inscription "Lady Jayne" or "Lady Iayne" in the upper-left corner. It is in poor condition and damaged, as if it has been attacked. As of January 2015 the portrait is in Room 3 of the National Portrait Gallery in London.

The work is thought to have been completed as part of a set of paintings of Protestant martyrs. It was in the possession of a collector in Streatham, London, by the early 20th century. In December 2005 the portrait was examined by the art dealer Christopher Foley. He saw it as an accurate, though poorly executed, reproduction of a contemporary painting of Jane, had it verified and on that basis negotiated its sale. The work was acquired by the National Portrait Gallery in London for a rumoured £100,000. The historian David Starkey was highly critical of the sale and challenged Foley's identifications.

== Background ==
Lady Jane Grey was the great-granddaughter of King Henry VII through his youngest daughter, Mary, and first cousin once removed of King Edward VI. After Edward's death, a Protestant faction proclaimed her queen on 10 July 1553 over his Catholic half-sister, Mary. Nine days later, Mary successfully claimed the throne and Jane was imprisoned in the Tower of London on charges of high treason, along with her husband, Lord Guildford Dudley. Jane's trial was conducted in November, but her sentence of death was suspended. In February 1554, Jane's father, the Duke of Suffolk, who had been pardoned, participated in Wyatt's rebellion. On 12 February, Mary had Jane, then aged 16 or 17, and her husband beheaded; Jane's father suffered the same fate eleven days later.

Jane was a devout Protestant during the English Reformation, when the Church of England violently rejected the authority of the pope and the Roman Catholic Church. Known for her piety and education, she corresponded with Protestant leaders in Continental Europe, such as Heinrich Bullinger. A modest person who dressed plainly, her last words before her execution are reported as "Lord, into thy hands I commend my spirit!" Jane's execution by a Catholic queen made her into what the Oxford Dictionary of National Biography terms a "Protestant martyr", and by the end of the century Jane had become, in the words of the historian Eric Ives, "a Protestant icon". Depictions of Jane in the 16th and 17th centuries, such as in John Foxe's Actes and Monuments (1563), published after Protestant Elizabeth I took the throne, "presented [Jane] as primarily a figure in a national narrative about an elect nation possessed of a pure Protestant faith which had risen supreme over Catholic Europe".

Jane was long thought to be the only 16th-century English monarch without a surviving contemporary portrait; one was documented in a 1590 inventory, but is now considered lost. Some identified as her were later deemed to be of other sitters, such as one of Catherine Parr, the last of the six wives of Henry VIII, which was identified as Lady Jane Grey until 1996. (Note: The full-length portrait, attributed to Master John, had been acquired by the National Portrait Gallery in 1965. Though the portrait was traditionally held to be of Catherine Parr, later that year the gallery's director Sir Roy Strong relabelled it as being of Jane, based in part on comparisons with an engraving in Henry Holland's Herωologia Anglica (1620). In 1996, following the discovery of jewellery inventories which confirmed the brooch in the portrait had been owned by Parr, the gallery labelled the portrait as one of her (NPG, Catherine Parr; James 1996, pp. 20–24).) Other works, such as The Execution of Lady Jane Grey (1833) by Paul Delaroche, were painted years or centuries after her death. As a result, Cynthia Zarin of The New Yorker writes, "the blank where [Jane's] face should be has made it that much easier for succeeding generations to imprint their political and personal fantasies on her".

== Description ==
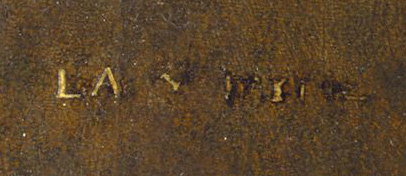
Detail, showing the inscription

The three-quarter-length portrait measures 85.6 cm × 60.3 cm (33.7 in × 23.7 in), and is painted with oil on Baltic oak. A faded inscription, reading "Lady Jayne" or "Lady Iayne", is in the upper-left corner, above the woman's shoulders. (Note: In the 16th century J and I were different shapes of the same letter. See J and History of the Latin alphabet for further discussion.) The sitter is described by art critic Charlotte Higgins as a slender and "demure, pious young woman", and has been tentatively identified as Lady Jane Grey. Ives notes a familial resemblance between the sitter and Grey's sisters, Catherine and Mary, which "may give conjectural support" to the identification of Grey.

The subject wears an opulent red gown with turned-back trumpet sleeves and a partlet with standing collar; the latter is embroidered with a fleur-de-lis pattern, the heraldic emblem of French royalty. The design on her underskirt shows a pattern variously identified as strawberries, gilliflowers, Scots thistles or pinks; the last of these was an emblem of the Grey family. A French hood on her head covers most of her red hair. She wears numerous pieces of jewellery, including a necklace finished with medallions and pearls; these indicate a person of high social and economic status, which is reinforced by the silk and velvet of her gown. The sitter is not, however, wearing a wedding ring, suggesting she was not yet married. Instead she is holding a prayer book. This type of costume was popular during the Tudor period, particularly in the 1550s, and the accuracy of its depiction has been used to advance the portrait's authenticity as a depiction of Jane Grey.

The independent historian J. Stephan Edwards writes, however, that the fleur-de-lis give him pause as, before June 1553, Jane "would have had no right to the French heraldic emblems" as she was not yet an heir to the throne. After the discovery of an inscribed portrait of Catherine Parr, in 2014 Edwards published a tentative identification of said painting as the original on which the Streatham portrait was based. He wrote that the Parr painting had been "adapted to 'become' Jane Grey in the absence of an accessible authentic portrait" in the Streatham portrait and similar, supporting this with an analysis of the similar styles of dress and the jewellery (including a necklace of festooned pearls).

Reception of the painting as a work of art has been predominantly negative. The historian David Starkey described it as "an appallingly bad picture", a sentiment which the art dealer Christopher Foley echoed. Tarnya Cooper of the National Portrait Gallery gave less sharp criticism, stating "it's a paint-by-number, labored copy", and "its value is as a historical document rather than a work of art". Zarin describes the painting as looking bleached in comparison with other portraits of monarchs, with "the flat face of a paper doll". Edwards writes "the quality might be described as naive, primitive, or even folk art".

== History ==
=== Production and early history ===
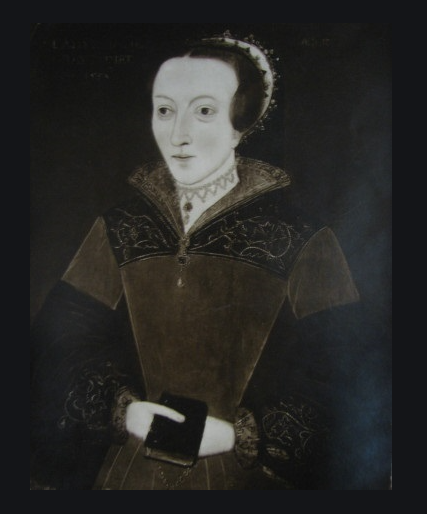
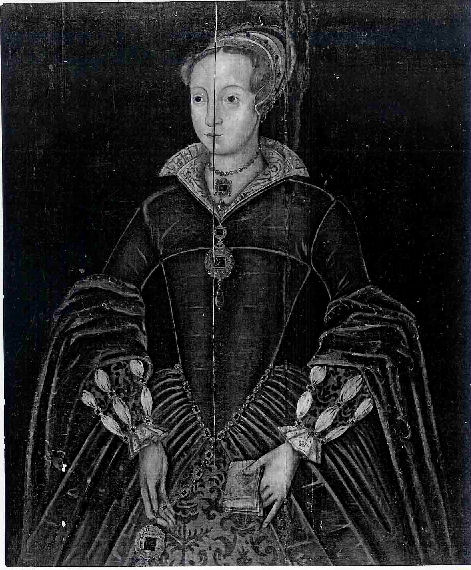
The "Norris" and "Houghton" portraits, also claimed to represent Jane Grey

The portrait is undated and unattributed. It is thought to have been completed in the 1590s, some forty years after Jane's death, probably as a copy of a 1580 woodcut of Jane. Dendrochronology dates the wood panel to c. 1593.

Another strikingly similar portrait, depicting a woman also credited as Jane – although the costume differs slightly – was once owned by Richard Monckton Milnes, 1st Baron Houghton, but is now in an undisclosed private collection. Christopher Foley traced this painting back to Francis Rodes of Barlborough Hall; the family owned a collection of portraits of Protestant heroes. Owing to similarities between the two works, Edwards suggests they are both copies of a lost original, perhaps completed by the same studio. A third copy, the Norris Portrait – once owned by the English costume designer Herbert Norris – is known through records, although its whereabouts are unknown.

The Streatham portrait may too have been part of a collection of Protestant martyr paintings. Damage to the painting's mouth and eyes suggests that it was vandalised, possibly by a Catholic partisan; as the seventeen scratches did not splinter the paint, this attack was probably not long after the portrait's completion. Owing to the painting's crudeness, Foley suggests that it was hurriedly completed for Jane's family from an original that "had to be destroyed because it would have been too dangerous to own once Mary became queen".

=== Discovery ===
The portrait was in the possession of a family in Streatham, London, by the 20th century. They had long believed the portrait was of Jane, and since 1923 had tried to convince others of its authenticity, without success. It was passed from generation to generation. In December 2005, Sir John Guinness informed Foley of the family and their portrait. Foley visited the owner, hoping "to go shut the fellow up", but upon seeing the work on an easel in their attic "knew it was right" for the period.

The identity of the sitter has been debated since the panel's discovery. Foley has identified at least four Jane Greys among the English nobility at the time of the portrait. However, owing to "the ages and marital status of the other candidates", Lady Jane Grey was the only viable choice; the others were too young, already married and using a different surname, or had lost their title. Starkey was more reserved, arguing "there isn't that over-the-top quality you get with royal portraits of the period, where the sitters look as though they've just come back from Asprey", and that there was no documentation of Jane owning the jewellery seen in the portrait.

After the discovery, Libby Sheldon of University College London conducted several tests to verify the painting's age, including spectroscopy and laser microscopy. The age of the inscription was taken into consideration, and found to be contemporaneous with the rest of the painting. Pigments, including a type of yellow pigment rarely found after 1600, were appropriate for the 16th century. Dendrochronological analysis later showed that the work was too late to be a life portrait of Jane, but did not rule out the possibility of reproduction.

=== National Portrait Gallery ===
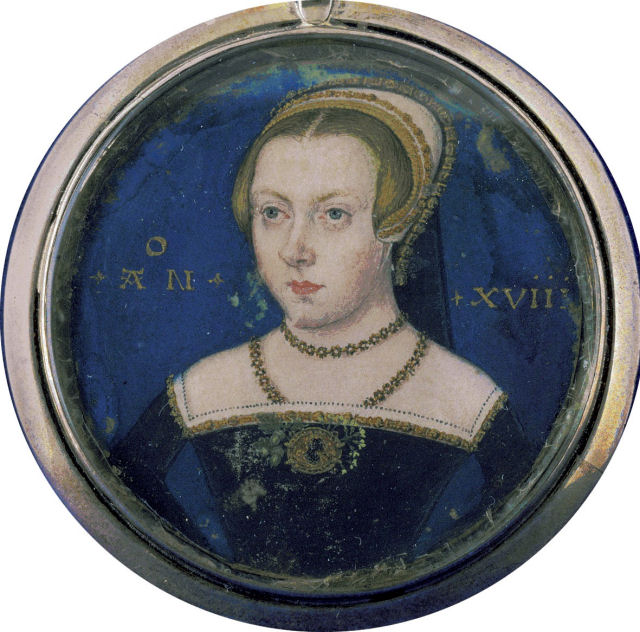
The miniature credited by Starkey as a portrait of Grey

The painting was purchased in 2006 by the National Portrait Gallery, London, with funds raised through their 150th anniversary gala, after more than nine months' consideration. The cost was rumoured to be more than £100,000, though Zarin gives a price of £95,000. The acquisition was criticised by Starkey, who said, "if the National Portrait Gallery has public money to burn, then so be it ... [the decision] depends on mere hearsay and tradition, and it is not good enough". Foley countered, "The evidence has been supported by people who know far more about the science of painting than David Starkey. I don't know what his problem is – is it because he didn't find it?"

Privately Starkey acted on behalf of the Philip Mould Gallery and examined another portrait thought to be Jane, held by the Yale Center for British Art. This 2-centimetre (0.79 in) miniature had been identified as Elizabeth I during a 1983 exhibition at the Victoria and Albert Museum; Starkey, however, was "90 per cent certain" it depicted Jane. After the March 2007 exhibition Lost Faces, when the miniature was displayed after a recent resurgence of interest in Jane, Foley published a lengthy letter challenging Starkey's judgement. He cited the sitter's brooch and emblem as indicative that she was not Jane Grey. (Note: Starkey and others wrote in the catalogue to the 2007 exhibition Lost Faces that the floristry in the miniature was suggestive of Jane Grey, and that the jewellery shown matched the two entries for a black head in a gold brooch included in the inventory of jewels presented to Jane when she was in the Tower. On the other hand, the contemporary description of Jane by Baptist Spinola stated that she had reddish brown eyes, freckles and nearly red hair; the eyes of the girl in the miniature are blue and her hair fair (Grosvenor 2007, Lost Faces, pp. 79–83). Edwards, as with Foley, argues that the portrait was not of Jane. He bases his argument on the floral symbolism and inconsistencies between the painting and an eye-witness account of Jane's appearance (Edwards 2012, The Yale Miniature).)

The Streatham portrait bears the accession number of NPG 6804 and is considered part of the gallery's primary collection. From January 2007 until early 2010 it was displayed in the Tudor Gallery. Beginning in early 2013, the painting was hung in Room 2 of the gallery's regional outpost at Montacute House in Somerset, part of an exhibition of Tudor-era portraits.

== See also ==
- Streatham Worthies, a circle of literary and cultural figures from Streatham commemorated by a series of portraits by Joshua Reynolds

== Works cited ==
- "Catherine Parr". National Portrait Gallery. Archived from the original on 24 February 2014.
- Edwards, J. Stephan (2015). A Queen of a New Invention – Portraits of Lady Jane Grey, England's 'Nine Days Queen'. Palm Springs, California: Old John Publishing. ISBN 978-0-9863873-0-2.
- Edwards, J. Stephan (20 August 2012). "The Houghton Hall Portrait". Some Grey Matter. Archived from the original on 24 February 2014.
- Edwards, J. Stephan (28 April 2012). "The Norris Portrait". Some Grey Matter. Archived from the original on 13 June 2014.
- Edwards, J. Stephan (22 May 2014). "The Streatham Portrait". Some Grey Matter. Archived from the original on 11 October 2014.
- Edwards, J. Stephan (20 August 2012). "The Yale Miniature Portrait". Some Grey Matter. Archived from the original on 20 February 2014.
- Grosvenor, Bendor, ed. (2007). Lost Faces: Identity and Discovery in Tudor Royal Portraiture. Catalogue of an exhibition held at the galleries of Philip Mould Ltd. Catalog entries by David Starkey, Philip Mould, Bendor Grosvenor, and Alasdair Hawkyard. London: Philip Mould. OCLC 122357300.
- Higgins, Charlotte (16 January 2006). "Is this the true face of Lady Jane?". The Guardian. Archived from the original on 28 February 2014.
- Higgins, Charlotte (11 November 2006). "A rare portrait of Lady Jane Grey? Or just an 'appallingly bad picture'?". The Guardian. Archived from the original on 23 February 2014.
- "Historic Figures – Lady Jane Grey (1537–1554)". BBC. Archived from the original on 4 February 2014.
- Ives, Eric (2009). Lady Jane Grey: A Tudor Mystery. Oxford: Wiley-Blackwell. ISBN 978-1-4051-9413-6.
- James, Susan E. (January 1996). "Lady Jane Grey or Queen Kateryn Parr?". The Burlington Magazine. 138 (1114): 20–24. (subscription required)
- "Lady Jane Dudley (née Grey)". National Portrait Gallery. Archived from the original on 20 June 2020.
- Mitchell, Rosemary A. (2007). "The Nine Lives of the Nine Day's Queen: From Religious Heroine to Romantic Victim". In Felber, Lynette (ed.). Clio's Daughters: British Women Making History, 1790–1899. Newark: University of Delaware Press. pp. 96–122. ISBN 978-0-87413-981-5.
- Nicolas, Nicholas Harris (1825). "Memoir of Lady Jane Grey". The Literary Remains of Lady Jane Grey: With a Memoir of Her Life. London: Harding, Triphook, and Lepard. pp. i–cxlviii. OCLC 10540094.
- Plowden, Alison. "Grey [married name Dudley], Lady Jane". Oxford Dictionary of National Biography. Archived from the original on 7 March 2014.
- Reynolds, Nigel (17 January 2006). "Has Lady Jane been hiding in Streatham?". The Guardian. Archived from the original on 23 March 2014.
- Reynolds, Nigel (5 March 2007). "The true beauty of Lady Jane Grey". The Guardian. Archived from the original on 25 March 2014.
- Zarin, Cynthia (15 October 2007). "Teen Queen: Looking for Lady Jane". The New Yorker. pp. 46–55. Archived from the original on 22 February 2014.
