= Innocent Traitor =

Book by Alison Weir about Lady Jane Grey

Innocent Traitor: A Novel of Lady Jane Grey
- UK hardback
- Author: Alison Weir
- Language: English
- Genre: Historical fiction, biographical fiction
- Published: 2006
- Publisher: Hutchinson; Ballantine Books
- Publication place: United Kingdom
- Pages: 402
- ISBN: 978-0-345-49485-6
- OCLC: 191728588
- LC Class: PR6123.E36 I66 2006
- Website: Penguin Random House; Alison Weir

Innocent Traitor: A Novel of Lady Jane Grey is a historical novel by Alison Weir, published in 2006. It is the story of Lady Jane Grey, who was Queen of England for nine days in 1553. Previously known for her non-fiction publications, Innocent Traitor was Weir's first work of fiction; she later spoke of its impact on her, saying she "learned so much from the editorial process about the writing and craft of fiction."

== Summary ==
This book tells the life of "The Nine Day Queen" through various characters' eyes, from Lady Jane to Queen Mary. This book tells of Jane's childhood and offers explanation to her conversion to the Protestant faith. It tells of her relationship to the future Queen Mary and Queen Elizabeth I along with her forced and unwanted marriage. It ends with her final days.

== Plot ==
The story starts with her birth in 1537. The daughter of Lady Frances Brandon and Henry Grey, Duke of Suffolk, Jane is seen as a burden by her parents, both of whom resent her for being a girl instead of a boy, and is regularly beaten by her mother.

Jane grows up close to her nurse, Mrs. Ellen and is highly educated, to the standards of a princess. After Henry VIII's death and Catherine Parr's marriage to Thomas Seymour, 1st Baron Seymour of Sudeley, Jane goes to live with the former queen and her husband to further her education while her elders plot her marriage to King Edward VI.

When it becomes clear that the young king will not live long, other plans are made for Jane. John Dudley, 1st Duke of Northumberland, gets the young Edward to proclaim Jane as his successor.

He does this by proclaiming his half sisters, Mary and Elizabeth, both bastards and not fit to take the throne. According to Edward's father's will, if all his children were to die without heirs, then the succession to the crown would follow the lineage of his late younger sister, Mary Tudor. Frances, the daughter of Mary, relinquishes her right to the crown in order for it to go to her eldest daughter, Jane, since she had no sons.

To secure his position Northumberland marries Jane off to Lord Guilford Dudley, his youngest son.

Jane is openly displeased with the man chosen to be her husband. On Edward's death, Northumberland and Henry Grey go forward with their plan and put Jane on the throne, proclaiming her to be the rightful heir to the throne.

At first, a reluctant Jane instead proclaims Mary the rightful queen, but is forced by her elders to take the throne as her own. There is little support for her claim, though. Even many Protestant nobles, whose support had been counted on, rally to Mary.

When Mary rides into town proclaiming herself the rightful queen, Jane puts up no fight and is happy to relinquish the title to her cousin. Thinking Mary will be kind to her, Jane is not worried, even though she is confined to the Tower of London; she had spent her brief "reign" there, and the main change is that she is no longer living in the royal apartments.

Mary's fiancé, Philip II of Spain, pressures Mary to rid England of the usurper Jane after yet another attempt by Jane's father to overthrow Mary and put Jane back on the throne. Mary reluctantly acquiesces for fear of displeasing her husband-to-be.

Mary signs a warrant for execution of both Lady Jane Grey and her husband, Guilford Dudley. She is sympathetic towards Jane, offering her a few more days before the execution, while promising to spare her life, if she converts from the Protestant faith to the Catholic faith. Stubborn in her religious ways, Jane refuses and pays the price. On 12 February 1554 Jane is taken to the Tower Green, where she faces the scaffold and dies a traitor's death. Even the executioner feels sorry for her.

== Reception ==
The Historical Novel Society called Innocent Traitor a "riveting, richly descriptive novel." Publishers Weekly criticized the book's multiple narrators as "unwieldy" but praised Weir's "deft[ness]... describing Tudor food, manners, clothing, pastimes... and marital politics," and Kirkus Reviews called it an "affecting portrayal."
