= The Execution of Lady Jane Grey =

Painting by Paul Delaroche

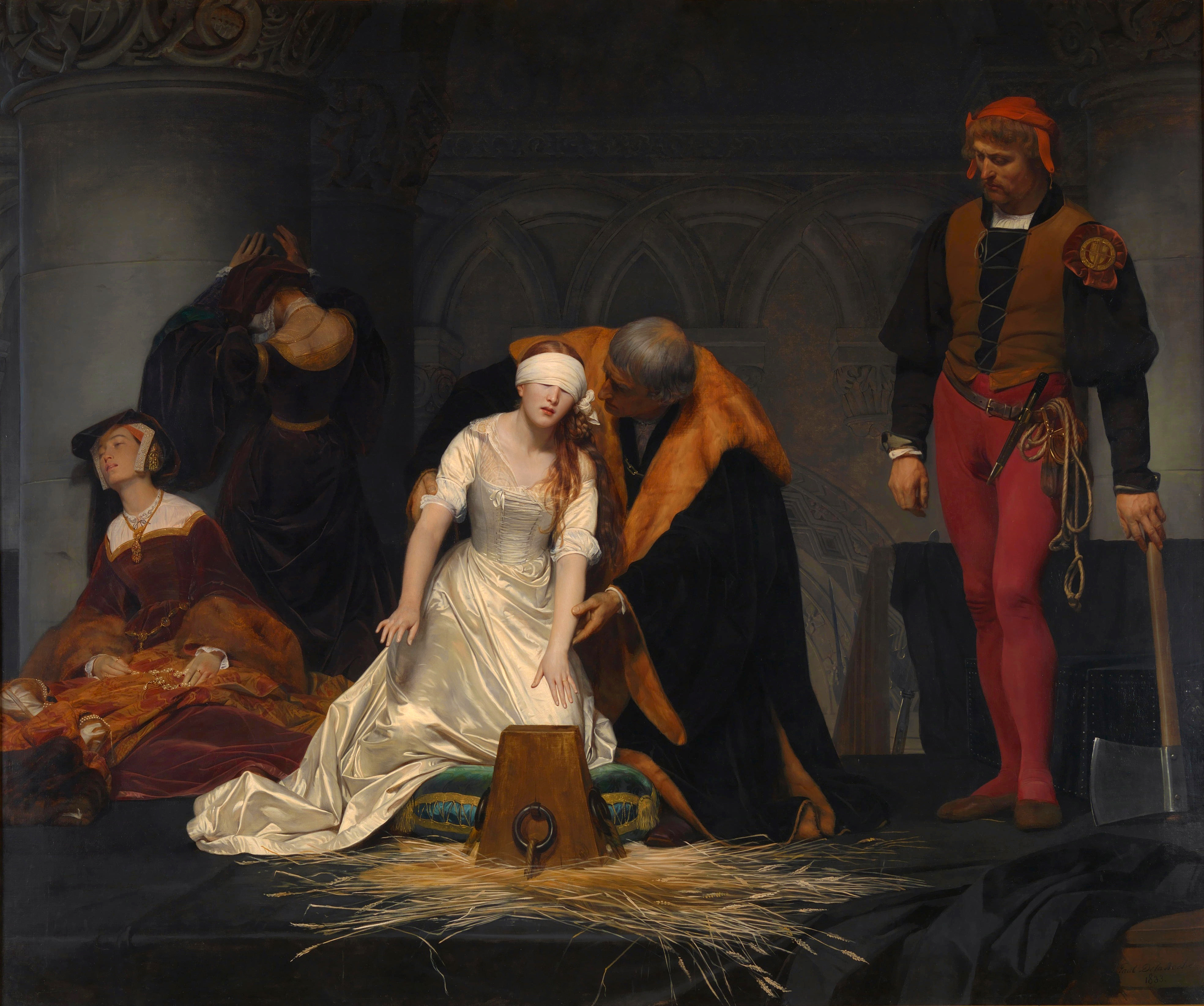
- Artist: Paul Delaroche
- Year: 1833
- Medium: Oil on canvas
- Dimensions: 246 cm × 297 cm (97 in × 117 in)
- Location: National Gallery, London

The Execution of Lady Jane Grey is an oil painting by Paul Delaroche, completed in 1833, which is now in the National Gallery in London. It was enormously popular in the decades after it was painted, but in the 20th century realist historical paintings fell from critical favour and it was kept in storage for many decades, for much of which it was thought lost. Restored and displayed again since 1975, it immediately became a highly popular work once again, especially with younger visitors.

The painting interprets the moments preceding the death of Lady Jane Grey, who on 10 July 1553 had been proclaimed Queen of England, only to be deposed nine days later and executed on 12 February 1554. Jane is sometimes referred to as the "Nine Days' Queen" due to the brevity of her reign.

== Subject ==
Lady Jane Grey was a great-granddaughter of Henry VII of England and first cousin once removed to his grandson, the short-lived Edward VI. After Edward's death she was proclaimed queen, being given precedence over Henry VIII's daughters, Mary and Elizabeth. Two weeks after the death of her brother, Mary, who had the support of the English people, claimed the throne, which Jane relinquished, having reigned for only nine days. Jane, her husband Lord Guilford Dudley, and her father, were imprisoned in the Tower of London on charges of high treason. Jane's trial was conducted in November, but the death penalty handed to her was temporarily suspended. In February 1554, Jane's father, who had been released, was one of the rebel leaders in Wyatt's rebellion. On Friday 12 February, Mary had Jane, then aged 17, and her husband beheaded. Her father's beheading followed eleven days later.

== Treatment ==
In 1833 Delaroche painted the subject of Lady Jane's execution, nearly 300 years after the event, drawing upon contemporary historical sources to help him portray it accurately. Delaroche had built his reputation in the Paris salon with large, realistic portrayals of famous events from the previous few centuries. As with many artists of the time that specialized in the painting of historical narratives, there are aspects of the scene which were invented to heighten the symbolism and drama.

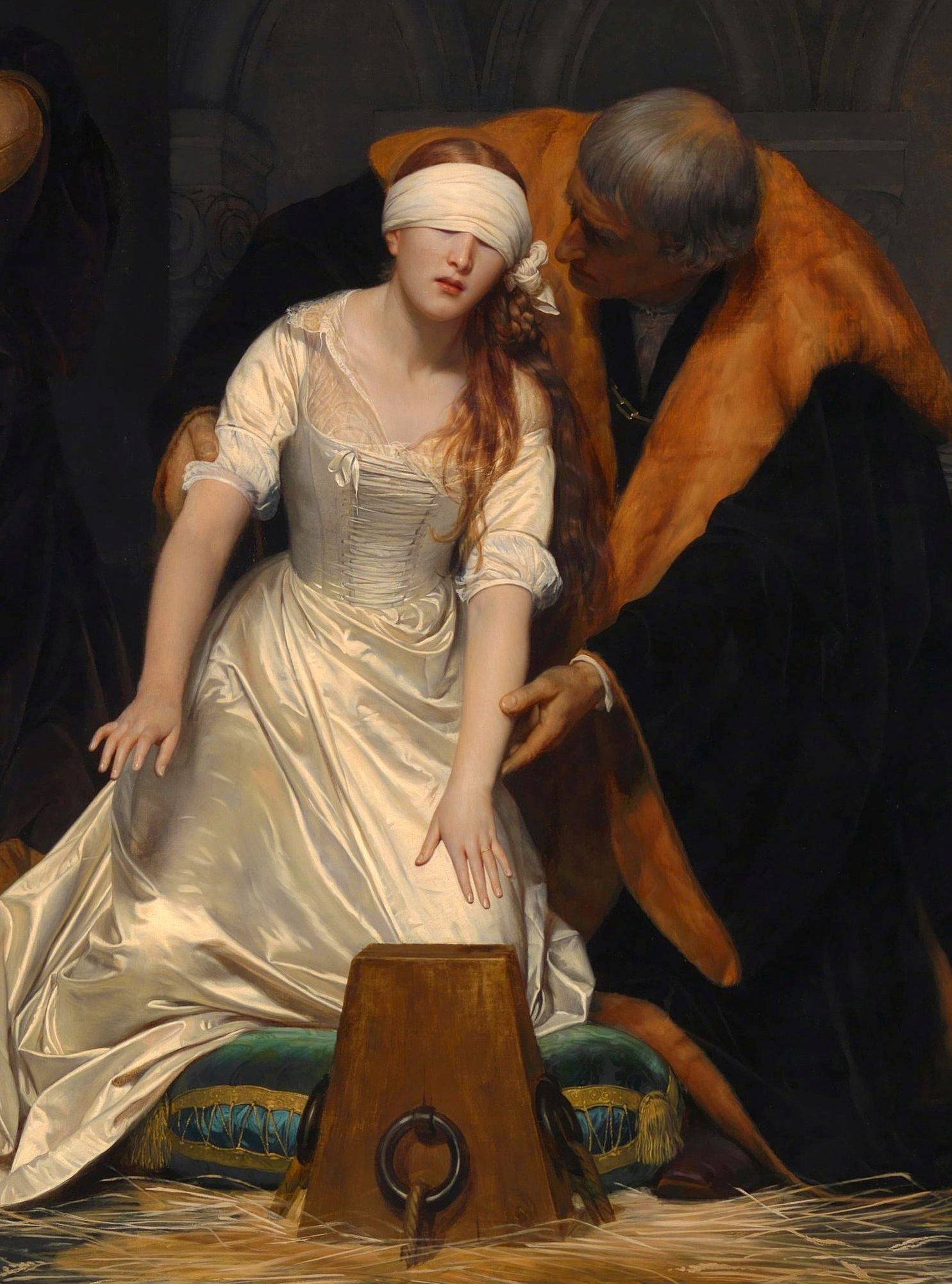
Detail of Lady Jane Grey

The painting depicts the moment that Jane, blindfolded, is being assisted to lay her head upon the block for the executioner. Her outstretched hand reaches uncertainly down to find the block. She is being assisted by a man who is identified as John Brydges, 1st Baron Chandos. Chandos was a Lieutenant of the Tower at the time of Jane's execution. While imprisoned in the Tower, Jane was attended by ladies in waiting, one of whom was the nursemaid of her infancy. Two ladies in waiting are depicted in the painting, showing their grief at the event which is about to take place.

The execution was conducted in the open air, in a part of the grounds of the Tower of London that is known as Tower Green, and where Henry VIII's wives Anne Boleyn and Catherine Howard had been executed. Delaroche instead chose a darker environment to heighten the psychological weight of the dark subject matter, much as a scenographer would for a stage play.

In the picture, the execution is taking place upon a raised wooden platform similar to those on which executions of royalty and nobility had taken place in the French Revolution. The edge of this platform can be seen, draped with a black cloth, across the foreground of the picture. At the rear of the pictorial space the handrail of stairs descends, and the tops of two weapons indicate the presence of guards. Delaroche includes a detail about the Tower of London that associates it with its founder William the Conqueror. In the painting, two stout Norman columns with cushion capitals, a blind arcade, and a large chevroned arch create a backdrop indicative of the antiquity of the site. His choice of this building from several within the Tower of London that span the reigns of many monarchs seems intentional and may be for stylistic or symbolic reasons, since the execution actually took place outside the Chapel of St Peter ad Vincula, which was constructed not at the time of William the Conqueror but by order of Henry VIII nearly 500 years later.

It is difficult to ascertain by the setting and the lighting whether it was the artist's intention to create the impression that the scene was taking place outside a building or in an interior. The architectural features shown can occur on both interiors and exteriors of Norman buildings. The darkness of the upper part of the painting is suggestive of an interior, while the light that bathes the central figure is daylight. Ghislaine Kenyon, head of education at the National Gallery, commented on the sense of foreboding that the darkness was intended to create.

The intensely dark areas that occupy a large proportion of the painting's surface play a big part in the drama. Not only is the shadow of the upper section of the painting black, so also are the cloth that covers the platform, the dress of one of the ladies, the cloak of Baron Chandos, and the sleeves of the executioner. Three garments form accents of warm colour, the brown dress of one of the ladies, the orange fur of the Lieutenant's collar, and the blood-red hose of the executioner. The colour of Lady Jane's red-gold hair is picked up in the straw beneath the block. Against the darkness, Lady Jane, with her pallid flesh, her white bodice, and her satin petticoat, makes a splash of light. The artist seizes the eye of the viewer by placing the most intense patches of white on Jane's blindfold and the area of her skirt just between her outstretched hand and the sharply defined edge of the block.

Delaroche has used many small details in telling the story and increasing the dramatic and emotive quality of the painting. The figures play their parts like actors through the expressions and gestures of grief and despair of the two women, the almost fatherly tenderness with which the Lieutenant of the Tower assists the blindfolded girl to take up the required position, and the displeasure in the face of the executioner at the task that confronts him. Other narrative details include the rings on the block with the ropes which lash it steady to the floor, and the well-honed but well-worn edge to the axe. Kenyon points out that the clean straw, commonly placed near the site of an execution to soak up blood, and the white dress were devices used by the artist to make the observer suppose what would happen to them next.

== Provenance ==
The painting was made after the July Revolution of 1830 which deposed Charles X of France, the last of the French Bourbon monarchs. Charles X's brother was Louis XVI whose throne was usurped and who was executed during the French Revolution. It is also redolent of the execution of Marie Antoinette. Unsurprisingly, the emotive painting caused something of a sensation. The painting was highly popular in the Paris salon when it was first exhibited there at the Salon of 1834.

It was originally bought by Anatoly Nikolaievich Demidov, 1st Prince of San Donato as part of the Demidov collection. From there it passed in 1870 to Henry Eaton, 1st Baron Cheylesmore after whose death in 1891 it realised £1,575 (lot 78) at his sale at Christie's the next year, less than a quarter of the price of the star of the sale, The Monarch of the Glen (lot 42, £7,245) by Sir Edwin Landseer, one of the most popular paintings of the age. It was bought by his son, William Eaton, 2nd Baron Cheylesmore, who bequeathed it to the National Gallery, London in 1902, with four other paintings, including two other Landseers from his father's collection.

The painting was thought to have been destroyed in the disastrous flooding of the Tate Gallery during the 1928 Thames flood, and it was only rediscovered in 1973 by Tate Gallery curator Christopher Johnstone. He was writing a book on the British painter John Martin and examining the damaged canvases remaining from the flood in search of a missing painting by the artist. He found Martin's The Destruction of Pompeii and Herculaneum, albeit in very poor condition, rolled inside the Delaroche painting. The latter was in much better condition and was transferred to the National Gallery, where it should have gone when the national art collections were rationalised following the establishment of the Tate. This painting is also directly inspired by David Hume's 'Mary, Queen of Scots at the execution block' from 1795.

== See also ==
- Lady Jane Grey Preparing for Execution, 1835 oil painting by the American artist George Whiting Flagg
