= Lady Jane Grey =

Disputed Queen of England and Ireland in 1553

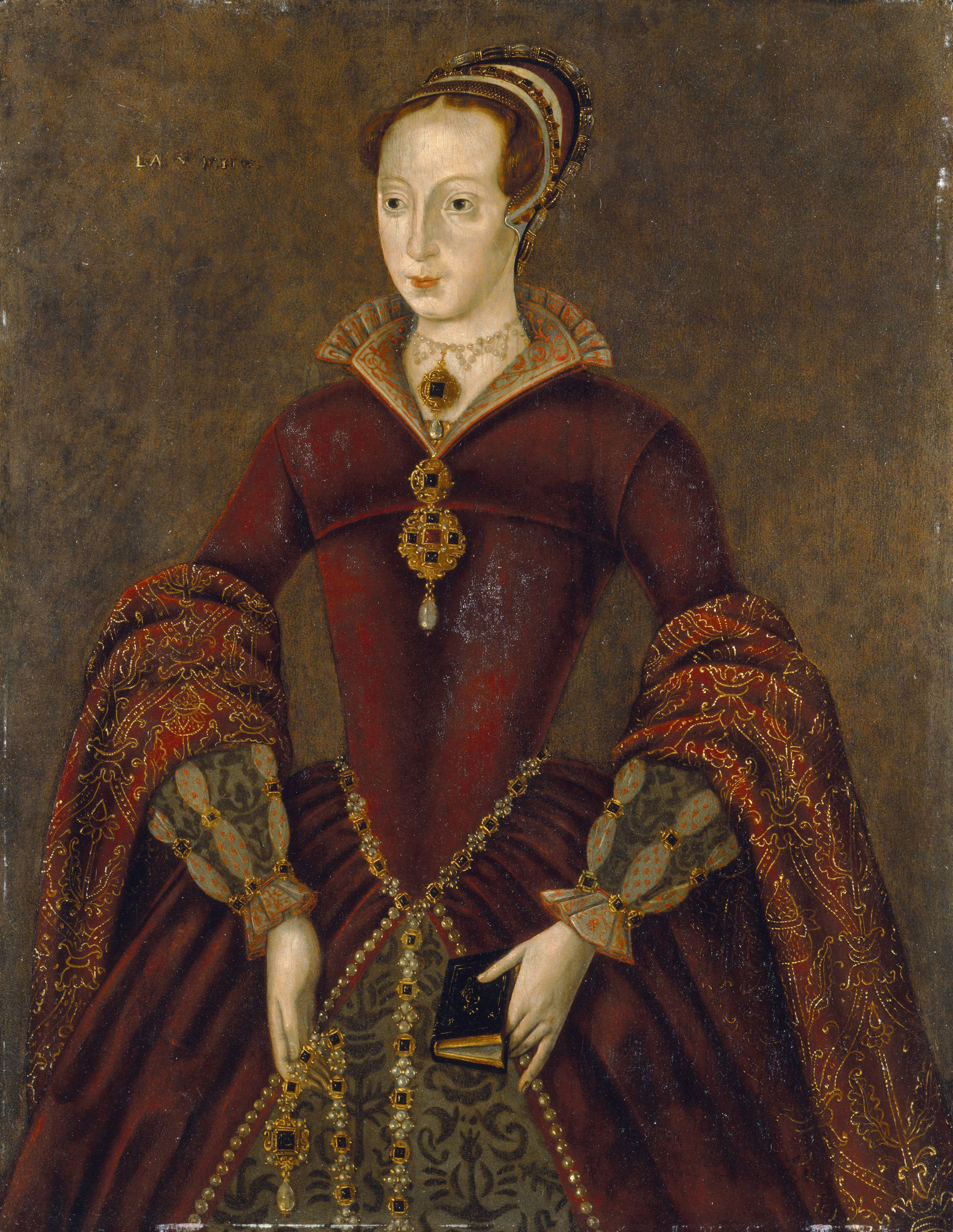
- The Streatham portrait, believed to be based on a contemporary woodcut

Queen of England and Ireland
- Reign: 10 July 1553 – 19 July 1553
- Predecessor: Edward VI
- Successor: Mary I
- Born: 1536 or 1537; England
- Died: 12 February 1554 (aged 16 or 17); Tower of London, England
- Cause of death: Beheading (execution)
- Burial: Church of St Peter ad Vincula, Tower of London (unconfirmed)
- Spouse: Lord Guildford Dudley (m. 1553; died 1554)
- House: Grey
- Father: Henry Grey, 1st Duke of Suffolk
- Mother: Lady Frances Brandon
- Religion: Protestantism

Lady Jane Grey (1536/1537 – 12 February 1554), also known as Lady Jane Dudley after her marriage, and nicknamed the "Nine Days Queen", was an English noblewoman who was proclaimed Queen of England and Ireland on 10 July 1553 and reigned until she was deposed by the Privy Council of England, which proclaimed her cousin Mary I as the new queen on 19 July. Jane was later beheaded for high treason.

Jane was the great-granddaughter of Henry VII (through his youngest surviving daughter, Mary Tudor), the grandniece of Henry VIII, and the first cousin once removed of Edward VI, Mary I, and Elizabeth I. Under the will of Henry VIII, Jane was in line to the throne after her cousins. She had a humanist education and a reputation as one of the most learned young women of her day. In May 1553, she was married to Lord Guildford Dudley, a younger son of Edward VI's chief minister, John Dudley, Duke of Northumberland. In June, the dying Edward VI wrote his will, nominating Jane and her male heirs as successors to the Crown, in part because his half-sister Mary was Catholic, whereas Jane was a committed Protestant and would support the reformed Church of England, whose foundation Edward laid. The will removed both of his half-sisters, Mary and Elizabeth, from the line of succession because of their illegitimacy, subverting their lawful claims under the Third Succession Act. Through the Duke of Northumberland, Edward's letters patent in favour of Jane were signed by the entire privy council, bishops, and other notables.

After Edward's death, Jane was proclaimed queen on 10 July 1553 and awaited coronation in the Tower of London. Support for Mary grew rapidly, and most of Jane's supporters abandoned her. The Privy Council suddenly changed sides and proclaimed Mary as queen on 19 July, deposing Jane. Her primary supporter, her father-in-law, the Duke of Northumberland, was accused of treason and executed less than a month later. Jane was held prisoner in the Tower, and in November 1553, she was also convicted of treason, which carried a sentence of death.

Mary initially spared her life, but Jane soon became viewed as a threat to the Crown when her father, Henry Grey, 1st Duke of Suffolk, became involved with Wyatt's rebellion against Mary's intention to marry Philip of Spain. Jane and her husband were both executed by beheading on 12 February 1554 at the Tower of London. At the time of her execution, Jane was either 16 or 17 years old.

== Early life and education ==
Lady Jane Grey was the eldest daughter of Henry Grey, Duke of Suffolk, and Frances Brandon. The traditional view is that she was born at Bradgate House, Bradgate Park, in Leicestershire in October 1537, but more recent research indicates that she was born somewhat earlier, possibly in London, sometime before May 1537 or between May 1536 and February 1537. This would coincide with the fact that she was noted as being in her seventeenth year at the time of her execution. Frances was the elder daughter of Henry VIII's younger sister, Mary. Jane had two younger sisters: Lady Katherine and Lady Mary. Through their mother, the three sisters were great-granddaughters of Henry VII; grandnieces of Henry VIII; and first cousins once removed of the future Edward VI, Mary I and Elizabeth I. On her father's side, Jane and her sisters were granddaughters of Thomas Grey, 2nd Marquess of Dorset, and his second wife Margaret Wotton. On her paternal grandfather's side, Jane and her sisters were also descended from Elizabeth Woodville, wife of King Edward IV, by her first marriage to Sir John Grey of Groby.

Jane received a humanist education from John Aylmer, speaking Latin and Greek from an early age, also studying Hebrew with Aylmer and Italian with Michelangelo Florio. She was particularly fond, throughout her life, of writing letters in Latin and Greek. Through the influence of her father and her tutors, she became a committed Protestant and also corresponded with the Zürich reformer Heinrich Bullinger. Jane had a reputation as one of the most learned young women of her day.

She preferred academic studies to activities such as hunting parties and allegedly regarded her strict upbringing, which was typical of the time, as harsh. To the visiting scholar Roger Ascham, who found her reading Plato, she is said to have complained:

For when I am in the presence either of father or mother, whether I speak, keep silence, sit, stand or go, eat, drink, be merry or sad, be sewing, playing, dancing, or doing anything else, I must do it as it were in such weight, measure and number, even so perfectly as God made the world; or else I am so sharply taunted, so cruelly threatened, yea presently sometimes with pinches, nips and bobs and other ways (which I will not name for the honour I bear them) ... that I think myself in hell.

Around February 1547, Jane was sent to live in the household of Edward VI's uncle, Thomas Seymour, 1st Baron Seymour of Sudeley (brother of the late queen Jane Seymour), who soon married Henry VIII's widow, Catherine Parr. After moving there, Jane was able to receive educational opportunities available in court circles. Jane lived with the couple at Sudeley Castle in Gloucestershire as an attendant to Catherine until Catherine died in childbirth in September 1548. About 11 years old at the time, Jane was chief mourner at Catherine's funeral. After Thomas Seymour's arrest for treason, Jane returned to Bradgate and continued her studies.

== Contracts for marriage ==
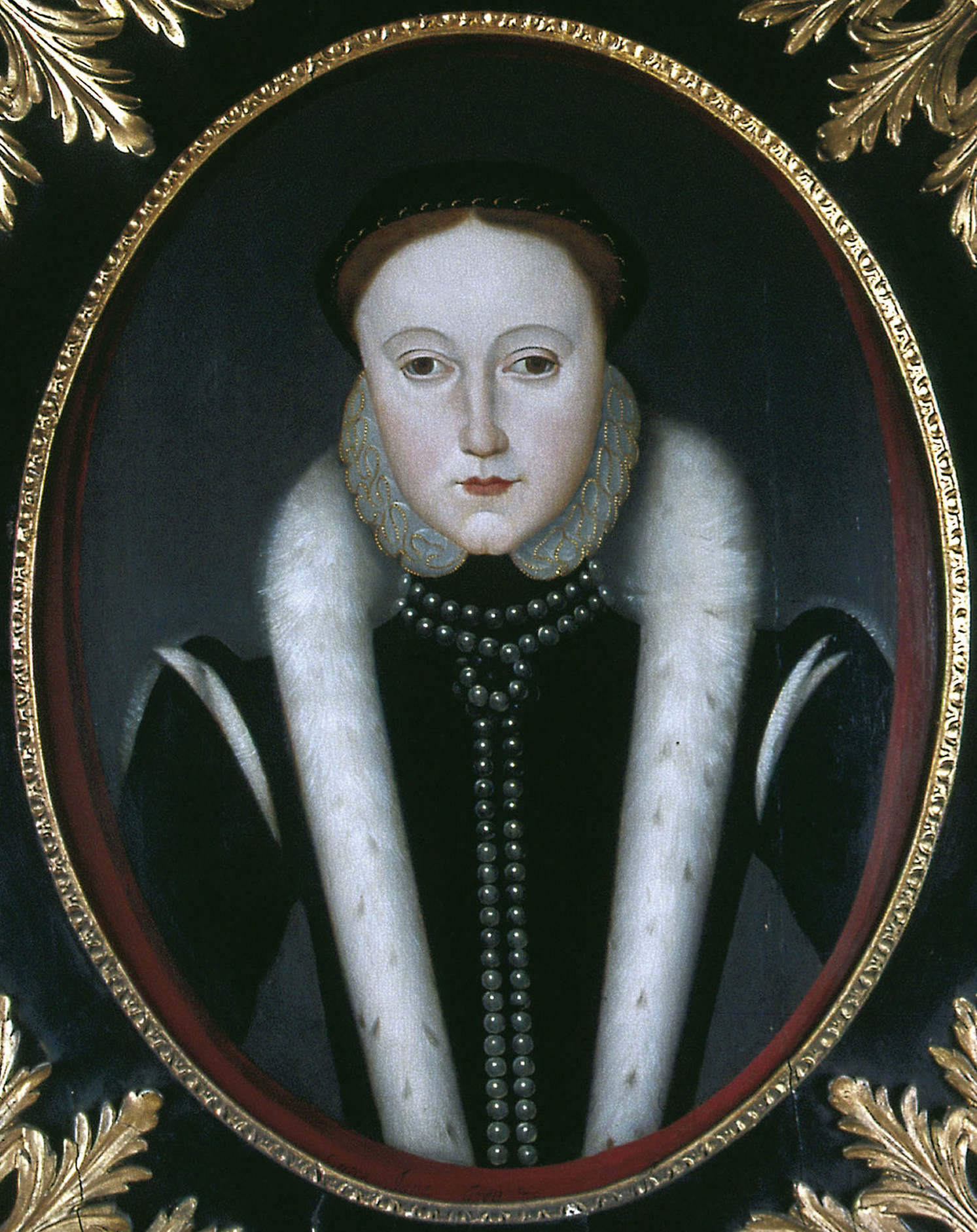
17th-century portrait of a lady in the collection of Audley End House, labelled as Jane Grey, copy of the original at Syon House. Based on a portrait type identified as Lady Katherine Grey or Elizabeth I, it is believed that the Syon Portrait was created by William Seymour, 2nd Duke of Somerset, with the help of his grandfather, Lady Katherine Grey's widower, who had also known Jane Grey, tweaking the portrait type into a genuine resemblance of her.

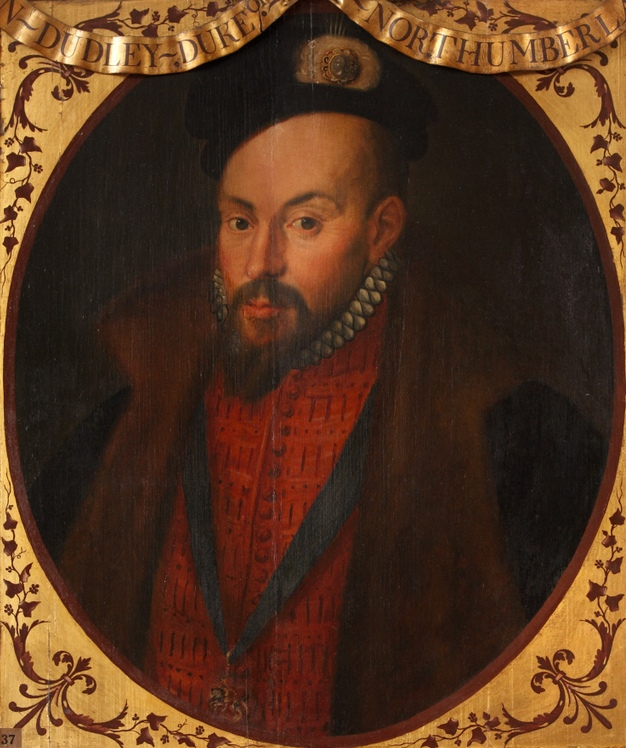
John Dudley, 1st Duke of Northumberland, Jane's father-in-law and strongman, led much of his daughter-in-law's brief reign.

Lady Jane acted as chief mourner at Catherine Parr's funeral. Thomas Seymour showed continued interest in keeping her in his household, and she returned there for about two months before he was arrested at the end of 1548. Seymour's brother, the Lord Protector, Edward Seymour, 1st Duke of Somerset, felt threatened by Thomas' popularity with the young King Edward. Among other things, Thomas Seymour was charged with proposing Jane as a bride for the king.

In the course of Thomas Seymour's following attainder and execution, Jane's father was lucky to stay largely out of trouble. After his fourth interrogation by the Privy Council, he proposed his daughter Jane as a bride for the Protector's eldest son, Lord Hertford. Nothing came of this, however, and Jane was not engaged until 25 May 1553, her bridegroom being Lord Guildford Dudley, a younger son of John Dudley, 1st Duke of Northumberland. The Duke, Lord President of the Privy Council from late 1549, was then the most powerful man in the country. On 25 May 1553, the couple were married at Durham House in a triple wedding, in which Jane's sister Katherine was matched with the heir of the Earl of Pembroke, Lord Herbert, and another Katherine, Lord Guildford's sister, with Henry Hastings, the heir of the Earl of Huntingdon.

== Claim to the throne and accession ==
=== Illness and death of Edward VI ===
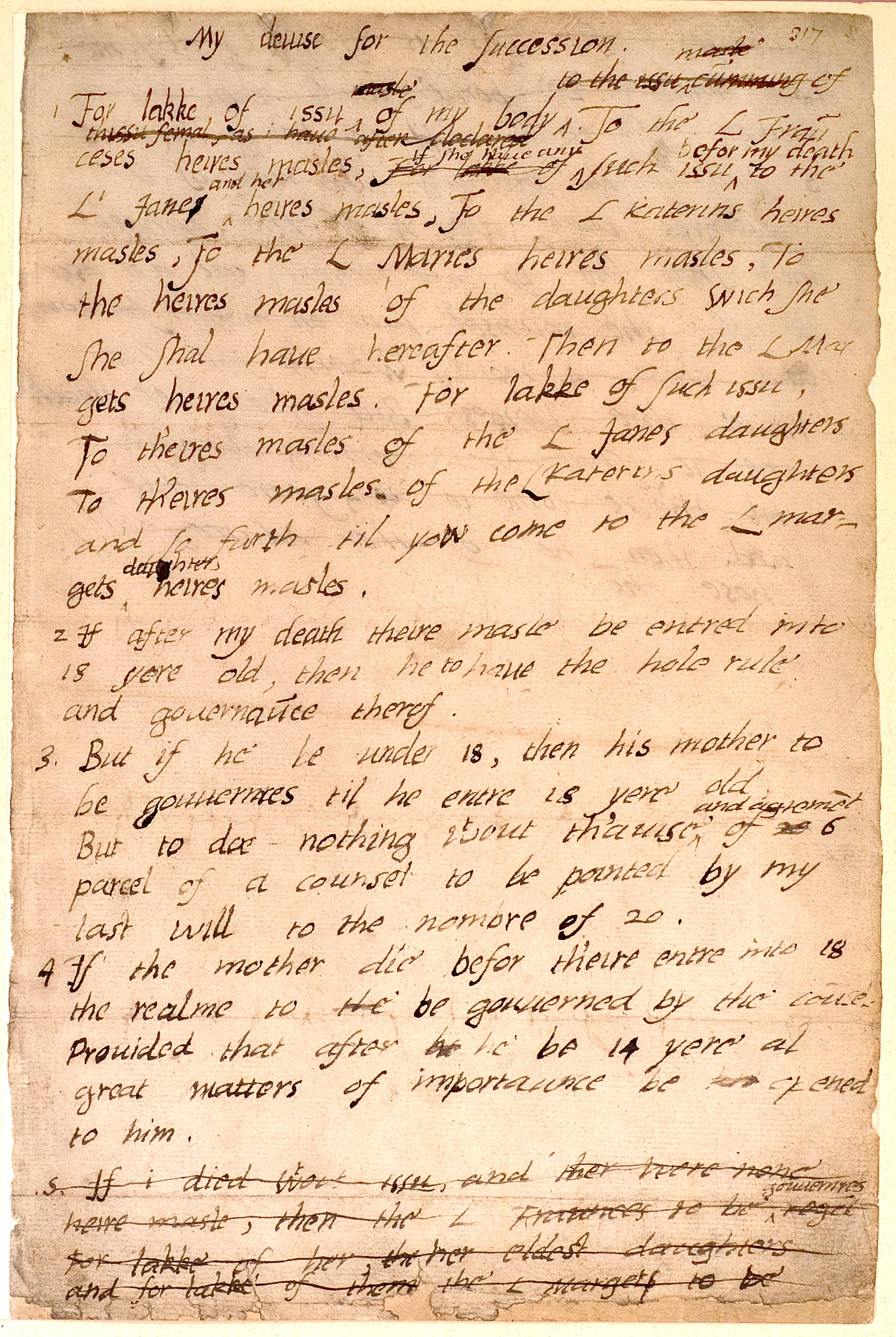
Edward VI's "devise for the Succession". The draft will was the basis for letters patent, which declared Jane Grey successor to the Crown. Edward's autograph shows his alteration of his text, from "L Janes heires masles" to "L Jane and her heires masles". Inner Temple Library, London.

Henry VIII had three children: Mary, who was raised Roman Catholic, and Elizabeth and Edward (the last from the King's third marriage to Jane Seymour, who died in 1537 after complications arising from the pregnancy and birth of Edward), both of whom were raised as Protestant. Following the annulment of his marriage to his first wife, Catherine of Aragon, Mary's mother, in 1533 and the beheading of his second wife, Anne Boleyn, Elizabeth's mother, in 1536, Henry rewrote the Act of Succession twice, declaring his daughters illegitimate. Although Jane Seymour managed to reconcile Henry briefly with his daughters, the monarch's formal reconciliation with them would come only in 1543, at the urging of his sixth and last wife, Catherine Parr. The princesses were reinstated in the line of succession in the Final Act of 1544, although they were still regarded as illegitimate. Furthermore, this Act authorised Henry VIII to alter the succession by his will. Henry's will reinforced the succession of his three children and then declared that, should none of them leave descendants, the throne would pass to heirs of his younger sister, Mary, which included Jane. For reasons still unknown, Henry excluded his niece and Jane's mother, Lady Frances Brandon, from the succession, and also bypassed the claims of the descendants of his elder sister, Margaret, who had married into the Scottish royal house and nobility.

In February 1553 Edward VI fell ill. Although he briefly recovered, in May he suffered a relapse again, and by early June his health had seriously deteriorated to the point that royal doctors informed Dudley and other noblemen close to Edward that he had only a few weeks to live. At the time, Edward's heir presumptive was his Catholic half-sister, Mary. Edward, in a draft will ("My devise for the Succession") composed earlier in 1553, had first restricted the succession to (non-existent) male descendants of Jane's mother and her daughters, before he named his Protestant cousin "Lady Jane and her heirs male" as his successors, probably in June 1553. Aware of his impending death and still with a clear conscience, Edward, guided primarily by Dudley, planned the exclusion of his older half-sister from the line of succession. The king's intentions aligned closely with Dudley's fears: Dudley, who had become for Mary a symbol of the hated Reformation, reasonably believed that Mary might seek to eliminate both him and his family should she come to power. Both the King and Protector Dudley knew of Mary's intense devotion to the Catholic faith; the Princess had half accepted some of her father's reforms, but bitterly disapproved of all those made by Edward, and both Edward and Dudley feared that if she came to the throne, she would re-establish Catholicism, reversing all the reforms made. Mary regarded the Pope's cause as her own, and her Catholic convictions were so strong that when the Edwardian Parliament passed an Act of Uniformity in 1549 that abolished the Roman Rite and prescribed that religious services be conducted in English, Mary defied it by continuing to have the traditional Latin mass celebrated in her private chapels. When Edward and his officials pressured Mary to conform to the Law of Uniformity, the Princess appealed her situation to her first cousin, Emperor Charles V, the most powerful monarch in Catholic Europe, who threatened to intervene militarily in England if the Government continued to interfere with Mary's religion. Edward was warned by his advisors that he could not disinherit just one of his older half-sisters; he would have to also disinherit Elizabeth although she, like Edward, was Protestant. Instigated by Northumberland, Edward decided to disinherit both Mary and Elizabeth, thus contravening the Succession Act of 1544, and appointed Jane Grey as his heir. For more than a year, the Imperial ambassador Jehan de Scheyfye had been convinced of Northumberland being engaged in some "mighty plot" to settle the Crown on his own head, and informed Charles V of the situation.

The essence of Edward's will was to give priority to the throne to the unborn sons of Lady Frances Brandon, followed by the unborn sons of her daughter Jane Grey. The choice of the descendants of Henry VII's youngest daughter was the only one acceptable to Edward. He could not follow Salic law because of the paucity of men in the Tudor line; the only eligible male, the Scotsman Henry Stewart, Lord Darnley, barely 6 or 7 years old and son of the King's first cousin, Lady Margaret Douglas, was Catholic and therefore unacceptable to the monarch. The Plantagenet men were also unacceptable; Edward Courtenay, descendant of Catherine of York, grandaunt of Edward VI, was not only Catholic, but had also spent many years imprisoned in the Tower. Reginald Pole and his relatives were also Catholics and political emigrants. Having excluded from consideration the descendants of the Plantagenets, the descendants of his aunt Margaret (the Scottish Stewarts) and his own older half-sisters Mary and Elizabeth, Edward was forced to choose from the descendants of his aunt Mary, Dowager Queen of France and Duchess of Suffolk. There were no male descendants in this branch of the Tudors, and the oldest woman of childbearing age was Mary's thirty-five-year-old daughter Frances Grey. If Frances could not bear a child, Frances's eldest daughter, Jane, could. She was young, healthy, and brought up in the Protestant faith, and her other qualities were not important.

Edward VI personally supervised the copying of his will, which was finally issued as letters patent on 21 June and signed by 102 notables, among them the whole Privy Council, peers, bishops, judges, and London aldermen. Edward also announced to have his "declaration" passed in parliament in September, and the necessary writs were prepared. The King died at about nine o'clock on the evening of 6 July 1553, but his death was not announced until four days later. Jane, at that time living out of town in Chelsea, remained unaware of the decision of the late King and the Privy Council. According to Jane's own imprisoned testimony in August 1553, around 19 June, she received her first informal warning of Edward's choice and did not consider it serious. On the afternoon of 9 July, she received a strange summons to attend a Council meeting at Syon House, Northumberland's unfinished palace. There, after a long wait, she was met by Dudley, her father-in-law, along with Francis Hastings, William Herbert, William Parr, and Henry Fitzalan. The nobles informed Jane Grey of the king's death and that, in accordance with his will, she was to accept the crown of England. She was initially reluctant to accept the crown, although she later relented after pressure from an assembly of nobles, including her parents and her parents in-law, while Guildford chimed in with a lovelier approach, with "prayers and caresses". On 10 July she was officially proclaimed Queen of England, France and Ireland and that same day, she and her husband Guildford made their ceremonial entry into the Tower of London, where English monarchs customarily resided from the time of accession until coronation. After the young couple's arrival at the Tower, Guildford began demanding to be made king. Jane had a long discussion about this with Guildford, who "assented that if he were to be made king, he would be so by me, by Act of Parliament". However, Jane would agree only to make him Duke of Clarence; Guildford replied that he did not want to be a duke, but the king. When the Duchess of Northumberland heard of the argument, she became furious and forbade Guildford to sleep any longer with his wife. She also commanded him to leave the Tower and go home, but Jane insisted that he remain at court by her side.

=== Mary's claim and Jane's final downfall ===
Princess Mary was last seen by Edward in mid-February, although both her advisors and the Imperial Ambassador, Jehan de Scheyfve, were keeping her informed about the state of her brother's health. At the end of June, the Princess moved from her estate at Newhall to the nearby residence of Hunsdon House, 28 miles (45 km) north of London. Before the move, she had defiantly ordered that Hunsdon be prepared for a long stay. During those days, Mary was invited to visit her dying brother. However her advisers warned her that it was a plan devised by Northumberland to capture her and thus facilitate Jane's accession to the throne. On 4 July, two days before Edward's death, Mary left Hunsdon and headed first to Cambridge and then to her extensive estates around Kenninghall in Norfolk. Mary was the largest landowner in East Anglia: after her father's death in 1547 she received 32 estates in Norfolk, Suffolk and Essex. (Note: See also a map of Mary's possessions in 1547 and 1553. Archive: 19 October 2013 at the Wayback Machine (appendix to McIntosh, 2009).) Along with the inheritance, Mary received for the first time in her life a large support group "on the land" — clients from the local nobility and common people. (Note: In the summer of 1549, a major peasant rebellion occurred in Norfolk, on Mary's lands. On 27 August, two thousand rebels were killed in a decisive battle with John Dudley's forces. The memory of this loss fed the Norfolk people's hatred of the Dudley regime for many years - and turned them into Mary's supporters.)

The reasons for Mary's decision to flee on 4 July remain unknown. Modern historians reject stories that well-wishers warned Mary of the danger halfway to London: she regularly received news from London, and fully understood the risks of her position. The circumstances of Mary's flight are surrounded by legends and unreliable testimonies. The chronology of Mary's journey has been reconstructed by historians from scattered accounts, none of which gives a complete picture of the events. The most important source Vita Mariae Angliae reginae by Robert Wingfield, a participant in Mary's campaign, does not give accurate dates. (Note: Ives 2009, p. 226 provides a traditional reconstruction of the chronology based on Wingfield's account and a critical analysis of it.)

The day after Edward's death, Northumberland sent his son Robert and a small army of 300 men to Hunsdon to watch over Mary, although at the time they were unaware that the Princess had already left the manor for her estates in Norfolk. Learning that Mary was heading to Norfolk, Northumberland sent part of the Royal Navy to the Norfolk coasts to prevent their escape or the arrival of reinforcements from the Continent.

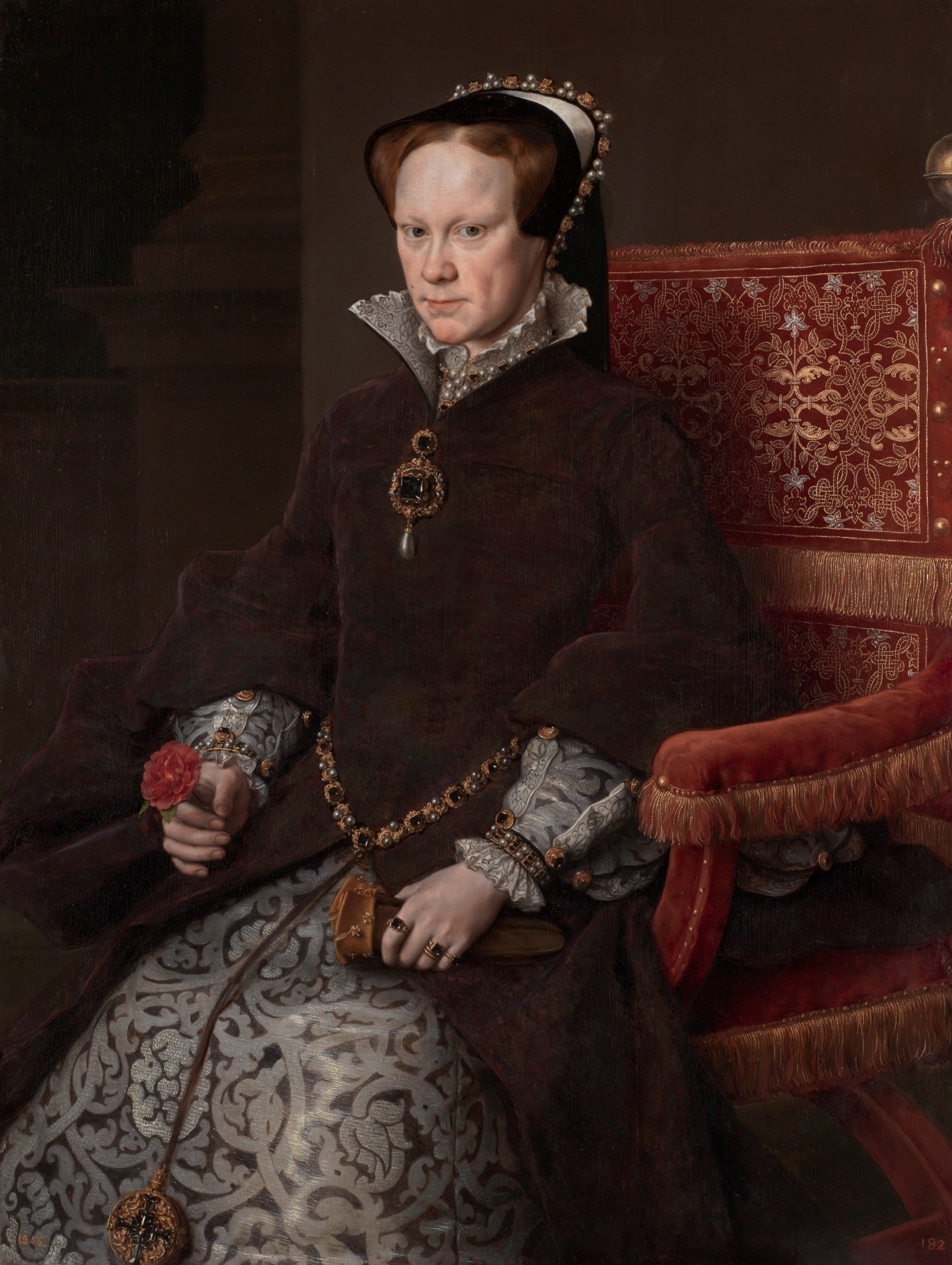
Mary Tudor became Queen following a coup d'état within the Privy Council, after Jane's brief nine-day reign.

On the evening of 7 July, while Mary was at the Manor of Euston Hall near Thetford, she was overtaken by messengers from London with the information that her brother had died the day before. She was first informed by a courier sent by Nicholas Throckmorton. The Princess, probably fearing Dudley's provocation, did not act immediately, but waited for confirmation from a reliable source — most likely her personal physician, Thomas Hughes, who had access to the palace. After confirming the authenticity of the news, on the morning of 8 July Mary urgently returned to Kenninghall, where she and her advisors began preparing to summon her supporters.

To claim her right to the throne, Mary began assembling her supporters in East Anglia. In the afternoon of 8 July, she summoned them to Kenninghall. At the same time support for Mary began to grow throughout the country: nobles, royal officials and municipal councils declared their support for Mary. Mary's party consisted of a core of committed Catholics hoping to reestablish the traditional faith and defeat Protestantism, and many fellow travelers who joined the rebellion for a variety of motives. Mary made full use of the underground network of like-minded Catholics, but she also needed the support of Protestants and therefore refrained from religious rhetoric for the time being. Paradoxically, Mary was supported not only by individual Protestants but also by entire Protestant communities, such as the urban community of Coventry.

Soon the most powerful noblemen in the area, both Catholics and Protestants, would begin to join the cause: Henry Radcliffe, Earl of Sussex, Lord-lieutenant of Norfolk and who initially supported Jane, defected and joined Mary. The Lord Viceroy of Suffolk, Thomas Wentworth, initially supported Jane on 11 July but moved with his troops to Mary's side on 14 July, probably out of self-preservation as his home was only 20 miles from Mary's camp. Thomas Cornwallis, Sheriff of Norfolk and Suffolk and Richard Southwell, one of the authors of the "Declaration", did the same. The reluctant John de Vere, Earl of Oxford, was persuaded by his own servants, who were prepared to go to Mary with or without their master.

On 9 July, from Kenninghall, Mary sent a letter saying that she was now Queen and demanded the obedience of the Privy Council. The letter arrived on 10 July, the same day as Jane's proclamation in London. Jane's proclamation in London was greeted by the public with murmurs of discontent. The council replied to Mary's letter that Jane was queen by Edward's authority and that Mary, by contrast, was illegitimate and supported only by "a few lewd, base people". Dudley interpreted the letter as a threat, although at that time he had not prepared for resolute action on Mary's part since he needed at least a week to try to build up a larger force. On the night of 10 July, during dinner, the Duchess of Suffolk, Jane's mother, and the Duchess of Northumberland broke into tears, due to the arrival of Mary's letter, as the duchesses knew that they could be left in a vulnerable position if Mary triumphed and acceded to the throne.

On 12 July, Mary and her supporters gathered an army of nearly 20,000 at Framlingham Castle, Suffolk, Duke of Norfolk's property, eventually to confront the forces led by Dudley. On 14 July, Northumberland openly recognized the serious threat Mary posed and decided to set out for East Anglia to capture her. The road to this decision was not an easy one: there was no consensus among the advisors, and Jane unexpectedly intervened. According to one source, she demanded that her own father be appointed commander; according to others, she protested against such an appointment. Contemporaries recognized that Henry Grey was unsuitable for the role, and other available candidates were weak. Dudley was forced to take command of the punitive campaign. The Duke was one of the most experienced military men in the kingdom, but he openly distrusted many of the members of the Council. That same day, Northumberland, accompanied by his sons John, Earl of Warwick, the Duke's heir apparent, and Lord Ambrose, left London and headed to Cambridge with 1,500 troops and some artillery, having reminded his councilors colleagues of the gravity of the cause.

On the morning of 18 July, Dudley left Cambridge for Framlingham, expecting to receive reinforcements along the way. Instead, he was met at Newmarket by a messenger with alarming news from London. Dudley reached Bury St. Edmunds, turned back, and returned to Cambridge on 20 July, where he was overtaken by news of a coup d'état in London. There are several explanations for what happened at Bury St. Edmunds. According to the traditional version, Dudley's forces were undermined by mass desertions: by 19 July, the Regent had nothing to fight with. However, all sources reporting militia desertions are based on hearsay, and all influential, named commanders remained in the ranks on 19 July. It has been suggested that Mary's agents deprived the army of food by stealing cattle. According to Eric Ives, Dudley refused to fight because of the intelligence he had received about the size and composition of the enemy forces. As they approached, the quality of the intelligence improved, and by 19 July Dudley was convinced that he was facing 10,000 men in prepared positions. Perhaps, writes Ives, the decisive factor that tipped the balance in Mary's favour was the arrival of the Royal Navy artillery.

Supported by the nobility and gentry of East Anglia and the Thames Valley, Mary's forces were gathering strength daily and, through luck, came into possession of powerful artillery from the Royal Navy. Given the circumstances, and the fact that the Council had switched sides, Dudley reconsidered the situation and deemed that launching a last fight against Mary was going to be a hopeless campaign.

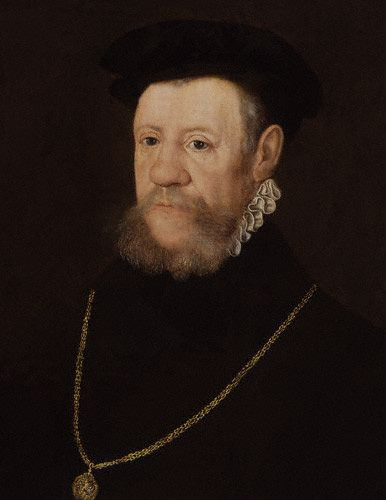
Henry FitzAlan, 12th Earl of Arundel

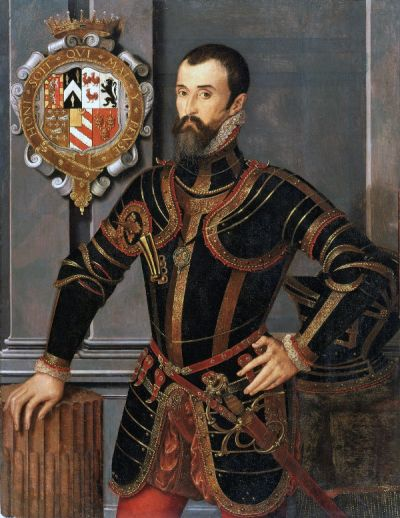
William Herbert, 1st Earl of Pembroke

Leaders of the coup in the Privy Council against Jane and Northumberland, paving the way for Mary's accession.

Dudley's forces retreated from Bury St. Edmunds and returned to Cambridge. Stranded in Cambridge, Northumberland surrendered and proclaimed Mary in the Marketplace, as he had been ordered in a letter from the Council. After proclaiming Mary, the Duke raised his cap and "laughed to try to hide the tears that fell down his pain-filled cheeks". Two members of the Council, the Catholics William Paget and Henry FitzAlan, 12th Earl of Arundel, rode to Framlingham to beg Mary's pardon, on behalf of the majority of the councillors, for having signed the document removing her from the succession and placing Jane on the throne. After swearing the oath to Mary, the new Queen ordered Paget and FitzAlan to Cambridge to arrest Northumberland. Dudley took refuge with his children at King's College while a group of townsmen and university scholars surrounded the premises to try to arrest the Duke and his children. In contrast to his father and his brother, Warwick resisted arrest. A letter from the Council arrived that everyman could go his way, so the Duke asked to be set free, "and so continued they all night [at liberty]".

At dawn on 21 July, the Duke and his sons "was booted ready to have ridden in the morning", and escape. However it was too late, as that same morning Arundel arrived to once again arrest the Duke, his sons, and his entourage. The prisoners returned riding side by side through London to the Tower on 25 July, the guards having difficulties protecting them against the hostile populace. A pamphlet appearing shortly after Northumberland's arrest illustrated the general hatred of him: "the great devil Dudley ruleth, Duke I should have said". He was now commonly thought to have poisoned Edward while Mary "would have been as glad of her brother's life, as the ragged bear is glad of his death". Dumbfounded by the turn of events, the French ambassador Antoine de Noailles wrote: "I have witnessed the most sudden change believable in men, and I believe that God alone worked it". The Council switched their allegiance and proclaimed Mary queen in London, on 19 July. A majority of the councillors moved out of the Tower before switching their allegiance. Becoming aware of his colleagues' change of mind, Jane's father abandoned his command of the fortress and proclaimed Mary I on nearby Tower Hill. The historical consensus assumes that this was in recognition of overwhelming support of the population for Mary. However there is no clear evidence for that outside Norfolk and Suffolk, where Northumberland had put down Kett's Rebellion, and many Catholics and opponents of Northumberland lived there. The main support for Mary came from the Privy Council, when the Earl of Arundel, along with William Herbert, 1st Earl of Pembroke led a coup d'état while Northumberland was away, leading the campaign to try to capture Mary. Arundel, one of the leaders of the Conservative faction within the Council and a staunch opponent of the reformist religious policies of both the King and Northumberland, had been imprisoned twice by Dudley for having sided with the previous Protector, Somerset; but it is not clear why Pembroke participated in the coup, especially since his son and heir, Henry, had married Jane's sister, Katherine, the same day as Jane and Guildford Dudley's wedding. Once the coup was consummated, the rest of the councillors, including those who were still loyal to Jane, accepted it. On 19 July, the Council met at Baynard's Castle, Pembroke's property, to end Jane's claim to the throne and proclaim Mary as Queen of England. That same day, a few hours before Mary's proclamation in London, the baptism of one of the Gentlemen Pensioners' children took place. Jane had agreed to be the godmother and wished the child's name to be Guildford. The Catholic Bishop of Winchester, Stephen Gardiner, who had been imprisoned in the Tower for five years for his opposition to the reformist policies of Edward VI's government, took great offence at this fact as he heard of it.

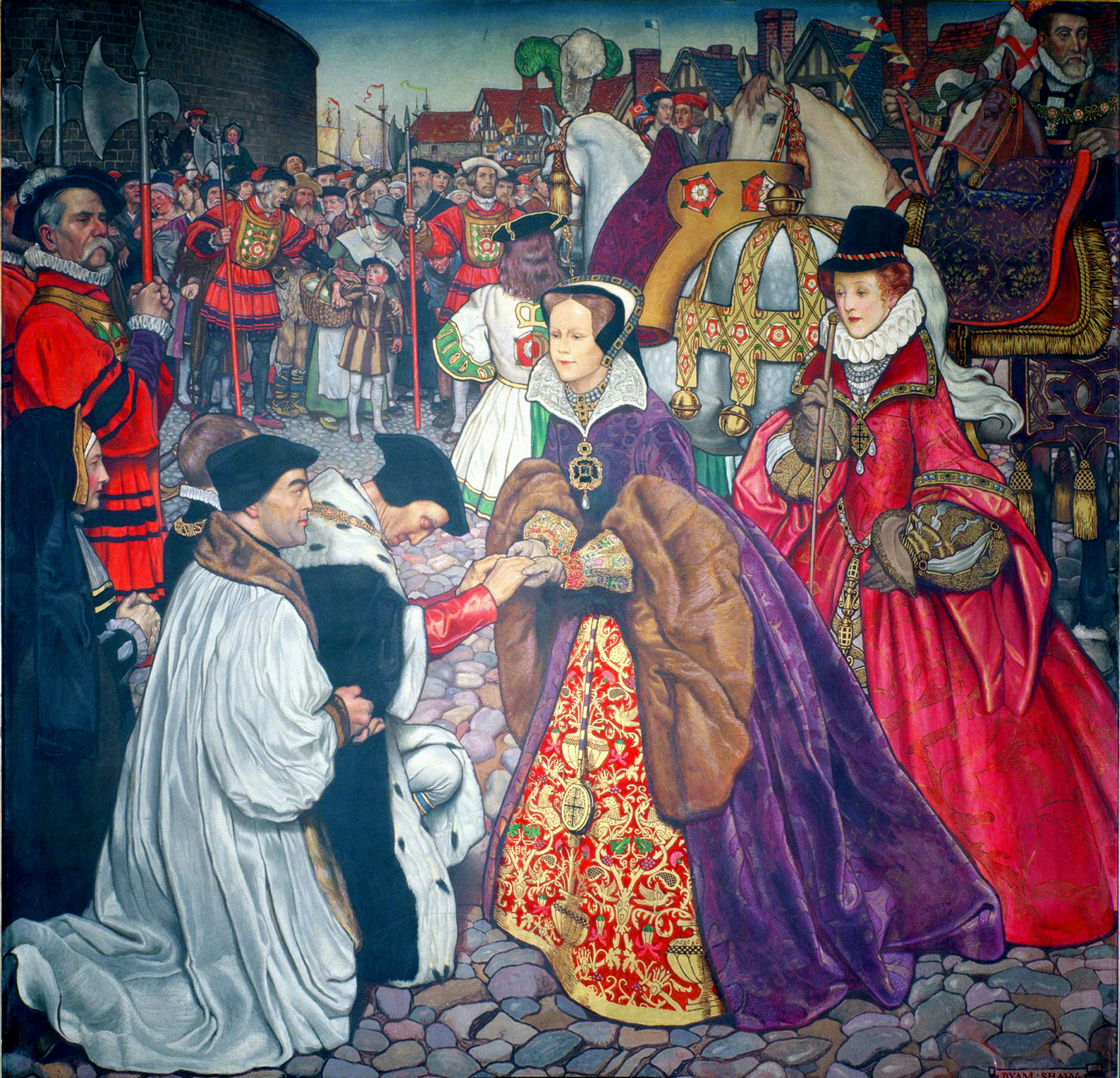
1910 depiction of Mary I entering London triumphantly, 15 days after the Council deposed Jane Grey and proclaimed Mary the new Queen

On 24 July, after receiving news of Northumberland's arrest at Cambridge, Mary left Framlingham for London and rode triumphantly into the capital on 3 August, on a wave of popular support. She was accompanied by her half-sister Elizabeth and a procession of over 800 nobles and gentlemen. In keeping with old English tradition, she ordered the release of several high-ranking prisoners from the Tower: Anne Seymour, dowager Duchess of Somerset and aunt of the late King Edward, (Note: Anne was the widow of Edward Seymour, 1st Duke of Somerset, Edward VI's maternal uncle executed for treason in January 1552 amidst bidding against John Dudley for power and control of the young monarch's court.) Mary's relative Edward Courtenay, Bishop Gardiner, and the elderly Thomas Howard, 3rd Duke of Norfolk. Some prisoners such as Courtenay and the Duke of Norfolk had been imprisoned since the reign of Henry VIII, while Gardiner and the Duchess of Somerset were arrested during the reign of Edward VI. A few days later, Gardiner was appointed Lord Chancellor, and Howard was appointed to preside over the trial of Dudley and his companions.

Jane is often called the Nine-Day Queen; however, if her reign is dated from the moment of Edward's death on 6 July 1553, it could be reckoned to have lasted for almost two weeks (13 days). On 19 July 1553, Jane was imprisoned in the Tower's Gentleman Gaoler's apartments, and Guildford was imprisoned in the Bell Tower. There he was soon joined by his brother, Robert. The rest of Guildford's brothers and their father were imprisoned in the other towers. On 18 August, Dudley, his sons, John Gates and other officials and noblemen involved in the plot to enthrone Jane Grey were tried for high treason; they were all found guilty and sentenced to death. After the sentence was pronounced, Dudley re-converted to Catholicism, confessed to Bishop Gardiner, and was then led through the Tower in a pompous Catholic procession with the other renounced Protestant convicts. Despite Dudley's re-conversion to the Catholic faith and the Duchess of Northumberland's desperate pleas to the Queen to spare her husband's execution, nothing changed the final verdict, and on 22 August, after giving a final speech admitting his guilt for the acts of which he was accused, the Duke was beheaded on Tower Hill. The day before he was executed, Dudley attended Mass and took the communion at the Chapel of St. Peter ad Vincula. Dudley's religious retraction outraged Jane, who was a fervent Protestant. In September, the first Parliament of Mary's reign revoked the provisions of Edward's will that favoured Jane's succession, declaring Mary her brother's rightful heir, and denounced and revoked Jane's proclamation as a usurper.

For centuries, the attempt to alter the succession was mostly seen as a one-man plot by Northumberland. Since the 1970s, however, many historians have attributed the inception of the "devise" and the insistence on its implementation to the king's initiative. Diarmaid MacCulloch has made out Edward's "teenage dreams of founding an evangelical realm of Christ", while David Starkey has stated that "Edward had a couple of co-operators, but the driving will was his". Among other members of the Privy Council, Northumberland's intimate John Gates has been suspected of suggesting to Edward to change his devise so that Jane herself—not just any sons of hers—could inherit the Crown. Whatever the degree of his contribution, Edward was convinced that his word was law and fully endorsed disinheriting his half-sisters: "barring Mary from the succession was a cause in which the young King believed".

== Trial and execution ==
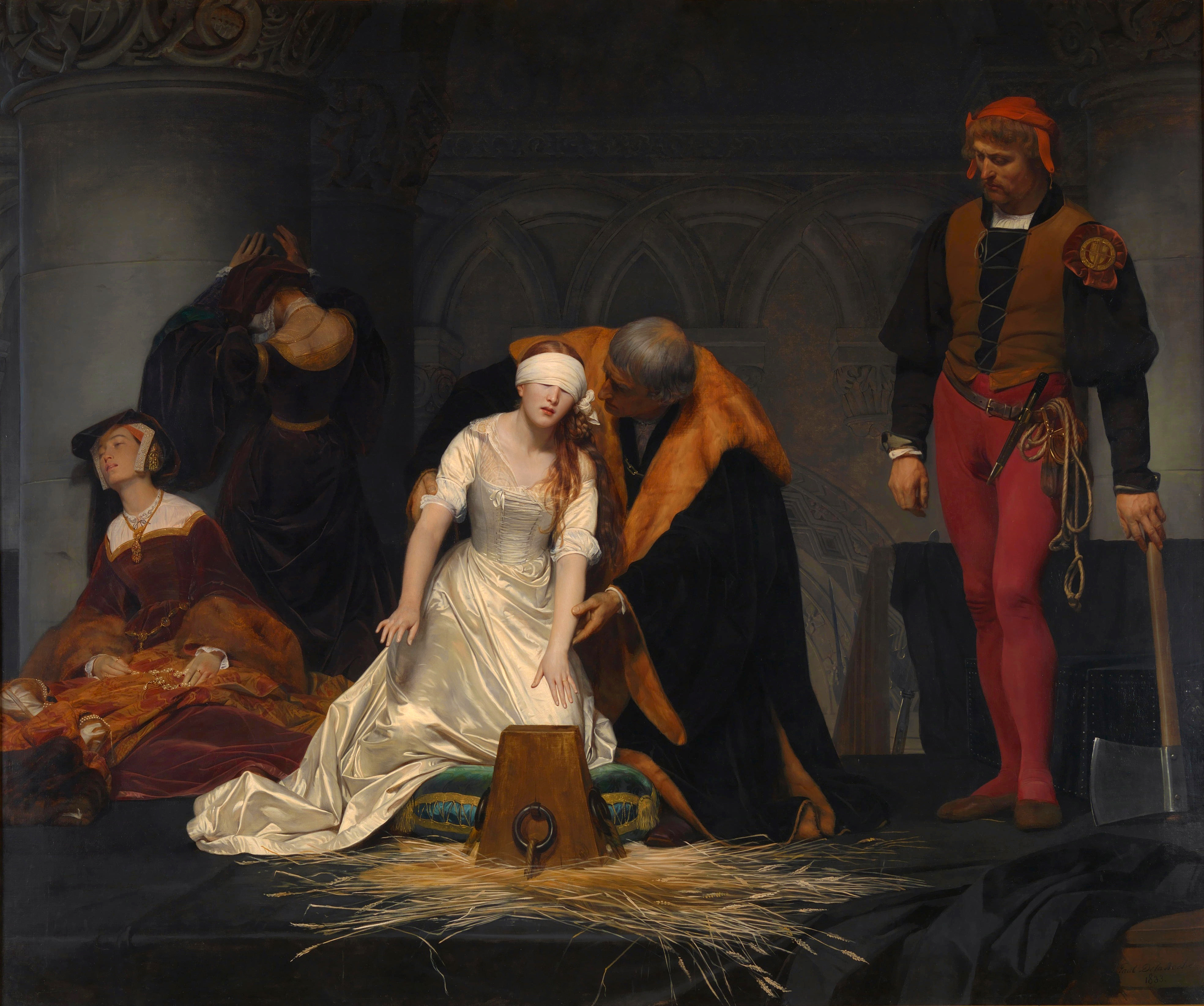
The Execution of Lady Jane Grey (Paul Delaroche, 1833)

Referred to by the court as Jane Dudley, wife of Guildford, Jane was charged with high treason, as were her husband, two of his brothers, and the archbishop of Canterbury, Thomas Cranmer. Their trial, by a special commission, took place on 13 November 1553, at Guildhall in the City of London. The commission was chaired by Thomas White, Lord Mayor of London, and Thomas Howard, 3rd Duke of Norfolk. Other members included Edward Stanley, 3rd Earl of Derby, and John Bourchier, 2nd Earl of Bath. As was to be expected, all defendants were found guilty and sentenced to death. The Duke of Suffolk was also accused of high treason and sentenced to death, but thanks to his wife's close friendship with Mary, he was temporarily saved from being executed, although he remained under house arrest. Jane's guilt, of having treacherously assumed the title and the power of the monarch, was evidenced by a number of documents she had signed as "Jane the Quene". Her sentence was to "be burned alive on Tower Hill or beheaded as the Queen pleases". Burning was the traditional English punishment for treason committed by women. The imperial ambassador reported to Charles V, Holy Roman Emperor, that her life was to be spared.

Jane submitted a letter of explanation to the Queen, "asking forgiveness ... for the sin she was accused of, informing her majesty about the truth of events". In this account, she spoke of herself as "a wife who loves her husband".

In December, Jane was allowed to walk freely in the Queen's Garden. Lord Robert and Lord Guildford had to be content with taking the air on the leads of the Bell Tower. Jane and Guildford may have had some contact with each other, and at some point Guildford wrote a message to his father-in-law in Jane's prayer book:

Your loving and obedient son wishes unto your grace long life in this world with as much joy and comfort as ever I wish to myself, and in the world to come joy everlasting. Your humble son to his death, G. Dudley

Mary initially decided to spare the lives of Jane and her husband, assuming that they had been mere pawns in the midst of a much larger political scheme designed and orchestrated by Northumberland. The Duke was executed on 22 August 1553, a month after Mary's accession to the throne. However, the outbreak of Wyatt's Rebellion in January 1554 against Queen Mary's marriage plans with Philip of Spain would ultimately seal Jane's fate. The Queen's marriage plan was greeted with widespread opposition, not just among the populace but also among Members of Parliament and some of the privy councillors, and the Rebellion, which was joined by the Duke of Suffolk and Guildford's brothers, Robert and Henry Dudley, resulted from this dislike. It was not the intention of the conspirators to bring Jane to the throne again. Nevertheless, at the height of the crisis, the Government decided to reactivate the sentence, which had remained suspended, against Jane and her husband. Jane was becoming a serious threat to Mary, so the executions of Grey and Guildford Dudley were also an opportunity to remove possible inspirations for future unrest and unwelcome reminders of the past. It troubled Mary to let her cousin die, but she accepted the Privy Council's recommendation. Bishop and Lord Chancellor Gardiner pressed for the young couple's execution in a court sermon, and the Imperial ambassador Simon Renard was happy to report that "Jane of Suffolk and her husband are to lose their heads". Mary signed the order on 19 January, and the execution was initially scheduled for 9 February, although it was later postponed for three days to give Jane a chance to convert to Catholicism. Jane asked for a visit from Protestant divine, but Mary denied her request, and instead she sent her chaplain, Father John Feckenham to see Jane, who was initially not pleased about this. They debated theological matters and although Feckenham did not succeed in converting Jane to Catholicism, he was impressed by her intelligence, education, and strong character. They forged a close friendship, and she allowed him to accompany her to the scaffold.

The day before their executions, Guildford asked Jane to have one last meeting, which she refused, explaining it "would only ... increase their misery and pain, it was better to put it off ... as they would meet shortly elsewhere, and live bound by indissoluble ties". Shortly before her execution in February 1554, Jane wrote farewell messages to her father, Henry Grey, and Sir John Brydges, Lieutenant of the Tower of London, in the margins of a manuscript prayer book. This may have been the book she carried to the scaffold, and is now in the British Library as Harley MS 2342.

Around ten o'clock on the morning of 12 February, Guildford was led towards Tower Hill, where "many ... gentlemen" waited to shake hands with him. Guildford made a short speech to the assembled crowd, as was customary. "Having no ghostly father with him", (Note: Guildford had probably refused to be attended by a Catholic priest and been denied a Protestant divine.) he knelt, prayed, and asked the people to pray for him, "holding up his eyes and hands to God many times". Guildford was executed with one stroke of the axe, after which his body was conveyed on a cart to the Chapel of St Peter ad Vincula for burial. Watching the scene from her window, Jane exclaimed: "Oh, Guildford, Guildford!" She was then taken out to Tower Green, inside the Tower, to be beheaded. According to the account of her execution given in the anonymous Chronicle of Queen Jane and of Two Years of Queen Mary, which formed the basis for Raphael Holinshed's depiction, Jane gave a speech upon ascending the scaffold:

Good people, I am come hither to die, and by a law I am condemned to the same. The fact, indeed, against the Queen's highness was unlawful, and the consenting thereunto by me: but touching the procurement and desire thereof by me or on my behalf, I do wash my hands thereof in innocency before God and the face of you Christian people, this day.

Before being executed, Jane, although dying as a Protestant, thanked Feckenham for his company in her final moments and said goodbye to the Catholic priest, telling him: "Go and may God satisfy every wish of yours", acknowledging that although they had disagreed on Earth, she believed they might meet in a better place. Feckenham burst into tears after the execution.

Jane then recited Psalm 51 (Have mercy upon me, O God) in English, and handed her gloves and handkerchief to her maid. The executioner asked her for forgiveness, which she granted him, pleading: "I pray you dispatch me quickly". Referring to her head, she asked, "Will you take it off before I lay me down?", and the axeman answered, "No, madam". She then blindfolded herself. Jane then failed to find the block with her hands, and cried, "What shall I do? Where is it?" Probably Thomas Brydges, the Deputy Lieutenant of the Tower, helped her find her way. With her head on the block, Jane spoke the last words of Jesus as recounted in the Gospel of Luke: "Lord, into thy hands I commend my spirit!"

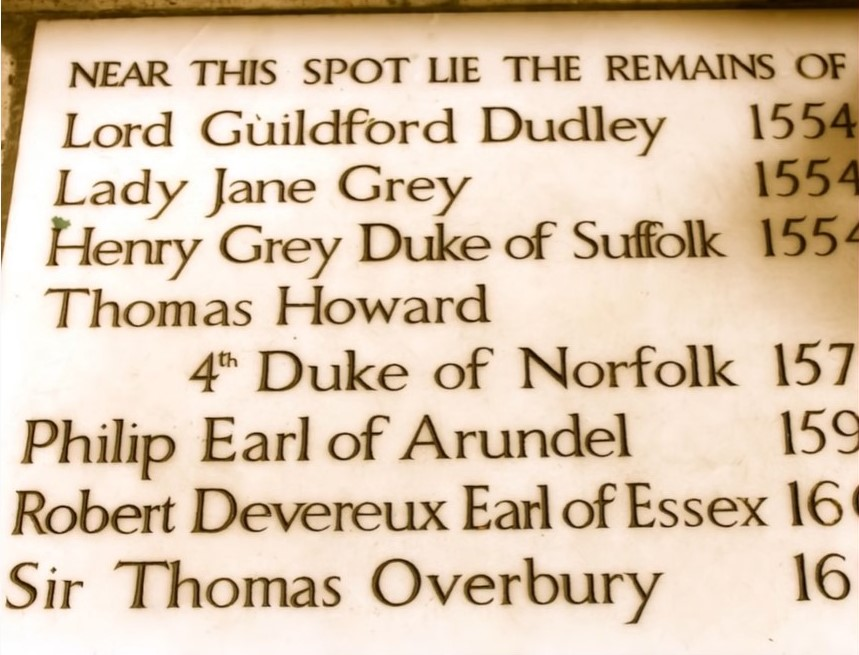
Memorial tablet for Jane Grey, in St Peter ad Vincula

Jane and Guildford are most likely buried within the Tower walls, in the Chapel of St Peter ad Vincula—though this is not certain. No memorial stone was erected at their grave. Jane's father, the Duke of Suffolk, was executed 11 days after Jane, on 23 February 1554.

The executions did not contribute to Mary's or the government's popularity. Five months after the couple's death, John Knox, the famous Scottish reformer, wrote of them as "innocents ... such as by just laws and faithful witnesses can never be proved to have offended by themselves". Of Guildford Dudley, the chronicler Grafton wrote ten years later: "even those that never before the time of his execution saw him, did with lamentable tears bewail his death". Jane was considered a martyr by Protestants, appearing on several pages of Book of Martyrs (Acts and Monuments) by John Foxe.

Shortly after the executions of her son and daughter-in-law, and knowing the Queen's harsh character, the dowager Duchess of Northumberland pleaded with Mary to allow her surviving children to attend Mass. During 1554, the duchess and her son-in-law, Henry Sidney, Mary Dudley's husband, travelled to Spain to continue pleading for her family in front of the new co-ruler of England, King Philip, and the circle of Spanish noblemen who were around him at his court in Madrid. In the autumn of 1554 Guildford's brothers and sisters (Robert, Henry, John, Ambrose, Mary and Katherine) were released from the Tower.

Jane's mother, Frances, maintained good relations with Mary, who allowed her to reside in Richmond, although at the time she was still viewed with some suspicion by the Queen, and employed Frances's two surviving daughters as maids of honour. In late 1554 there was talk of a possible marriage between Frances and her relative Edward Courtenay, 1st Earl of Devon, but Courtenay, who was suspected of involvement in Wyatt's Rebellion, was reluctant to marry the dowager Duchess and soon went into exile to the Republic of Venice, where he subsequently died. She married her Master of the Horse and chamberlain, Adrian Stokes, in March 1555. She died in 1559.

== Cultural depictions ==
In 1836, American poet Lydia Sigourney published a poem, "Lady Jane Grey", in her volume Zinzendorff and Other Poems. In 1911, the British historian Albert Pollard called Jane "the traitor-heroine of the Reformation". During the Marian persecutions and its aftermath, Jane became viewed as a Protestant martyr, featuring prominently in the several editions of Foxe's Book of Martyrs (Actes and Monuments of these Latter and Perillous Dayes) by John Foxe.

Fictional treatments of Lady Jane Grey's story include the historical novels, Innocent Traitor (Alison Weir's 2006 debut novel), Her Highness, the Traitor by Susan Higginbotham (2012), The Lady of Misrule by Suzannah Dunn (2015), and The Last Tudor, by Philippa Gregory (2017). The featured figure of a debut historical retellings series by Cynthia Hand, Brodi Ashton, and Jodi Meadows titled My Lady Jane (2016) focuses on Lady Jane Grey's life in a fantastical "what-if" scenario. My Lady Jane (2024) was turned into a comedic historical series on Amazon Prime.

Three films have been produced telling the story of Lady Jane Grey and her nine-day rule: the 1923 silent film Lady Jane Grey; Or, The Court of Intrigue, the 1936 film Tudor Rose (U.S. title: Nine Days a Queen) with Nova Pilbeam as Lady Jane Grey, and the 1986 film Lady Jane directed by Trevor Nunn and starring Helena Bonham Carter in the title role.

== Family tree ==
Jane's relationship to the House of Tudor and other claimants to the English throne

Italics indicate people who predeceased Edward VI;
Arabic numerals (1–5) indicate Edward VI's line of succession at his death according to Henry VIII's will; and
Roman numerals (I–III) indicate Edward VI's line of succession at his death according to Edward's will.

Henry VII of England	Elizabeth of York
Henry VIII	Margaret Tudor	Mary Tudor	Charles Brandon
Edward VI	Mary I (1)	Elizabeth I (2)	James V of Scotland	Frances Brandon	Henry Grey
Mary, Queen of Scots	Jane Grey (3, I)	Katherine Grey (4, II)	Mary Grey (5, III)

== Bibliography ==
- Alford, Stephen (2002). Kingship and Politics in the Reign of Edward VI. Cambridge University Press. ISBN 978-0-521-03971-0.
- Alford, Stephen (2014). Edward VI: The Last Boy King. London: Penguin. ISBN 978-0-14-197691-4.
- Ascham, Roger (1863). Mayor, John E. B. (ed.). The Scholemaster (1863 ed.). London: Bell & Daldy. OCLC 251212421.
- Bellamy, John (1979). The Tudor Law of Treason. Toronto: Routledge, Kegan & Paul. ISBN 0-7100-8729-2.
- Chapman, Hester W. (1962). Lady Jane Grey: October 1537-February 1554. Jonathan Cape. OCLC 51384729.
- de Lisle, Leanda (2008). The Sisters Who Would Be Queen: Mary, Katherine and Lady Jane Grey. A Tudor Tragedy. New York: Ballantine. ISBN 978-0-345-49135-0.
- Dickens, A. G. (1967), The English Reformation, London: Fontana, ISBN 978-0-00-686115-7
- Edwards, J. Stephan (2007), "On the Date of Birth of Jane Grey Dudley", Notes & Queries Vol. 54, Issue 3, September 2007, pp.240-242, ISSN 0029-3970
- Edwards, J. Stephan (2008), "A Further Note on the Date of Birth of Lady Jane Grey Dudley", Notes & Queries Vol. 55, Issue 2, June 2008, pp.146-148, ISSN 0029-3970
- Elton, G. R. (1977), Reform and Reformation, London: Edward Arnold, ISBN 978-0-7131-5953-0
- Erickson, Carolly (1978), Bloody Mary, New York: Doubleday, ISBN 978-0-385-11663-3
- Florio, Michelangelo (1607). Historia de la vita e dela morte de l'Illustriss. Signora Giovanna Graia (in Italian). Riccardo Pittore di Venezia.
- Foxe, John (1875). Foxe's Book of Martyrs. Charles Foster Publishing Company.
- Froude, James Anthony (1910). The Reign of Mary Tudor. London: J. M. Dent & Sons, New York: P. Dutton & Co.
- Hoak, Dale (1980), "Rehabilitating the Duke of Northumberland: Politics and Political Control, 1549–53", in Loach, Jennifer; Tittler, Robert (eds.), The Mid-Tudor Polity c. 1540–1560, London: Macmillan, pp. 29–51, ISBN 978-0-333-24528-6.
- Ives, Eric (2009). Lady Jane Grey: A Tudor Mystery. Wiley-Blackwell. ISBN 978-1-4051-9413-6.
- Jordan, W. K. (1970), Edward VI: The Threshold of Power. The Dominance of the Duke of Northumberland, London: George Allen & Unwin, ISBN 978-0-04-942083-0
- Lee, S. J. (2006). The Mid Tudors: Edward VI and Mary. Questions and Analysis in History. Routledge. p. 168. ISBN 978-0-203-96908-3.
- Loach, Jennifer (2002). Edward VI. New Haven, Connecticut: Yale University Press. ISBN 0-300-09409-4.
- Loades, David (1996). John Dudley Duke of Northumberland 1504–1553. Oxford: Clarendon. ISBN 0-19-820193-1.
- Loades, David (2004), Intrigue and Treason: The Tudor Court, 1547–1558, London: Pearson Longman, ISBN 978-0-582-77226-7
- MacCulloch, Diarmaid (2002), The Boy King: Edward VI and the Protestant Reformation, Berkeley: University of California Press, ISBN 978-0-520-23402-4
- Mackie, J. D. (1952), The Earlier Tudors, 1485–1558, Oxford: Clarendon
- Morrill, John S. (2021). Lady Jane Grey. Encyclopædia Britannica.
- Nichols, John Gough, ed. (1997) [1850]. Chronicle of Queen Jane and of Two Years of Queen Mary. The Camden Society; Marilee Hanson.
- Porter, Linda (2007). The First Queen of England: The Myth of "Bloody Mary". St. Martin's. ISBN 978-0-312-36837-1.
- Porter, Linda (2010). Mary Tudor: The First Queen. Hachette Digital. p. 9392. ISBN 978-0-7481-2232-5.
- Potter, Philip J. (2014). Monarchs of the Renaissance: The Lives and Reigns of 42 European Kings and Queens. McFarland. ISBN 978-0-7864-9103-2.
- Skidmore, Chris (2007), Edward VI: The Lost King of England, London: Weidenfeld & Nicolson, ISBN 978-0-297-84649-9
- Starkey, David (2001), Elizabeth. Apprenticeship, London: Vintage, ISBN 978-0-09-928657-8
- Tallis, Nicola (2016). Crown of Blood: The Deadly Inheritance of Lady Jane Grey. Pegasus Books. ISBN 978-1-68177-287-5.
- Tittler, Robert (1991), The Reign of Mary I, London: Longman, ISBN 978-0-582-06107-1
- Waller, Maureen (2006). Sovereign Ladies: The Six Reigning Queens of England. New York: St. Martin's Press. ISBN 0-312-33801-5. OL 9516816M.
- Whitelock, Anna (2009). Mary Tudor: England's First Queen. London: Bloomsbury. ISBN 978-0-7475-9018-7. LCCN 2009437824. OL 23681864M.
- Wilson, Derek A. (1981). Sweet Robin: A Biography of Robert Dudley, Earl of Leicester, 1533–1588. H. Hamilton. ISBN 0-241-10149-2.
- This article incorporates text from a publication now in the public domain: Chisholm, Hugh, ed. (1911). "Arundel, Earls of". Encyclopædia Britannica. Vol. 2 (11th ed.). Cambridge University Press. pp. 706–709.
- Bucholz, Robert; Key, Newton (2020). Early Modern England 1485-1714: A Narrative History (3 ed.). John Wiley & Sons Ltd. ISBN 978-1-118-53221-8.
- Meyer, G.J (2010). The Tudors Lady Jane Grey to Elizabeth I. Amberley Publishing. ISBN 9781445601441.
- Plowden, Alison (2011). The End of Lady Jane: nine days queen. History Press Limited. ISBN 9780750928168.

Lady Jane Grey House of Grey Born: 1537 Died: 12 February 1554
Regnal titles
Preceded by Edward VI as undisputed king	— DISPUTED — Queen of England and Ireland; 10–19 July 1553; Disputed by Mary I	Succeeded by Mary I as undisputed queen
