= Lord Guildford Dudley =

Consort of Lady Jane Grey in 1553

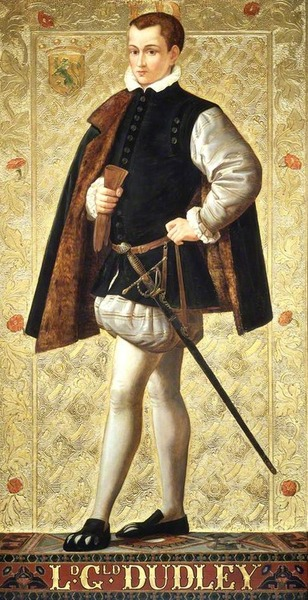
- 19th-century depiction of Guildford Dudley in the Houses of Parliament, Westminster

Consort of the English monarch
- Tenure: 10 July 1553 – 19 July 1553
- Born: c. 1535
- Died: 12 February 1554 (age 18–19); Tower Hill, London, England
- Cause of death: Beheading (execution)
- Burial: Church of St Peter ad Vincula, London
- Spouse: Lady Jane Grey (m. 1553)
- Father: John Dudley, 1st Duke of Northumberland
- Mother: Jane Guildford

Lord Guildford Dudley (also spelt Guilford) (c. 1535 – 12 February 1554) was an English nobleman who was married to Lady Jane Grey. She occupied the English throne from 10 July until 19 July 1553, having been declared the heir of King Edward VI. Guildford Dudley had a humanist education and married Jane in a magnificent celebration about six weeks before the King's death. After Guildford's father, the Duke of Northumberland, had engineered Jane's accession, Jane and Guildford spent her brief rule residing in the Tower of London. They were still in the Tower when their regime collapsed and remained there in different quarters as prisoners. They were condemned to death for high treason in November 1553. Queen Mary I was inclined to spare their lives, but Thomas Wyatt's rebellion against Mary's plans to marry Philip of Spain led to the young couple's execution, a measure that was widely seen as unduly harsh.

== Family and marriage ==
Coat of arms of the Dudley family

Lord Guildford Dudley was the second youngest surviving son of John Dudley, later Duke of Northumberland and his wife, Jane Guildford. The Dudley lineage goes back to a family called Sutton. In the early 14th century, they became the lords of Dudley Castle, from whom Guildford descended through his paternal grandfather. This was Edmund Dudley, a councillor of Henry VII, who, in 1510, after the accession of Henry VIII, was executed. Through his father's mother, Elizabeth Grey, 6th Baroness Lisle, Guildford descended from the Hundred Years War heroes, Richard Beauchamp, 13th Earl of Warwick, and John Talbot, 1st Earl of Shrewsbury.

The thirteen Dudley children grew up in a Protestant household and received a humanist education. Under the young King Edward VI, Guildford's father became Lord President of the Council and de facto ruled England from 1550 to 1553. The chronicler Richard Grafton, who knew him, described Guildford as "a comely, virtuous and goodly gentleman". In 1552 Northumberland unsuccessfully tried to arrange a marriage between Guildford and Margaret Clifford. Instead, in the spring of 1553, Guildford was engaged to the sixteen-year-old Jane Grey. Jane Grey and Margaret Clifford were both great-granddaughters of King Henry VII, but Jane figured higher in the line of succession. On 25 May 1553, three weddings were celebrated at Durham Place, the Duke of Northumberland's town mansion. Guildford married Jane; his sister Katherine married Henry Hastings, the Earl of Huntingdon's heir; and Jane's sister Katherine married Lord Herbert, the heir of the Earl of Pembroke. (Note: Traditionally these matches came to be seen as part of a conspiracy by the Duke of Northumberland to bring his family to the throne. Some historians, though, like David Loades, W.K. Jordan (Jordan and Gleason 1975 pp. 10–11) and Eric Ives (Ives 2009 p. 153) have interpreted them as "routine actions of dynastic politics" (Loades 1996 p. 239).) It was a magnificent festival, with jousts, games, and masques. For the latter, two different companies had been booked, one male, one female. The Venetian and French ambassadors were guests, and there were "large numbers of the common people ... and of the most principal of the realm". Guildford and some others suffered an attack of food poisoning, because of "a mistake made by a cook, who plucked one leaf for another".

== Claimed kingship ==
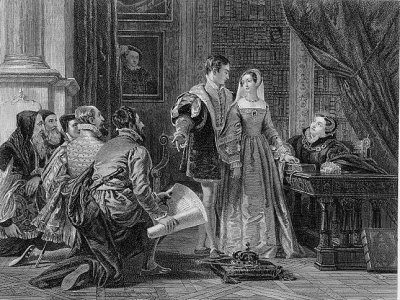
The Crown Offered to Lady Jane Grey, as imagined in the 1820s: Guildford and Jane are in the centre. Engraving after painting by Charles Robert Leslie

King Edward, in his "Devise of the Succession", settled the Crown on Jane Grey, his first cousin once removed, bypassing his half-sisters, Mary and Elizabeth. After Edward's death on 6 July 1553, the Duke of Northumberland undertook the enforcement of the King's will. The envoys of the Holy Roman Empire and France were sure of the plan's success. Jane was reluctant to accept the Crown: she gave in after remonstrances by an assembly of nobles, including her parents and in-laws, while Guildford chimed in with a lovelier approach, with "prayers and caresses". On 10 July Jane and Guildford made their ceremonial entry into the Tower of London. Residing in there, Guildford wanted to be made king; according to her own later account, Jane had a long discussion about this with Guildford, who "assented that if he were to be made king, he would be so by me, by Act of Parliament". However, Jane would agree only to make him Duke of Clarence; Guildford replied that he did not want to be a duke, but the king. When the Duchess of Northumberland heard of the argument, she became furious and forbade Guildford to sleep any longer with his wife. She also commanded him to leave the Tower and go home, but Jane insisted that he remain at court at her side.

According to later remarks by the Imperial ambassadors, the daily Council meetings were presided over by Guildford, who allegedly also dined in state alone and had himself addressed in regal style. Antoine de Noailles, the French ambassador, described Guildford as "the new King". The Imperial court in Brussels also believed in the existence of King Guildford.

== Imprisonment ==
On 10 July, the same day as Jane's proclamation, a letter from Mary Tudor arrived in London, saying that she was now queen and demanding the obedience of the Council. Mary was assembling her supporters in East Anglia; it was decided to take the field against her after some discussion over who should go, in which Jane made sure that her father should not. The Duke of Northumberland marched to Cambridge with his troops and passed a week that saw no action until he heard on 20 July that the Council in London had declared for Mary. Northumberland proclaimed Mary Tudor himself at the marketplace and was arrested the next morning. On 19 July, a few hours before Queen Mary I's proclamation in London, the baptism of one of the Gentlemen Pensioners' children took place. Jane had agreed to be the godmother and wished the child's name to be Guildford. The Bishop of Winchester, Stephen Gardiner, who had been imprisoned in the Tower for five years, took great offence at this fact as he heard of it.

A majority of the Privy Council moved out of the Tower before switching their allegiance. Becoming aware of his colleagues' change of mind, Jane's father, the Duke of Suffolk, abandoned his command of the fortress and proclaimed Mary I on nearby Tower Hill. After he had left, his wife was told she could also go home, while Jane, Guildford, and the Duchess of Northumberland were not allowed to. Jane was later moved from the royal apartments to the Gentleman Gaoler's lodgings and Guildford was imprisoned in the Bell Tower. There he was soon joined by his brother, Robert. His remaining brothers were imprisoned in other towers, as was his father, who was for the moment the only prominent person to go to the scaffold; Mary was prepared to spare Jane's and Guildford's lives, concluding that they were mere pawns in Northumberland's scheme.

Jane and Guildford were indicted on 12 August, and Jane submitted a letter of explanation to the Queen, "asking forgiveness ... for the sin she was accused of, informing her majesty about the truth of events." In this account, she spoke of herself as "a wife who loves her husband". On 13 November 1553, Jane and Guildford were tried at Guildhall, together with Archbishop Cranmer and Guildford's brothers Ambrose and Henry. They were all convicted of high treason after pleading guilty. Guildford was convicted of compassing to depose Queen Mary I by sending troops to the Duke of Northumberland and by proclaiming and honouring Jane as queen.

In December, Jane was allowed to walk freely in the Queen's Garden. Lord Robert and Lord Guildford had to be content with taking the air on the leads of the Bell Tower. Jane and Guildford may have had some contact with each other, and at some point Guildford wrote a message to his father-in-law in Jane's prayer book:

Your loving and obedient son wishes unto your grace long life in this world with as much joy and comfort as ever I wish to myself, and in the world to come joy everlasting. Your humble son to his death, G. Dudley

== Execution ==
Queen Mary I's plan to marry King Philip of Naples and Sicily (the future Philip II of Spain) was greeted with widespread opposition, not just among the populace but also among Members of Parliament and privy councillors. Thomas Wyatt's rebellion in early 1554, in which the Duke of Suffolk took part, resulted from this dislike. It was not the intention of the conspirators to bring Jane Grey to the throne again. Nevertheless, at the height of the military crisis around 7 February, the government decided to execute Jane and her husband for high treason, of which they had both been found guilty. It was also an opportunity to remove possible inspirations for future unrest and unwelcome reminders of the past. It troubled Mary to let her cousin die, but she accepted the Privy Council's advice. Bishop Gardiner pressed for the young couple's execution in a court sermon, and the Imperial ambassador Simon Renard was happy to report that "Jane of Suffolk and her husband are to lose their heads."

The day before their executions, Guildford asked Jane for a last meeting, which she refused, explaining it "would only ... increase their misery and pain, it was better to put it off ... as they would meet shortly elsewhere, and live bound by indissoluble ties." Around ten o'clock in the morning of 12 February, Guildford was led towards Tower Hill, where "many ... gentlemen" waited to shake hands with him. Guildford made a short speech to the assembled crowd, as was customary. "Having no ghostly father with him", (Note: Guildford had probably refused to be attended by a Catholic priest and been denied a Protestant divine (Nichols p. 55).) he knelt, prayed, and asked the people to pray for him, "holding up his eyes and hands to God many times". He was killed with one stroke of the axe, after which his body was conveyed on a cart to the Tower chapel of St Peter ad Vincula. Watching the scene from her window, Jane exclaimed: "Oh, Guildford, Guildford!" He was buried in the chapel with Jane, who was dead within the hour.

The executions did not contribute to Mary's or the government's popularity. Five months after the couple's death, John Knox, the famous Scottish reformer, wrote of them as "innocents ... such as by just laws and faithful witnesses can never be proved to have offended by themselves." Of Guildford, the chronicler Grafton wrote ten years later: "even those that never before the time of his execution saw him, did with lamentable tears bewail his death."

== In popular culture ==
Lord Guildford Dudley was portrayed by John Mills in the 1936 film Tudor Rose, Cary Elwes in the 1986 film Lady Jane, and Jacob Avery in the 2022 drama series Becoming Elizabeth.

He is a main character in Jodi Meadows, Brodi Ashton, and Cynthia Hand's novel My Lady Jane (2016), wherein he is known as "Gifford", and he is played by Edward Bluemel in the 2024 television series adaption My Lady Jane, with the character's name changed back to 'Guildford'. He is also a character in Alison Weir's Innocent Traitor: A Novel of Lady Jane Grey (2007).

== See also ==
- Cultural depictions of Lady Jane Grey
