= Edward Seymour, Lord Beauchamp =

English noble (1561–1612)

Edward Seymour
- Baron Beauchamp of Hache (courtesy title)
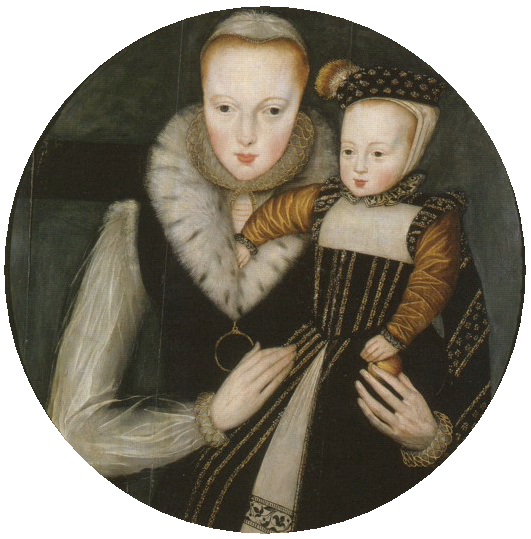
- Edward and his mother Lady Katherine Grey (circa 1562)
- Born: 21 September 1561; Tower of London
- Died: July 1612 (aged 50)
- Noble family: Seymour
- Spouse: Honora Rogers
- Issue: Edward Seymour, Lord Beauchamp; William Seymour, 2nd Duke of Somerset; Francis Seymour, 1st Baron Seymour of Trowbridge; Honora Seymour; Anne Seymour; Mary Seymour
- Father: Edward Seymour, 1st Earl of Hertford
- Mother: Lady Katherine Grey

Edward Seymour, Lord Beauchamp of Hache (21 September 1561 – July 1612) was an English nobleman who had a theoretically strong claim to the throne of England through his mother, Lady Katherine Grey, but his legitimacy was questioned. He was an ancestor of the dukes of Somerset.

== Origins ==
He was the son of Edward Seymour, 1st Earl of Hertford (1539–1621), by his wife Lady Katherine Grey (died 1568), a younger sister of Lady Jane Grey, "The Nine Days' Queen".

His grandfather was Edward Seymour, 1st Duke of Somerset (executed 1552), all of whose titles became forfeit on his attainder by the Parliament of England, during the reign of his nephew King Edward VI (reigned 1547–53). His father was, however, re-elevated to the peerage in 1559 by Queen Elizabeth I (1558–1603), as Baron Beauchamp of Hache and Earl of Hertford. During the lifetime of his father, whom he predeceased, he was known by the courtesy title (his father's lesser title) "Lord Beauchamp".

He was born in the Tower of London, where his mother had been imprisoned for secretly marrying his father against the wishes of Queen Elizabeth I. For many years, Edward was regarded as illegitimate because no proof could be produced of his parents' legal marriage.

== Claimant to throne ==
By 1603 Edward was the senior qualified heir under the will of King Henry VIII, which stipulated that the elder line of the Tudor dynasty, descended from Margaret Tudor, should be passed over in favour of the younger line, descended from Mary Tudor, the king's younger and favourite sister.

Edward's only possible rival under the will was Anne Stanley, Countess of Castlehaven, who would have been heir had Edward been considered illegitimate.

Regardless of Henry VIII's wishes, the succession progressed in favour of the elder line, which resulted in King James VI of Scotland ascending the English throne. Had the stipulations of the king's will been carried out, Edward would have become "King Edward VII" and England and Scotland would not have been placed under a personal union.

Queen Elizabeth I never officially dismissed her father's will, but James succeeded through the support of the English Parliament.

== Marriage and children ==
Edward married Honora Rogers, a daughter of Sir Richard Rogers (c. 1527 – 1605) of Bryanston, Dorset, a knight of the shire for Dorset in 1572, by his wife Cecilia Luttrell, daughter of Sir Andrew Luttrell (1484–1538), feudal baron of Dunster of Dunster Castle in Somerset. Honora was the sister of Andrew Rogers (died c. 1599), MP, of Bryanston, who earlier had married (as his second wife) Lord Beauchamp's aunt Lady Mary Seymour (born 1552). Beauchamp's father the earl was strongly opposed to the marriage and sent a certain George Ludlow to discuss the position with the Rogers family. Ludlow reported back that Honora was "a baggage" and her father Sir Richard Rogers "a fool" and that Lord Beauchamp had originally intended to have "but a night's lodging with her". The earl believed that Sir Richard had encouraged the marriage and that "though outwardly he did nothing" to oppose or promote the marriage, nevertheless his daughter had "inwardly his goodwill". By his wife Honora he had three sons and three daughters:

- Edward Seymour, Lord Beauchamp (1586–1618), who married Lady Anne Sackville, daughter of Robert Sackville, 2nd Earl of Dorset. He predeceased his grandfather the 1st Earl of Hertford and died without issue.
- William Seymour, 2nd Duke of Somerset (1588–1660) and 2nd Earl of Hertford, who in 1660 eventually regained the dukedom which had been granted to his great-grandfather Edward Seymour, 1st Duke of Somerset (c. 1500 – 1552)
- Francis Seymour, 1st Baron Seymour of Trowbridge (c. 1590 – 1664), of Marlborough Castle, the grandfather of Francis Seymour, 5th Duke of Somerset (1658–1678) and of his younger brother Charles Seymour, 6th Duke of Somerset (1662–1748), "The Proud Duke"
- Honora Seymour (bef. 1594 – 1620), wife of Sir Ferdinando Sutton, son of Edward Sutton, 5th Baron Dudley
- Anne Seymour
- Mary Seymour

== Death and succession ==
Arms of Seymour:Gules, two wings conjoined in lure or

Beauchamp predeceased his father, the 1st Earl of Hertford, and was succeeded in the courtesy title by his eldest son Edward Seymour, Lord Beauchamp (1586–1618), who also predeceased the 1st Earl.

It was thus his second son William Seymour who in 1621 succeeded his grandfather as Earl of Hertford and in 1660 was restored as 2nd Duke of Somerset.

His monumental brass inscription survives in Great Bedwyn church (the parish church of Wulfhall and Tottenham Lodge), inscribed in Latin:

Bellocamp(o) eram, Graia genetrice, Semerus. Tres habui natos, est quibus una soror ("I was Beauchamp, a Seymour, by my mother Grey. I have had three born from which one a sister")

== Ancestry ==
Ancestors of Edward Seymour, Lord Beauchamp

16. John Seymour
8. Sir John Seymour
17. Elizabeth Darell
4. Edward Seymour, 1st Duke of Somerset
18. Sir Henry Wentworth
9. Margery Wentworth
19. Anne Say
2. Edward Seymour, 1st Earl of Hertford
20. Thomas Stanhope
10. Sir Edward Stanhope
21. Margaret Jerningham
5. Anne Stanhope
22. Fulk Bourchier, 10th Baron FitzWarin
11. Elizabeth Bourchier
23. Elizabeth Dinham
1. Edward Seymour, Viscount Beauchamp
24. Thomas Grey, 1st Marquess of Dorset
12. Thomas Grey, 2nd Marquess of Dorset
25. Cecily Bonville, Baroness Harington and Bonville
6. Henry Grey, 1st Duke of Suffolk
26. Sir Robert Wotton
13. Margaret Wotton
27. Anne Belknap
3. Lady Katherine Grey
28. Sir William Brandon
14. Charles Brandon, 1st Duke of Suffolk
29. Elizabeth Bruyn
7. Lady Frances Brandon
30. Henry VII of England
15. Mary Tudor, Queen of France
31. Elizabeth of York
