= Skipwith (disambiguation) =

Skipwith is a village in Yorkshire.

Skipwith may also refer to:

== People ==
- Skipwith baronets, England

- Sir Grey Skipwith, 8th Baronet (1771–1852)

- Skipwith Cannell (1887–1957), American poet
- Fulwar Skipwith (1765–1839), American diplomat and politician
- Henry Skipwith (died 1588), Member of Parliament
- Henry Skipwith (born 1751), American politician
- Abraham Peyton Skipwith (died 1799), American freed black landowner
- Sofka Skipwith (1907–1994), Russian princess and social activist
- Thomas Skipwith (disambiguation)
- William Skipwith (disambiguation)

== Places ==
- Skipwith, Virginia, an unincorporated community in the US
- Skipwith Hall (disambiguation), several places
- Skipwith railway station, Skipwith, North Yorkshire, England
