= Anne Seymour =

Anne Seymour may refer to:

- Anne Seymour, Duchess of Somerset (1510–1587), née Stanhope, wife of the Lord Protector, Edward Seymour, 1st Duke of Somerset, and aunt of Edward VI of England
- Anne Seymour, Countess of Warwick (1538–1588), married name Anne Dudley, Countess of Warwick, poet and daughter of the above
- Anne Seymour Damer (1748–1828), English sculptor
- Anne Seymour (actress) (1909–1988), American film and television character actress
