= William Skipwith =

William Skipwith may refer to:

- William Skipwith (fl.1348), MP for York (UK Parliament constituency)
- William de Skipwith, important 15th century English judge.
- William Skipwith (died 1547), represented Lincolnshire in 1529 and 1539
- William Skipwith (died 1586), represented Lincolnshire in 1547
- William Skipwith (died c.1595), MP for St. Albans
- William Skipwith (died 1610), MP for Leicester and Leicestershire
