= Richard Page (courtier) =

English courtier

Sir Richard Page (died 1548) was an English courtier. He was a gentleman of the Privy Chamber at the court of King Henry VIII, and Vice-Chamberlain in the household of the king's illegitimate son, Henry FitzRoy. Page was imprisoned in the Tower of London in 1536 during the downfall of Anne Boleyn. He married Elizabeth Bourchier, the mother-in-law of the Protector Somerset

== Family ==
Richard Page's parentage is unknown. It is thought that he likely came from Surrey or Middlesex.

== Career ==
Page began his climb to prominence in the service Cardinal Thomas Wolsey, becoming Wolsey's chamberlain. By 1516 he had been knighted, and was a Gentleman of Henry VIII's Privy Chamber. In 1522 he was appointed a Justice of the Peace for Surrey, and in 1524 for Middlesex.

In 1525 Page was in Yorkshire, where he was a member of the Council of the North and vice-chamberlain, at £20 wages, in the household of Henry FitzRoy, illegitimate son of King Henry VIII. While in Henry Fitzroy's service, Page devised armorial bearings for the boy.

Page was a close associate of Anne Boleyn. He was appointed to the Privy Chamber in 1527, after publicly taking Anne's side against Cardinal Wolsey, then the King's chief minister.

He afterwards served as Captain of the King's Bodyguards, whilst enjoying the favours of the court, as a letter from Thomas Cromwell to Wolsey describes:

Mr. Page received your letter directed to my Lady Ann Boleyn and will deliver the same. She gave him kind words, but will not promise to speak to the King for you.

From 1527 to 1533 Page was Recorder of York. During his tenure as Recorder he was knighted on 3 November 1529 at the Palace of Whitehall, and received a gift of crest and arms quarterly on 1 February 1530 from Thomas Benolt.

On 8 May 1536, Page was arrested for treason and adultery with Queen Anne. Seven men were arrested and taken to the Tower of London, including Page. The others were Thomas Wyatt, Henry Norris, William Brereton, Francis Weston, Mark Smeaton and George Boleyn, Viscount Rochford. All except Page and Wyatt were found guilty and executed.

In a letter to Lord Lisle on 12 May 1536 John Hussey, 1st Baron Hussey of Sleaford describes the event:

Mr. Payge and Mr. W[y]at are in the tower, but it is thought without danger of life, though Mr. Payge is banished the King's court for ever.

Both Page and Wyatt were released from the Tower in June 1536 on the advice of Cromwell.

Though Page had been banished from court in disgrace, the King summoned him back, and he was made High Sheriff of Surrey in 1537. During the same year the King bestowed on Page the office of Chamberlain to his son, Prince Edward.

== Marriage and issue ==
In 1512 Page married Elizabeth Bourchier, daughter of Fulk Bourchier, 10th Baron FitzWarin and Elizabeth Dynham, by whom he had a daughter, Elizabeth Page (1516–1573), who married Sir William Skipwith (d. 17 October 1586) of Ormesby, only son and heir of Sir William Skipwith (d. 7 July 1547) by his first wife, Elizabeth Tyrwhit (died c.1515).

Before her marriage to Richard Page, Elizabeth Bourchier (d. 8 August 1557) had been the wife firstly of Henry Beaumont; secondly of a husband surnamed Verney, by whom she had a daughter, Katherine Verney; and thirdly of Sir Edward Stanhope (d. 6 June 1511), by whom she had a daughter, Anne Stanhope, who married Edward Seymour, 1st Duke of Somerset, uncle of King Edward VI.

Elizabeth Bourchier died 8 August 1557, and was buried at Clerkenwell, as noted in Machyn's diary.

After Page's death she married for the fifth and final time to Nicholas Pigot.
