= Thomas Skipwith =

Thomas Skipwith may refer to:

Skipwith baronets of Prestwould

- Sir Thomas George Skipwith, 9th Baronet (1803–1863)

Skipwith baronets of Newbold Hall

- Sir Thomas Skipwith, 4th Baronet (c. 1735-1790)

Skipwith baronets of Metheringham

- Sir Thomas Skipwith, 1st Baronet (c. 1620-1694)
- Sir Thomas Skipwith, 2nd Baronet (c. 1652-1710)

== See also ==
- Skipwith (disambiguation)
