= Margaret Seymour =

Margaret Seymour may refer to:

- Margery Wentworth, married name Margery or Margaret Seymour, mother of Queen Jane Seymour, third wife of Henry VIII and muse of the poet John Skelton
- Lady Margaret Seymour (writer), influential female writer and granddaughter of the above
- Margaret Seymour, Lady Wadham (died 1520), aunt of Queen Jane Seymour, wife of Sir Nicholas Wadham (died 1542), mother to Katherine and Jane Wadham, reluctant nuns at Romsey Abbey until the Dissolution of the Monasteries when both appear to have married and had issue.
- Margaret B. Seymour (born 1947), U.S. federal judge
