= Skipworth =

Skipworth is a surname.

Skipworth may refer to:

== People ==
- Alison Skipworth (1863–1952), English actress and wife of Frank Markham Skipworth
- A.H. Skipworth (1861-1907), English architect
- Frank Markham Skipworth (1854–1929), English painter and husband of Alison Skipworth
- Hayden Skipworth (born 1983), Australian rules footballer
- Kyle Skipworth (born 1990), American baseball player
- Lachlan Skipworth (born 1982), Australian composer
- Todd Skipworth (born 1985), Australian rower

== Groups ==
- Skipworth & Turner, an American male duo

== Places ==
- Skipworth's Addition, an American archaeological site

== See also ==
- Skipwith (disambiguation)
