= Christopher Rich =

Christopher Rich may refer to:

- Christopher Rich (theatre manager) (1657–1714), London theatre manager
- Christopher Rich (actor) (born 1953), American actor
