= Edward Seymour, 1st Earl of Hertford =

English nobleman (1539–1621)

Edward Seymour
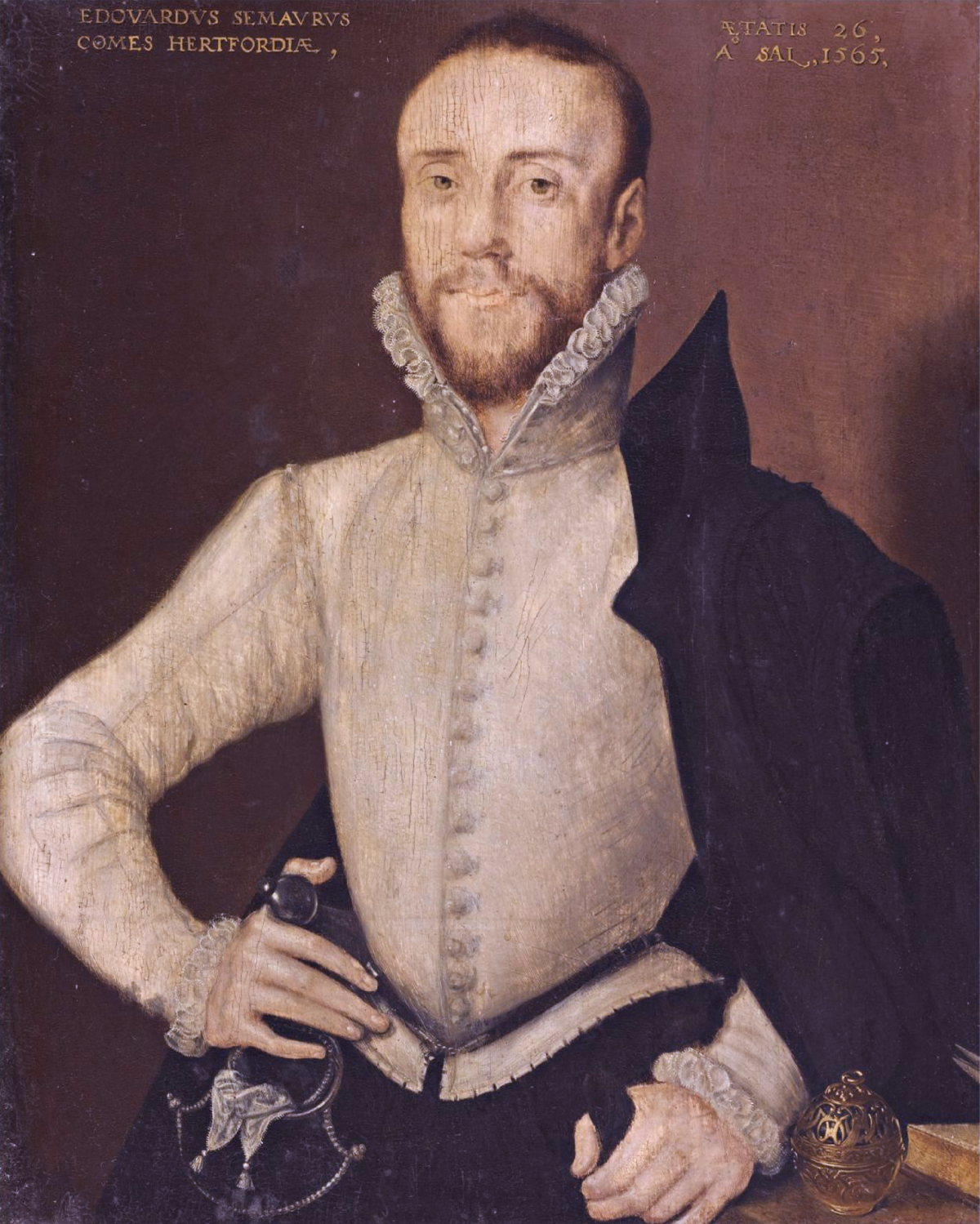
- Born: 22 May 1539
- Died: 6 April 1621 (aged 81)
- Title: 1st Earl of Hertford
- Spouse(s): Lady Katherine Grey (m. 1560; died 1568) Frances Howard (m. 1582–1598) Frances Prannell (née) Howard (m. 1601)
- Children: Edward Seymour, Lord Beauchamp; Thomas Seymour
- Parent(s): Edward Seymour, 1st Duke of Somerset; Anne Stanhope

Edward Seymour, 1st Earl of Hertford, 1st Baron Beauchamp, KG (22 May 1539 – 6 April 1621), of Wulfhall and Totnam Lodge in Great Bedwyn, Wiltshire, of Hatch Beauchamp in Somerset, of Netley Abbey, Hampshire, and of Hertford House, Cannon Row in Westminster, is most noted for incurring the displeasure of Queen Elizabeth I by taking part in more than one clandestine marriage.

== Early life ==
Seymour was the eldest son of Edward Seymour, 1st Duke of Somerset (c.1500 – 1552) by his second wife Anne Stanhope (c. 1511 – 1587). He was a nephew of Jane Seymour, the third wife of Henry VIII, and a first cousin of Edward VI. Although his father had sons by his first marriage to Catherine Fillol, these were postponed by special remainder to the succession of his dukedom behind the sons of his second marriage, due to her suspected adultery. The senior line did eventually inherit the dukedom in 1750, as the special remainder allowed, when the 7th Duke of Somerset died leaving no sons.

== Career ==
From 1547, when his father was created Duke of Somerset, his son Edward Seymour was styled by the duke's subsidiary title of Earl of Hertford. He was educated with the young Prince Edward, later Edward VI, and was knighted on the occasion of Edward's coronation.

On 7 April 1550, he was sent to France as a hostage, returning three weeks later. Following his father's disgrace and execution, his son was barred from inheriting his titles and most of his wealth. Some of his father's lands and property were restored to him by Edward VI, but he still seems to have been forced to rely on Sir John Thynne for some financial support. Under Queen Mary he was "restored in blood", but was not given back his title; Queen Elizabeth I created him Earl of Hertford, in the earldom's third creation, in 1559.

Between April and May 1605 following the Treaty of London (1604) he was sent on an Embassy by King James I to Albert VII, Archduke of Austria, sovereign of the Spanish Netherlands between 1598 and 1621, at Brussels, to receive his oath of peace.

== Clandestine marriages ==
=== Katherine Grey ===
His first wife, Lady Katherine Grey, was a potential claimant to Elizabeth's throne, and law established that it was a penal offence for her to marry without notifying the Sovereign. They were married by an anonymous clergyman at Hertford House in Cannon Row, Westminster, before 25 December 1560. The marriage was kept secret until August nearly a year later, when Katherine became visibly pregnant and she confided the reason to Lord Robert Dudley. Each was ordered to confinement in the Tower; Katherine was confined immediately, and Seymour imprisoned upon his return from a tour of the continent with Sir Thomas Cecil. While in custody, they were questioned about every aspect of their marriage, but they both claimed to have forgotten the date.

A commission was begun, headed by Archbishop Parker in February 1562. Under this pressure, Lady Katherine finally declared that they had waited for Elizabeth to quit the capital for Eltham Palace. Servants were questioned, and none of them could remember the exact date either. John Fortescue said it was 'in November'. The priest could not be located, but by consulting the accounts of the Cofferer of the Household the marriage date was decided to be 27 November.

His son Edward was declared illegitimate and the father was fined £15,000 (Note: about £6,100,000 today) in Star Chamber for "seducing a virgin of the blood royal."

Despite all this, the Earl apparently found a way to continue marital relations with his wife in the Tower. In February 1563, Thomas Seymour was born. Lady Katherine died in 1568, and Seymour was finally allowed out of the Tower and allowed to re-appear at court. Officially his sons remained bastards. In 1576 he carried the sword of state at Elizabeth's procession of the knights of the garter.

==== Children by Katherine Grey ====
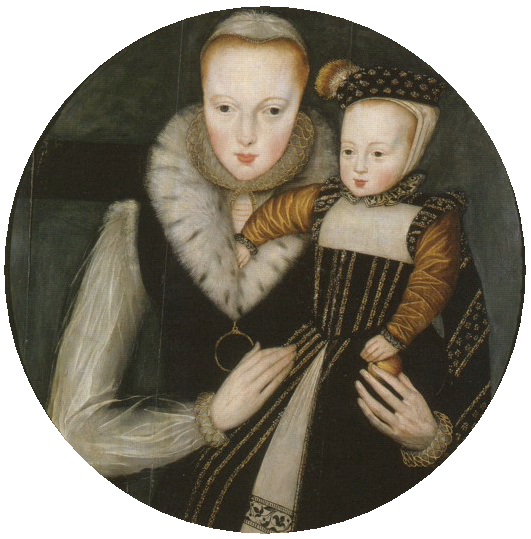
Lady Katherine Grey with her elder son Edward, Lord Beauchamp

- Edward Seymour, Lord Beauchamp (1561–1612), eldest son and heir, born in the Tower of London. He predeceased his father, having married Honora Rogers and had sons including his eldest surviving son William Seymour, 2nd Duke of Somerset (1587–1660), restored in 1660 on the Restoration of the Monarchy to the Dukedom forfeited on the attainder of the 1st Duke in 1552. The 2nd Duke, like his grandfather, was imprisoned for marrying in secret to a wife with royal blood, namely Arbella Stuart. His monumental brass inscription survives in Great Bedwyn Church, inscribed in Latin:

Bellocamp[o] eram, Graia genetrice, Semerus. Tres habui natos, est quibus una soror
("I was Beauchamp, a Seymour, by my mother Grey. I have had three born of which one a sister")

- Thomas Seymour (c.1563–1600), 2nd son, born in the Tower of London, who also predeceased his father and died childless, having married Isabell Onley (d.1619), daughter of Edward Onley (1522–1582), Esquire, (Latinized to Unleius, genitive Unleii on his father's monument in Salisbury Cathedral) of Catesby in Northamptonshire, MP for Brackley in 1563. Thomas's mural monument, possibly by the sculptor Epiphanius Evesham, survives in St Margaret's Church, Westminster (his father's townhouse, Hertford House, was in Cannon Row, Westminster), showing kneeling effigies of himself and his wife, inscribed as follows:

Here in peace resteth ye bodyes of Thomas Seymour, second sone to ye right honourable Edward, Earle of Hartford, and Esable his wife, eldest daughter to Edward Onley of Katesby in ye county of Northampton Esq., wh[ich] said Thomas departed this mortall life ye eight day of August 1600 & ye said Esable ye twen(tie)th day of August 1619 in ye true faith of Jesus Christ & in ye blesse[d] hope of a joyfull resurection.

=== Frances Howard ===
Frances Howard, daughter of William Howard, 1st Baron Howard of Effingham, was a gentlewoman of the Privy Chamber. In May 1573 she and her sister Douglas, Lady Sheffield were said to be rivals for the affections of the Earl of Leicester.

In 1582, she married Hertford. Their union was in secret, and remained so for nearly a decade, while Frances continued at court. Hertford attempted to have this marriage set aside in 1595 (hoping to clear his still illegitimate sons' claim to the throne). He was arrested again, and Frances died in 1598. She was buried in Westminster Abbey.

=== Frances Prannell ===
In May 1601, he secretly married once more, to the wealthy widow Frances Prannell, also born Frances Howard, the daughter of Thomas Howard, 1st Viscount Howard of Bindon. The marriage was performed by Rev. Thomas Montfort without banns or licence, for which Montfort was suspended for three years by Archbishop John Whitgift.

== Residences and landholdings ==
His principal seats were as follows:

- Wulfhall in Great Bedwyn, Wiltshire, inherited from his father. Abandoned in favour of nearby Tottenham House.
- Tottenham House in Great Bedwyn, Wiltshire, which he built.
- Hatch Beauchamp in Somerset, the ancient seat of his ancestors Barons Beauchamp of Hatch.
- Netley Abbey, Hampshire, which he purchased in 1602 from William Paulet, 4th Marquess of Winchester (c.1560–1629) of Basing House, Hampshire. He died there in 1621.
- Hertford House, Cannon Row in Westminster, townhouse.

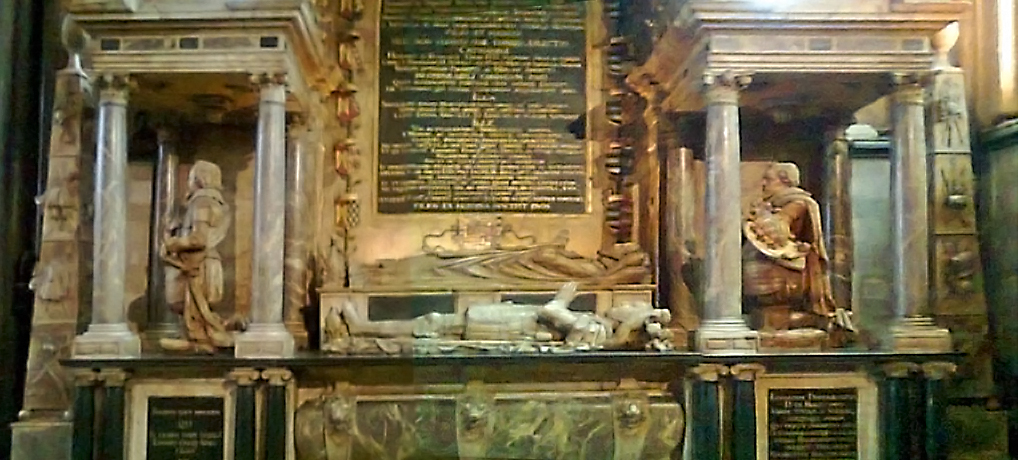
Detail of monument to Edward Seymour in Salisbury Cathedral

== Arms ==
Paternal arms of Edward Seymour

The arms of Edward Seymour, 1st Duke of Somerset (died 1552), quartered the original arms of the head of the family with a new grant of arms from his nephew King Edward VI.

== Death and burial ==
Lord Hertford died in 1621 at Netley Abbey, Hampshire, and was buried in the Seymour Chapel of Salisbury Cathedral in Wiltshire, where his elaborate monument in white alabaster with effigies of himself and his first wife survives. (Note: For description of his monument and inscription see: Harris, James, Copies of the Epitaphs in Salisbury Cathedral, Salisbury, 1825,)

== Sources ==
- "Seymour, Edward (1539?-1621)" . Dictionary of National Biography. London: Smith, Elder & Co. 1885–1900.
- Haynes, Alan. Sex in Elizabethan England. Gloucestershire: Sutton Publishing Limited, 1997. ISBN 0-905778-35-9
- The Earl of Hertford's Lieutenancy Papers, 1603–1612, ed. W. P. D. Murphy, (Wiltshire Record Society vol. 23, 1969)

Political offices
Preceded by Henry Herbert, 2nd Earl of Pembroke	Lord Lieutenant of Somerset and Wiltshire; 1601–1621	Succeeded by William Herbert, 3rd Earl of Pembroke
Preceded by Henry Herbert, 2nd Earl of Pembroke	Custos Rotulorum of Wiltshire; 1601–1621	Succeeded by Sir Francis Seymour
Peerage of England
New creation	Earl of Hertford; 1559–1621	Succeeded by William Seymour
