= Sir Thomas Skipwith, 1st Baronet =

English politician

Sir Thomas Skipwith, 1st Baronet (ca. 1620 – 2 June 1694) was an English politician who sat in the House of Commons in 1659 and 1660.

Skipwith was the son of Edward Skipwith of Gosburton and Grantham and his wife Elizabeth Hatcher, daughter of Sir John Hatcher of Coteby, Lincolnshire. His father was the illegitimate son of William Skipwith, a Member of Parliament for Lincolnshire, and Anne Tothby.

In 1659, Skipwith was elected a Member of Parliament for Grantham in the Third Protectorate Parliament. He was re-elected in 1660, as MP for Grantham in the Convention Parliament. He was knighted at Whitehall on 29 May 1673, made Serjeant-at-law on 21 April 1675, and was created baronet of Metheringham on 27 July 1678.

Skipwith died at his house in Lincoln's Inn Fields in June 1694.

Skipwith married firstly Elizabeth Lathom daughter of Ralph Lathom of Upminster, Essex. Their son Thomas succeeded to the baronetcy, and his daughter Susan married Sir John Williams, 1st Baronet of Minster. He married secondly Elizabeth Maddison, widow of Edward Maddison and daughter of Sir John Rea, but had no further children.

Parliament of England
Preceded by William Ellys	Member of Parliament for Grantham; 1659; With: Sir William Ellys	Succeeded by Not represented in restored Rump
Baronetage of England
New creation	Baronet (of Metheringham); 1678–1694	Succeeded by Thomas Skipwith
