= Hecatodistichon =

- by Jane, Anne, and Margaret Seymour
- Country: France
- Language: Latin
- Genre: Encomium
- Form: Couplets
- Publisher: Nicolas Denisot
- Publication date: 1550
- Lines: 104

Hecatodistichon was a poem written in 1550 by the Seymour sisters, Jane, Anne and Margaret. It was England's first female-authored encomium, the only work by Englishwomen published in Latin in the 16th century, and the only work by any Englishwomen published in any language before the 1560s.

It was written on the death of Marguerite de Navarre, sister of the French king and queen of Navarre.

It comprised 104 distichs, or couplets. Hecato is a prefix from the Greek word for "hundred".

The Hecatodistichon was published in Paris in 1550 by the sisters' tutor, Nicolas Denisot. It was republished in 2000 in the series The early modern Englishwoman by Ashgate Publishing, Aldershot (ISBN 1840142197).
