= St Helen's Church, Skipwith =

Church in Skipwith, North Yorkshire, England

Coordinates: 53.8387°N 1.0027°W

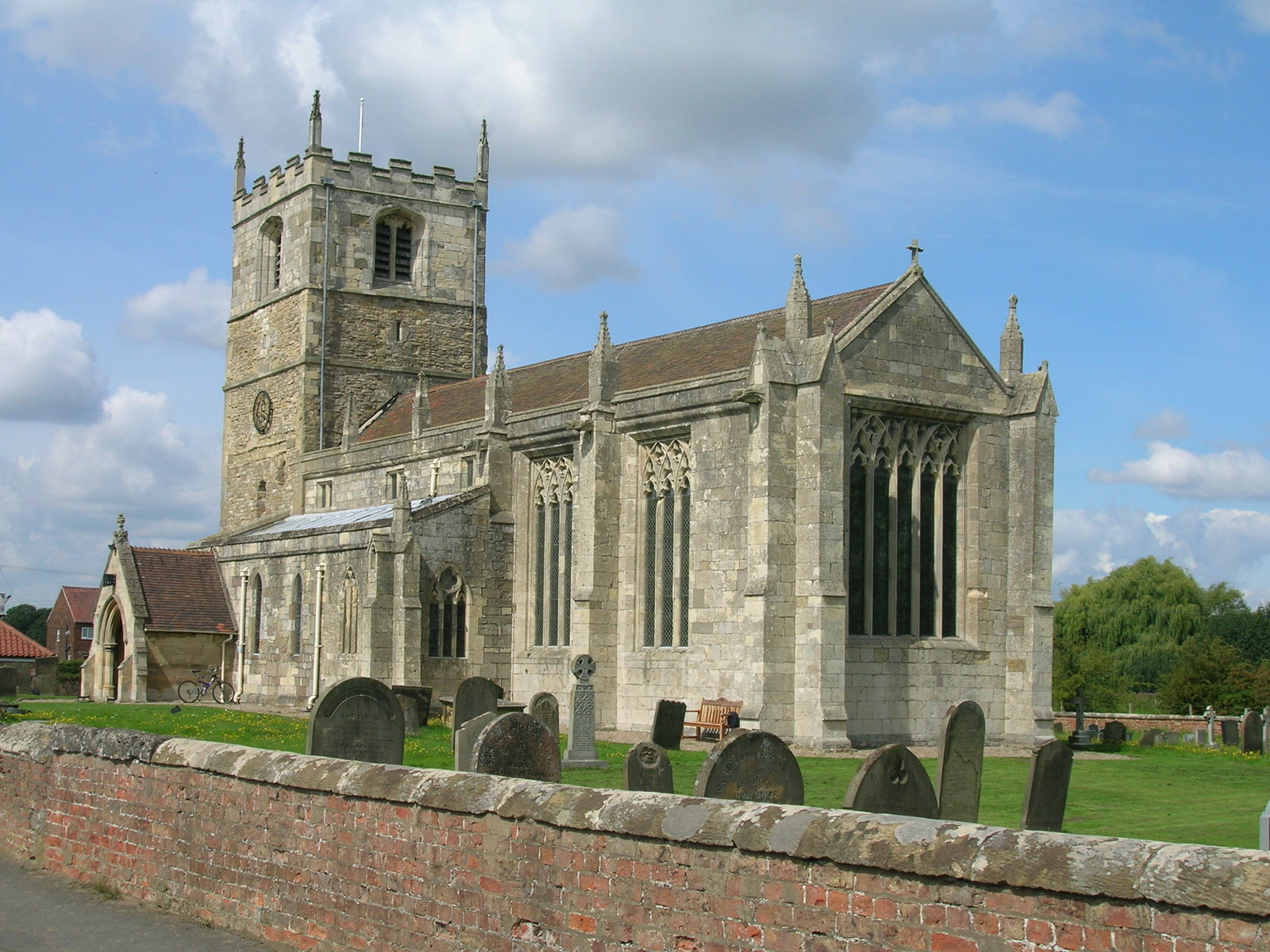
The building, in 2011

St Helen's Church is the parish church of Skipwith, a village in North Yorkshire, in England.

Remains of a 7th- or 8th-century building have been identified at the site, which may represent an earlier church. The oldest part of the current building was constructed in about 950 of probably Roman stone, and originally formed the church porch. In the 11th century, another stage was added over it, to form a tower, and the nave was rebuilt. The church was given to the Bishop of Durham in 1084, and in the 12th century passed to Durham Priory. A two-bay north aisle was constructed in about 1190. In the 13th century, it was extended east by a further bay. The south aisle and chancel date from about 1300. In the 15th century the tower was raised again with the addition of a new bell-stage. In the early 16th century, the north aisle windows were rebuilt, followed later in the century by the construction of a clerestory. A south porch was added between 1821 and 1822, then the building was restored in 1877 by J. L. Pearson. The building was grade I listed in 1966. Nikolaus Pevsner praises it as a "fine church" with "one of the most noble chancels of the [former] East Riding".

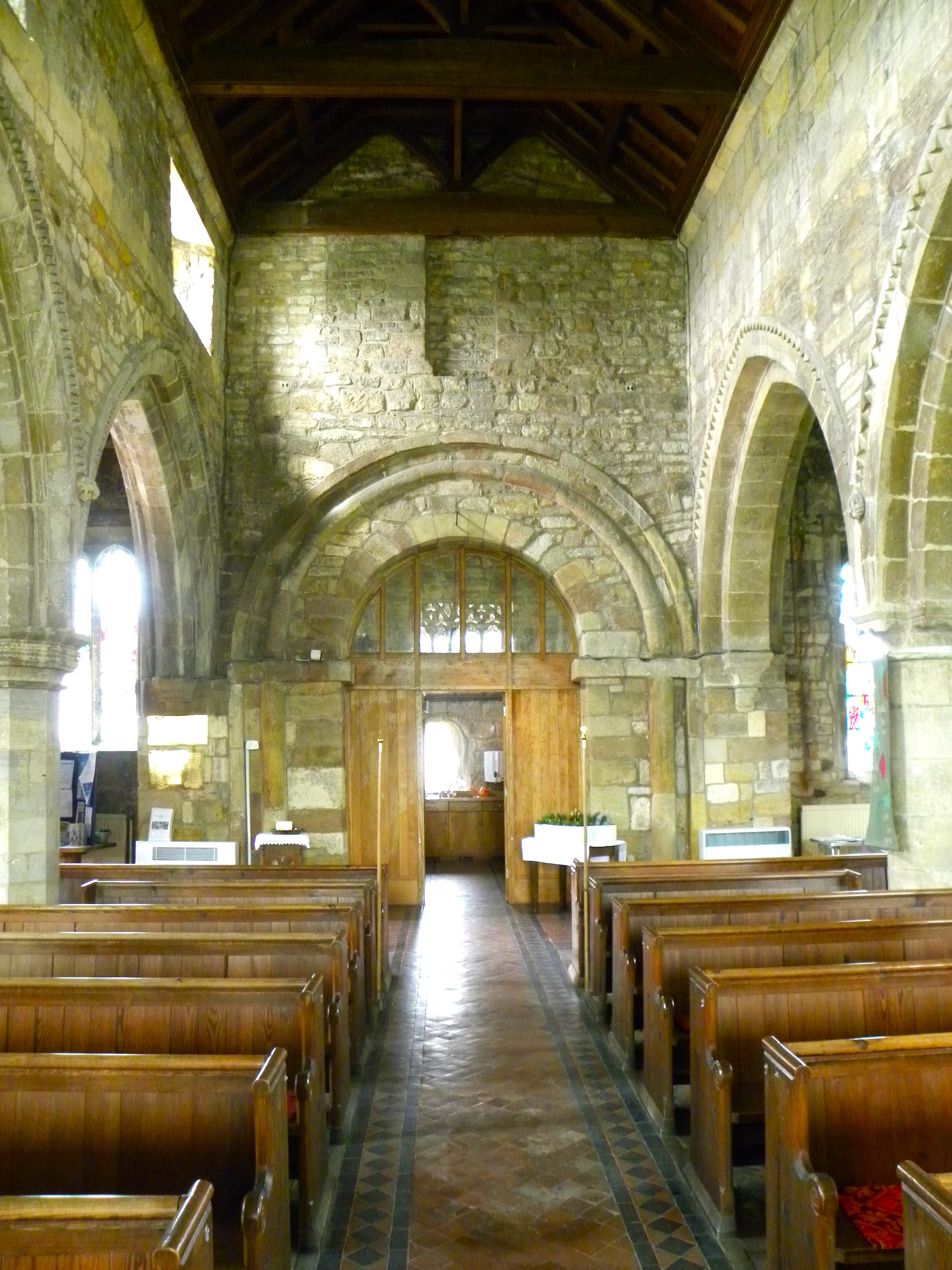
The nave and tower arch

The church is built of magnesian limestone with a tile roof, and consists of a nave with a clerestory, north and south aisles, a south porch, a chancel and a west tower. The tower has three stages, quoins, bands, slit windows, a south clock face, two-light bell openings with trefoil heads, and an embattled parapet with corner pinnacles. Inside, the tower has a characteristic Saxon plain Romanesque round arch. The church door has 13th-century ironwork, and there is a square alms box on a pedestal, which is dated 1615. There is a 15th-century screen to the north aisle chapel. There is assorted 14th-century stained glass, along with a 17th-century window depicting King David, and eight windows with glass designed in the 1950s by Gerald Edward Roberts Smith.

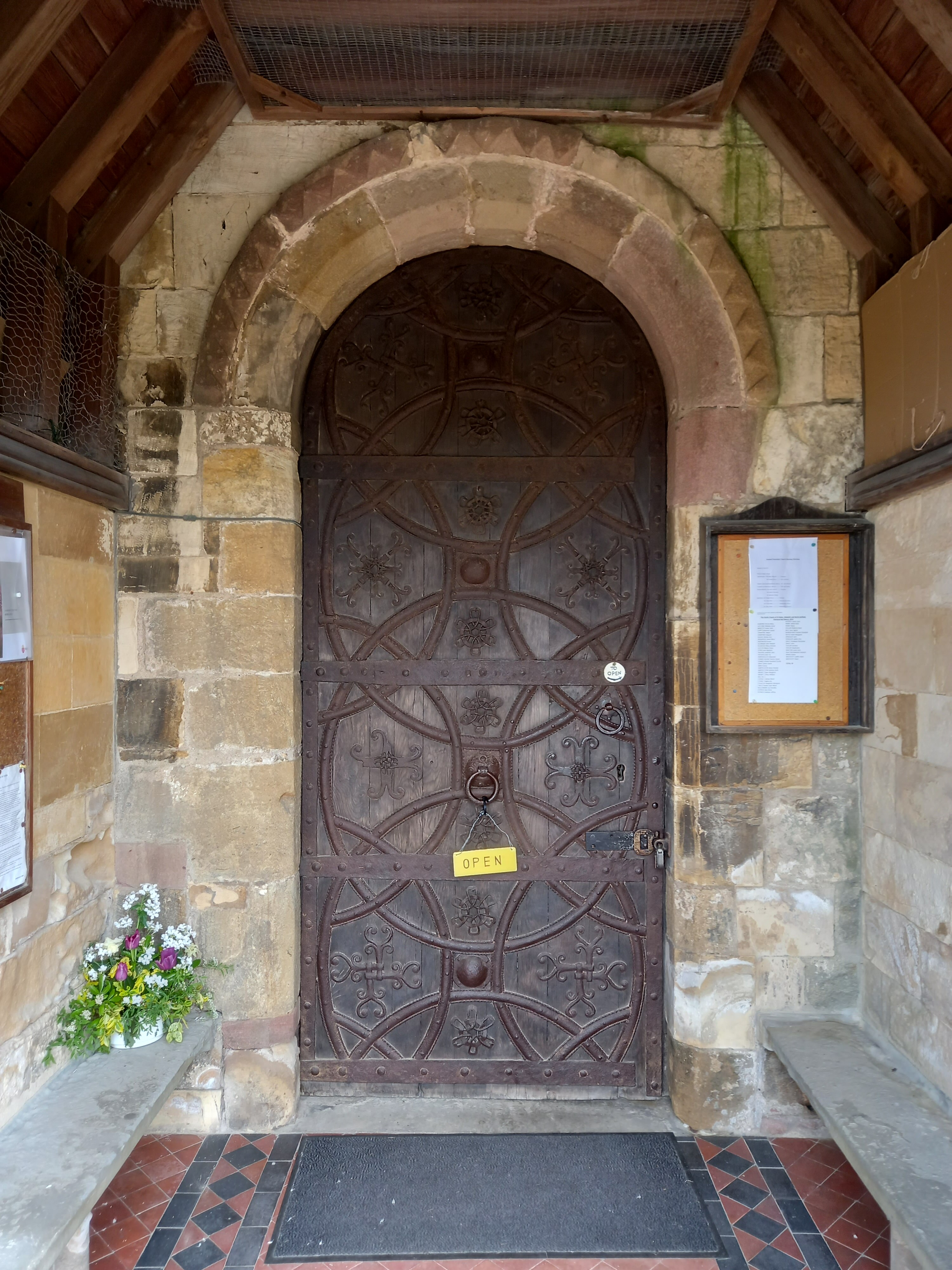
The doorway

The tower has an Anglo-Scandinavian stone, which may have been carved in place, depicting humans and animals in a scene which has been interpreted as Ragnarok. There is a further stone with a carving of a bear, which may also be pre-Norman Conquest.

== See also ==
- Grade I listed buildings in North Yorkshire (district)
- Listed buildings in Skipwith
