= John Bourchier, 1st Earl of Bath =

English noble

Arms of Bourchier: Argent, a cross engrailed gules between four water bougets sable

John Bourchier, 1st Earl of Bath (20 July 1470 – 30 April 1539) was created Earl of Bath in 1536. He was the feudal baron of Bampton in Devon.

== Origins ==
Bourchier was born in Essex, England, the eldest son and heir of Fulk Bourchier, Baron Fitzwarin (d. 18 September 1479) by his wife Elizabeth Dynham, second daughter and co-heiress of John Dynham, Baron Dynham. He was the brother of Elizabeth Bourchier.

== Marriages ==
Bourchier married three times. His first wife was Cecily Daubeny, the daughter of Giles Daubeny, 8th Baron Daubeny and Elizabeth Arundell, the daughter of John Arundell of Lanherne, Cornwall. They had eight children. His second wife was Florence Bonville, widow of Humphrey Fulford, and daughter and coheir of John Bonville and Katharine Wingfield, the daughter of Robert Wingfield. His third wife was Elizabeth Wentworth, widow of Roger Darcy and Thomas Wyndham. She was the daughter of Henry Wentworth of Nettlestead and Anne Say, the daughter of John Say.

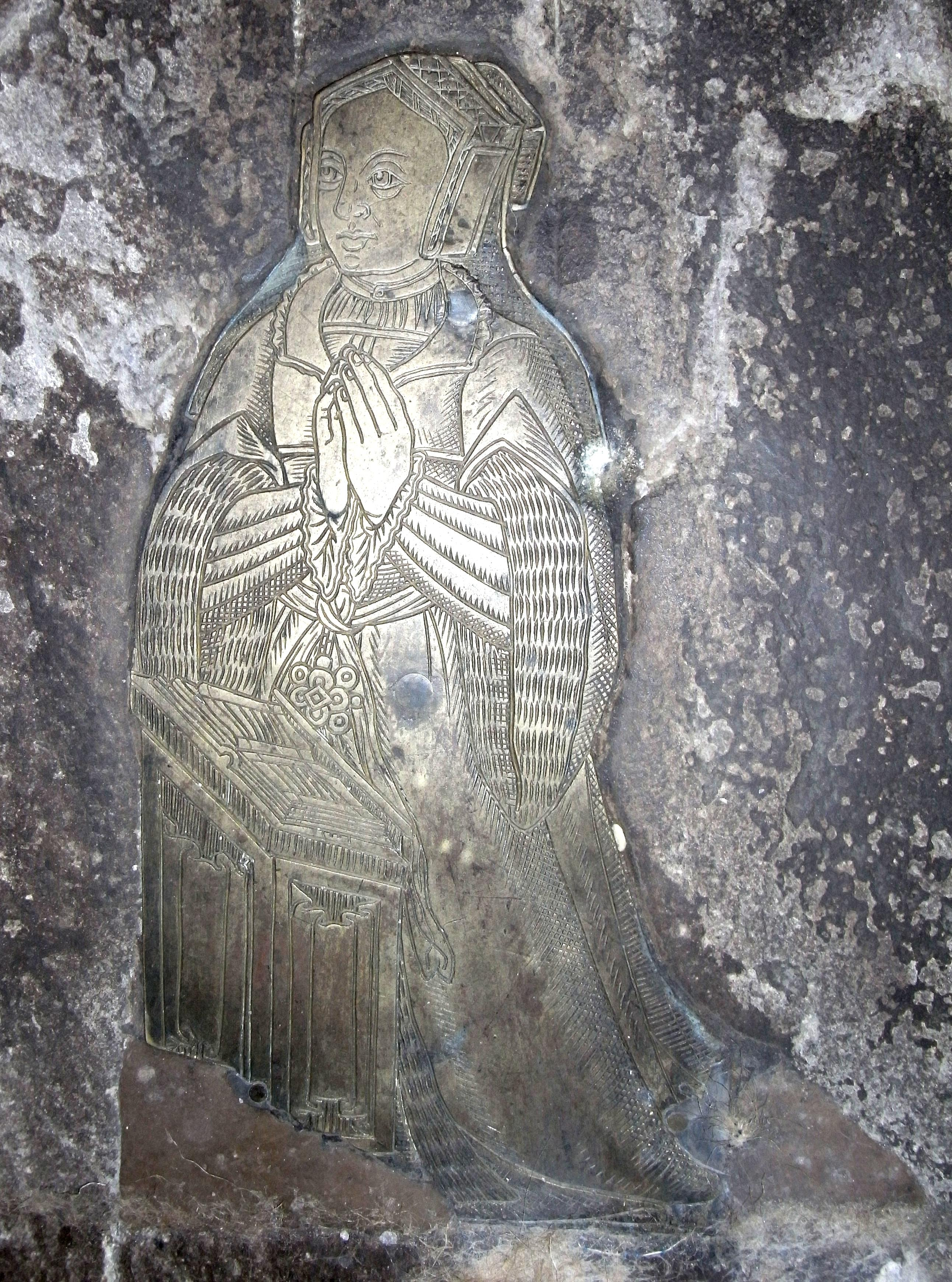
Small monumental brass in St Brannock's Church, Braunton, Devon, of Elizabeth Bourchier, daughter of John Bourchier. She kneels at prayer before a prie dieu which displays an open book

With his first wife, Bourchier's heir was John Bourchier, who became the next earl. His other children from his first marriage were Elizabeth who married Edward Chichester, Amias, Dorothy who married John Fulford, Giles, Margaret or Margery, Anne, and Eleanor. Margery, a daughter of Lord Fitzwaren, was an attendant at the Field of the Cloth of Gold.

== Death and burial ==
Bourchier was buried in Bampton Church in Devon, where he had endowed a chantry. Although part of an elaborate chest tomb survives in the church, according to Nikolaus Pevsner it belong's to Bourchier's grandmother Thomasine Hankford, wife of William Bourchier. The first earl's tomb, which was destroyed sometime after 1770, was situated in the north aisle of Bampton Church and showed effigies of himself and his wife Cecily Daubeny with their eight children.

== Notes ==
Peerage of England
New creation	Earl of Bath; 1536–1539	Succeeded by John Bourchier
Preceded by Fulk Bourchier	Baron FitzWarin; 1479–1539	Succeeded by John Bourchier
