= Skipwith Hall =

Skipwith Hall is the name of:

- Skipwith Hall, North Yorkshire, in Skipwith, England
- Skipwith Hall (Tennessee), in the United States
