= Listed buildings in Skipwith =

Skipwith is a civil parish in the county of North Yorkshire, England. It contains four listed buildings that are recorded in the National Heritage List for England. Of these, one is listed at Grade I, the highest of the three grades, one is at Grade II*, the middle grade, and the others are at Grade II, the lowest grade. The parish contains the village of Skipwith and the surrounding area. All the listed buildings are in the village, and consist of a church, a war memorial in the churchyard, a house, and a former school and master's house.

== Key ==
Grade	Criteria
I	Buildings of exceptional interest, sometimes considered to be internationally important
II*	Particularly important buildings of more than special interest
II	Buildings of national importance and special interest

== Buildings ==
Name and location	Photograph	Date	Notes	Grade
St Helen's Church; 53.83867°N 1.00262°W		Anglo-Saxon	The oldest part of the church is the base of the tower, and the church has since been extended and altered, including a restoration in 1877 by J. L. Pearson. It is built in magnesian limestone with a tile roof, and consists of a nave with a clerestory, north and south aisles, a south porch, a chancel and a west tower. The tower has three stages, quoins, bands, slit windows, a south clock face, two-light bell openings with trefoil heads, and an embattled parapet with corner pinnacles.	I
Skipwith Hall; 53.83876°N 0.99896°W		c. 1725	The house is in pinkish-brown brick, with dressings in red brick and stone, floor bands, a parapet, and a Welsh slate roof. There are three storeys and seven bays, and flanking two-storey three-bay wings. The central doorway has an eared architrave, a fanlight and a keystone, and the window above also has an eared architrave and a keystone. The windows are sashes, those in the top floor of the main block are horizontally sliding, and all have flat red brick arches.	II*
Village Hall and School House; 53.84047°N 0.99403°W		Early 19th century (possible)	A school and schoolmaster's house later used for other purposes, in pinkish-orange brick, partly whitewashed and partly rendered, with a dentilled eaves band and a swept pantile roof. There are two storeys and five bays, and a rear outshut. On the front is a gabled porch, and a doorway with a divided fanlight. The windows are sashes with cambered heads, and on the front is an inscribed plaque.	II
War memorial 53.83851°N 1.00282°W		1923	The war memorial is in the churchyard of St Helen's Church, it is in Scottish silver granite, and is about 2.4 metres (7 ft 10 in) in height. The memorial consists of a wheel head cross on a tapering shaft with Celtic knot work decoration on the front, on a tapering plinth, on a base of two rectangular steps. On the eastern face and on the plinth are inscriptions and the names of those lost in the two World Wars..	II
