= Lady Jane Seymour =

English writer

- Born: c.1541
- Died: 19 March 1561 (aged 19–20)
- Father: Edward Seymour, 1st Duke of Somerset
- Mother: Anne Stanhope

Lady Jane Seymour (c.1541 – 19 March 1561) was a writer during the sixteenth century in England, along with her sisters, Lady Margaret Seymour and Anne Seymour, Countess of Warwick. They were the children of Edward Seymour, 1st Duke of Somerset, who from 1547 was the Lord Protector of England after the death of King Henry VIII and during the minority of Jane's first cousin, King Edward VI. She was baptised 22 February 1541, her godmothers were Lady Mary (the King's daughter, at the time declared illegitimate but later to become queen) and Katherine Howard, the fifth wife of Henry VIII, and queen at the time. Some sources say that Thomas Cromwell was her godfather, but this cannot be correct as he had been executed the year before. Jane was thus the niece of Henry VIII's third wife, Queen Jane, whom she was probably named after. She was the sole witness to the secret marriage of her brother Edward to Lady Katherine Grey (a potential heir to Queen Elizabeth I) in 1560.

The Seymour sisters' literary ambitions can be traced back to their childhood where they received a humanist education. During their upbringing the sisters were tutored by a John Crane and by Nicholas Denisot a French humanist and Pléiade poet in French and Latin. From an early age, their literary ambitions were known to everyone, letters such as one that Margaret and Jane wrote to their cousin Edward VI, thanking him for his 'literary gift' and a letter that Jane wrote in Latin thanking Bucer and Fagius for sending her and her sisters books help further prove their literary ambitions. As they grew older, the three sisters tended to work together, with their most famous work being a collection of 103 Latin distichs, Hecatodistichon, for the tomb of Margaret of Valois, queen of Navarre and also an author, which was published in 1550.

Jane Seymour died in 1561, aged 20, probably of tuberculosis. She was buried at Westminster Abbey on 26 March.
