= Duchess of Richmond =

Wife of the Duke of Richmond

- Incumbent; Janet Gordon-Lennox since 1 September 2017
- Style: Her Grace
- Member of: Gordon-Lennox family
- Term length: As long as married to the Duke of Richmond
- Formation: 1525 (first creation)
- First holder: Mary Fitzroy

The Duchess of Richmond is the wife of the Duke of Richmond, an extant title in the Peerage of England that has been created four times, originally in 1525.

== Countesses ==
=== Countesses of Richmond (1218–1235) ===
Other titles: Duchess of Brittany

Countess	Image	Earl	Tenure
Alix, Duchess of Brittany		1st	1218–1221
Nicole		1st	Unknown-1232

=== Countesses of Richmond (1341–1342) ===
Other titles: Countess of Beaumont

Countess	Image	Earl	Tenure
Joan of Valois		1st	1341–1342

=== Countesses of Richmond (1342–1372) ===
Other titles: Duchess of Lancaster

Countess	Image	Earl	Tenure
Blanche of Lancaster		1st	1359–1368
Katherine Swynford		1st	1371–1372

=== Countesses of Richmond (1372–1425) ===
Other titles: Duchess of Brittany

Countess	Image	Earl	Tenure
Joan Holland		5th	1372–1384
Joan of Navarre		5th	1386–1399

=== Countesses of Richmond (1414–1435) ===
Other titles: Duchess of Bedford

Countess	Image	Earl	Tenure
Anne of Burgundy		1st	1423–1432
Jacquetta of Luxembourg		1st	1433–1435

=== Countesses of Richmond (1452–1509) ===
Countess	Image	Earl	Tenure
Margaret Beaufort		1st	1455–1456

== Duchesses ==
=== Duchesses of Richmond & Somerset (1525–1536) ===
Duchess	Image	Duke	Tenure
Mary Howard		1st	1533–1536

=== Duchesses of Richmond (1623–1624) ===
Duchess	Image	Duke	Tenure
Frances Howard		1st	1623–1624

=== Duchesses of Richmond (1641–1672) ===
Duchess	Image	Duke	Tenure
Mary Villiers		1st	1641–1655
Elizabeth Rogers		3rd	1659–Unknown
Margaret Lewis (née Banastre)		3rd	1662–Unknown
Frances Stuart		3rd	1667–1672

=== Duchesses of Richmond (1675–Present) ===
Duchess	Image	Duke	Tenure	Ref.
Anne Brudenell		1st	1692–1722	
Sarah Cadogan		2nd	1723–1750	
Mary Bruce		3rd	1757–1796	
Charlotte Lennox		4th	1789–1819	
Caroline Paget		5th	1819–1860	
Frances Greville		6th	1860–1887	
Hilda Brassey		8th	1928–1935	
Elizabeth Hudson		9th	1935–1989	
Susan Grenville-Grey		10th	1989–2017	
Janet Astor		11th	2017–present	
