= Elizabeth Bourchier (died 1557) =

English noblewoman

- Born: before 1473
- Died: 8 August 1557
- Buried: Clerkenwell
- Noble family: Bourchier
- Spouse: Edward Chichester
- Issue: Katherine Verney; Anne Seymour, Duchess of Somerset; Elizabeth Page, Lady Skipworth
- Father: Fulk Bourchier, 10th Baron FitzWarin
- Mother: Elizabeth Dynham

Elizabeth Bourchier (before 1473 – 8 August 1557) was an English noblewoman. She was, by her third husband, Sir Edward Stanhope, the mother of Anne Stanhope, wife of the Protector Somerset. Her fourth husband was the courtier Sir Richard Page. She died in 1557, and was buried at Clerkenwell.

== Life ==
Elizabeth Bourchier (before 1473 – 8 August 1557) was daughter of Fulk Bourchier, 10th Baron FitzWarin (25 October 1445 – 18 September 1479).

Elizabeth Bourchier's mother was Elizabeth Dynham (d. 19 October 1516). She was the daughter of Sir John Dynham (d. 25 January 1458) by Joan Arches (d.1497), and the sister and coheir of John Dynham, 1st Baron Dynham (d. 1501). After the death of her first husband, Fulk Bourchier, she married Sir John Sapcotes (d.1501) of Elton, Huntingdonshire, and after his death, Sir Thomas Brandon (d. 27 January 1510) of Duddington, Northamptonshire. There were no issue of Elizabeth Dynham's marriage to Thomas Brandon, and according to Gunn, after his death she took a vow of celibacy before Bishop Fisher on 21 April 1510. She died 19 October 1516, and was buried in the Greyfriars, London.

Elizabeth Bourchier had two siblings, John Bourchier, 1st Earl of Bath (d. 30 April 1539), and Joan Bourchier (d. 3 March 1532), second wife of James Tuchet, 7th Baron Audley, who was beheaded 28 June 1497 on Tower Hill for his part in the Cornish rebellion.

Elizabeth Bourchier married firstly Henry Beaumont, and secondly a husband surnamed Verney, by whom she had a daughter, Katherine Verney. Her third husband was Sir Edward Stanhope (d. 6 June 1511) of Rampton, Nottinghamshire. Stanhope had earlier been married to Adelina Clifton, the daughter of Sir Gervase Clifton, of Clifton, Nottinghamshire, by whom he had two sons, Richard Stanhope (d. 21 January 1529), who married Anne Strelley (d. 12 October 1554), and Sir Michael Stanhope, who married Anne Rawson. Sir Edward Stanhope fought in 1487 at the Battle of Stoke and in 1497 at the Battle of Blackheath, where he was knighted on the field for his valour. He was a Knight of the Body and Constable of Sandal Castle. Elizabeth Bourchier's stepson, Sir Michael Stanhope, was beheaded on Tower Hill on 26 February 1552.

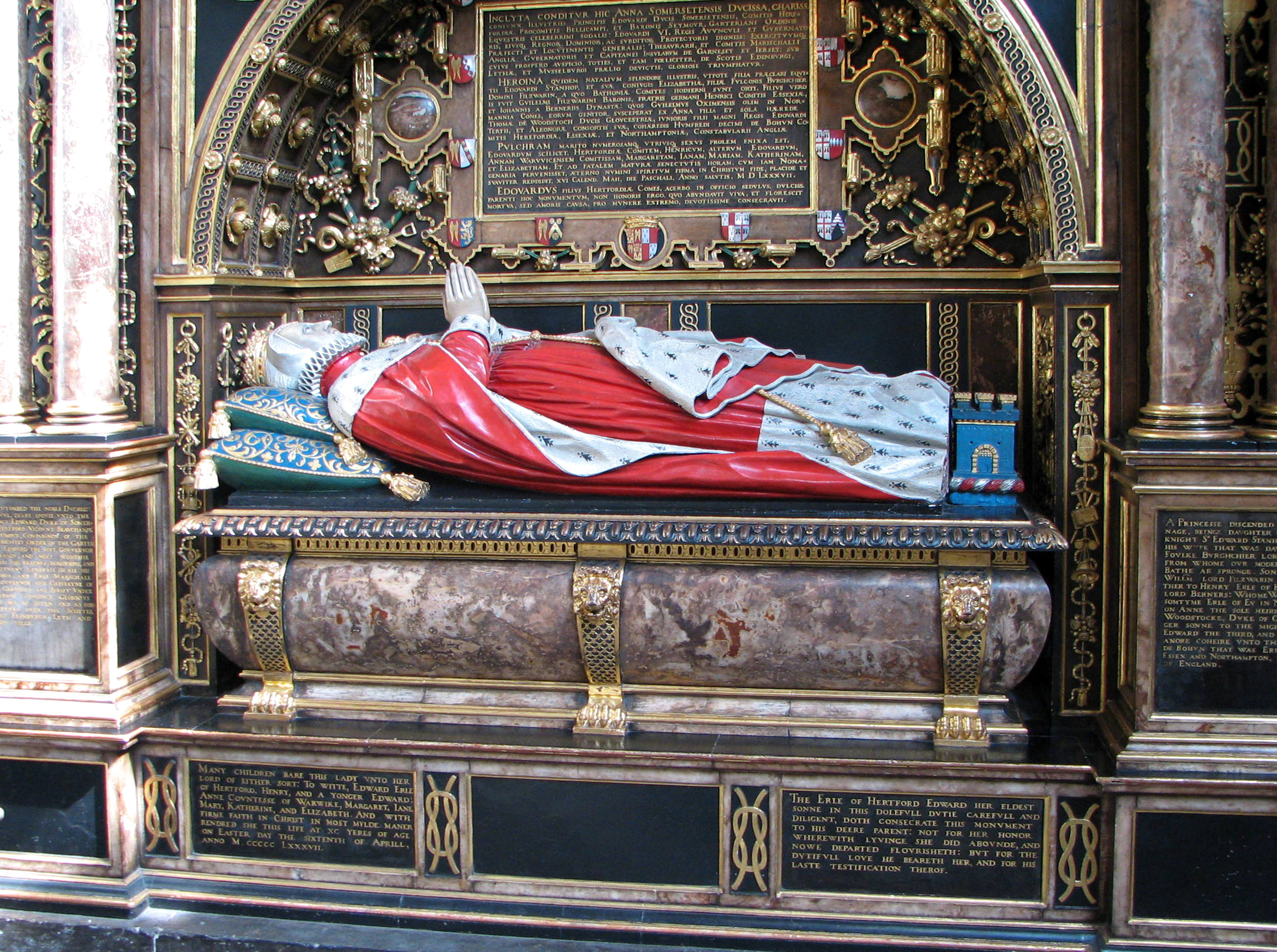
Monument to Elizabeth Bourchier's daughter, Anne Stanhope, in Westminster Abbey

By Sir Edward Stanhope Elizabeth Bourchier had a daughter, Anne Stanhope, who married, as his second wife, Edward Seymour, 1st Duke of Somerset. Elizabeth Bourchier's son-in-law, Somerset, was beheaded on Tower Hill on 22 January 1552.

After the death of Sir Edward Stanhope, Elizabeth Bourchier married her fourth husband, the courtier Sir Richard Page, by whom she had a daughter, Elizabeth Page, who married Sir William Skipwith. In the month of June 1537, Lady Page's servant is recorded as having received two shillings as a reward for bringing strawberries and cream to the future Queen Mary. When her daughter, Anne Seymour, Duchess of Somerset, was imprisoned in the Tower of London in 1552, her mother Elizabeth, then styled Lady Page, was granted permission to visit her.

Elizabeth Bourchier died 8 August 1557, and was buried at Clerkenwell, as noted in Machyn's diary.
