= Canon Row =

Street in London, England

Coordinates: 51.50160°N 0.12546°W

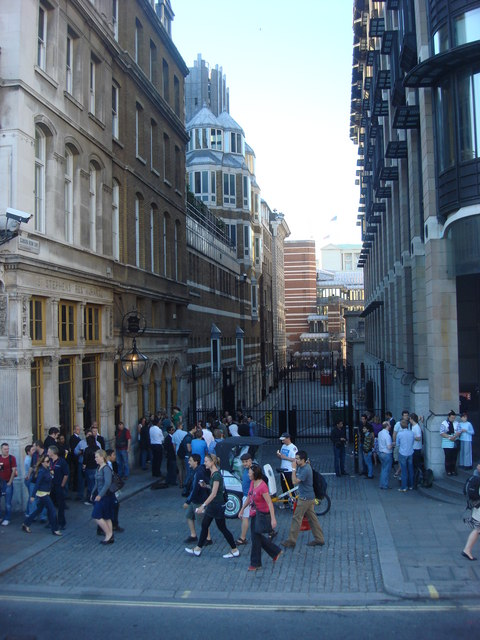
Canon Row in 2009

Canon Row is a historic street in the City of Westminster in London. It is best known as the location of Canon Row Police Station.

== History ==
In 1878 Canon Row extended from the back of Richmond Terrace to Bridge Street, Westminster, and about midway between the Thames and Parliament Street. It is a narrow thoroughfare.

According to John Stow and John Selden, Canon Row — or, as it was often called, Channel Row — derived its name from being the residence allotted to the Canons of St Stephen's Chapel in the Palace of Westminster. It was anciently the site of several grand townhouses. Stow states that among its inhabitants in his time were "divers noblemen and gentlemen", including Sir Edward Hobbes, John Thynne, Esq., Henry Clinton, 2nd Earl of Lincoln, (Lincoln House) and the Earl of Derby (Derby House) and the Duchess of Somerset, mother of the Earl of Hertford (Hertford House), who both occupied "stately" houses. Also situated on Canon Row was Sussex House, home of Thomas Radclyffe, 3rd Earl of Sussex.

The current buildings on the site, including the Canon Row Police Station, date from the early 20th century.

== Sources ==
- Thornbury, Walter, Old and New London, Volume 3, London, 1878, pp. 376–382: Whitehall: Precinct and Gardens
- Ros, Maggi, Life in Elizabethan England: A London and Westminster Directory, 2008
