= Lady Margaret Seymour =

- Born: c. 1540
- Died: unknown
- Father: Edward Seymour, 1st Duke of Somerset
- Mother: Anne Stanhope

Lady Margaret Seymour (c. 1540 – ?) was a writer during the sixteenth century in England, along with her sisters, Anne Seymour, Countess of Warwick and Lady Jane Seymour, including of the Hecatodistichon.

Seymour, along with some of her other upper-class female relatives, including Lady Jane, was tutored at home by Humanist Roger Ascham.

== Family ==
She was the daughter of Edward Seymour, 1st Duke of Somerset, who from 1547 was the Lord Protector of England after the death of Henry VIII and during the minority of Margaret's first cousin, Edward VI. She was thus the niece of Henry VIII's third wife, Queen Jane.

Her cousin King Edward VI's henchmen, led by Sir John Gates, stole valuable jewelry and silver from her.
