= Christopher Rich (theatre manager) =

English lawyer and theatrical manager (1657–1714)

Christopher Rich (1657–1714) was a lawyer and theatrical manager in London in the late 17th and early 18th century.

== Life ==
Originally an attorney, on 24 March 1688 Rich purchased from Alexander D'Avenant, co-patentee with Charles Killigrew, a share in the management of the Theatre Royal. D'Avenant retired, while Killigrew allowed Rich to become the active partner. The management of the Drury Lane theatre was combined with that of the subordinate house in Dorset Garden. From the first, Rich was involved in continual lawsuits and difficulties with the actors, the proprietors, and the lord chamberlain, but his legal training assisted him.

Christopher Rich managed the monopoly United Company from 1693, with such autocratic methods that the senior actors including Thomas Betterton, Elizabeth Barry, and Anne Bracegirdle rebelled.

His difficulties were at their height in 1695, when Betterton obtained a patent for a new theatre in Lincoln's Inn Fields, and successfully opened it on 30 April with William Congreve's Love for Love. Rich would not listen to any suggestion of accommodation between the rival companies. He busied himself, according to Colley Cibber, in tinkering with alterations at Drury Lane, and prophesied failure for the other house. In 1705 Betterton transferred his company to the new theatre in the Haymarket, which had been planned by John Vanbrugh for opera during the previous year, but of which the projector had wearied. In October 1706 Vanbrugh leased the Haymarket Theatre to Rich's agent, Owen Swiney; who took with him a small detachment of actors from Drury Lane. The three London playhouses (Drury Lane, Dorset Garden, and Haymarket) were thus alike for a short while under Rich.

Rich, however, was abrasive, and one of the chief proprietors, Sir Thomas Skipwith, parted with his share to Henry Brett. Intrigue by Brett seems to have influenced Henry Grey, 1st Duke of Kent, the Lord Chamberlain, to issue, on 31 December 1707, an edict restricting the Haymarket to opera under Swiney's directorship, and ordering Rich's actors back to Drury Lane. About the same time Swiney became completely estranged from Rich. The Haymarket and Drury Lane companies appeared together in Hamlet at Drury Lane on 15 January 1708. But the reunion satisfied no one. On 31 March 1708 Brett assigned his share in the patent to Robert Wilks, Richard Estcourt, and Cibber, and these actors planned for a secession.

Rich now meddled with benefit performances: the agreements of the actors were only verbal, and were disregarded by the patentees, who refused any actor a benefit until he or she had signed a paper signifying voluntary acceptance of the condition of paying one-third to the patentees. The actors applied to the Lord Chamberlain for redress, and the patentees were directed to satisfy their claims. The patentees demurred, and the theatre was reduced to silence (6 June 1709), no performances being allowed. Rich then published an advertisement, claiming Wilks, Betterton, Estcourt, Cibber, John Mills, and Mrs. Oldfield had received nearly £2000. Rich, with other patentees, in a petition to the queen, stated their grievances against the lord chamberlain, who refused them any redress. A second petition was sent by a few of the silenced actors, members of Drury Lane. Wilks, Thomas Dogget, Cibber, and Mrs. Oldfield did not join in the petition; they had formed an agreement to join Swiney at the Haymarket, where they opened with Othello on 15 September 1709.

Rich kept together Barton Booth and other actors; the order, however, remained in force, and William Collier, one of the proprietors of the patents, applied for and obtained a license, and ultimately succeeded in obtaining a lease of Drury Lane. Now that no performances were given, Rich was paying no rent, but he sought to retain the theatre in his hands. He stripped it of everything worth moving, except scenery. In The Tatler, on 15 July, No. 42, Richard Steele gave a mock catalogue of the contents of "the palace in Drury Lane, of Christopher Rich, Esquire, who is breaking up housekeeping." There are such things as a rainbow, a little faded; Roxana's nightgown, Othello's handkerchief, the imperial robes of Xerxes, never worn but once, a basket-hilted sword, very convenient to carry milk in, and the like. Collier obtained, on 22 November 1709, possession of the house. A humorous account of these proceedings is given in The Tatler, No. 99, 26 November 1709, in which Rich, depicted under the name of Divito, is said to "have wounded all adversaries with so much skill that men feared even to be in the right against him". Collier claimed to have the consent of a majority of the other renters for what he had done, and was joined by actors who had once worked for Rich. Finally Rich lost his hold on Drury Lane.

Rich had already acquired a lease, with the patent granted by Charles II, of the deserted theatre erected by Sir William D'Avenant in Little Lincoln's Inn Fields. On the strength of this he erected a new theatre on about the same site in Portugal Row, his architect being James Shepherd, who had also built the playhouse in Goodman's Fields. Before it was finished Rich died, 4 November 1714, leaving the building to be opened by his sons, John Rich and Christopher Mosyer Rich.
