= William Skipwith II =

English politician

Sir William Henry Skipwith II
- Born: ca. 1564
- Died: 3 May 1610
- Education: Jesus College, Cambridge
- Spouses: Margaret Cave, Jane Roberts
- Children: 8, including Henry Skipwith
- Parents: Henry Skipwith (died 1588) (father); Jane Hall (mother)

Sir William Henry Skipwith II (ca. 1564 – 3 May 1610), of Cotes, Leicestershire, was an English politician.

== Career ==
He was the eldest son of Henry Skipwith (died 1588) and was educated at Jesus College, Cambridge. He was appointed Sheriff of Leicestershire for 1598. He was a Member (MP) of the Parliament of England for Leicestershire in 1601 and Leicester in 1604.

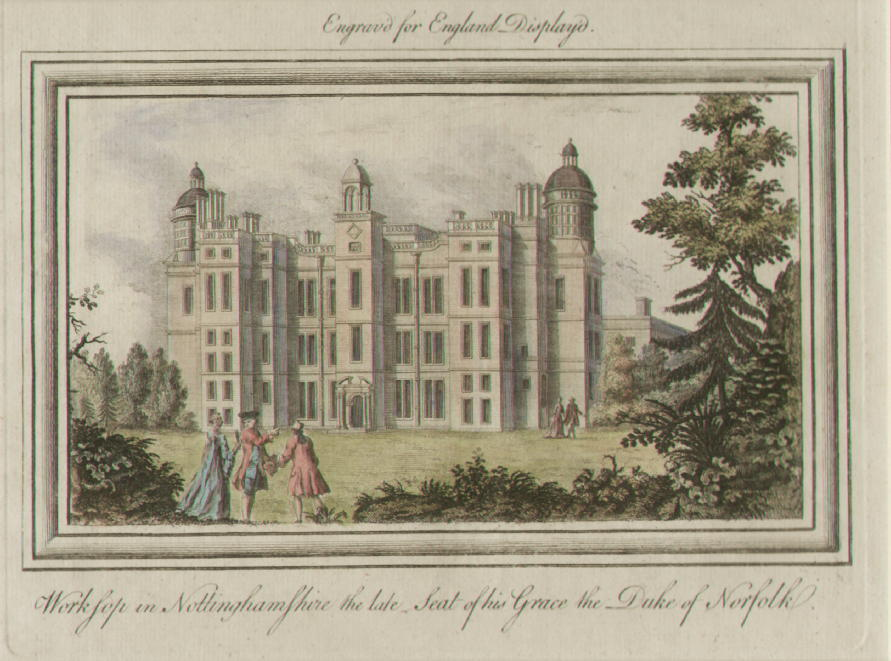
William Skipwith met the Scottish royals on route to London at Worksop Manor

Skipwith was knighted on 21 April 1603 at Worksop Manor by King James I, who was travelling to London following the Union of the Crowns. He returned to Worksop on 18 June to meet Anne of Denmark at Worksop, and she and her son Prince Henry went on to stay in his house at Leicester on 23 June, despite fears of plague. Princess Elizabeth stayed at the house of Mr Pilkington, sleeping in sheets borrowed from a house at Elmesthorpe. Anne of Denmark and Prince Henry were given silver cups by the town council. The cups were bought in London from William Herrick (a goldsmith with a Leicester background), and then engraved with the royal arms. Prince Henry's cup was smaller. Princess Elizabeth arrived separately in Leicester and was given claret, white wine, and Rhenish wine, with a sugar loaf weighing 9 pounds 10 ounces. She was nearly 7 years old.

On 15 and 16 August 1604, Prince Charles and Alexander Seton lodged in Skipwith's Leicester townhouse on their way to London. Next they went to Dingley, the home of Thomas Griffin.

He died on 3 May 1610 in London and was buried in Leicestershire.

== Marriage and family ==
He married twice: firstly Lady Margaret Cave, the daughter of Roger Cave of Stanford, Northamptonshire. They had four sons and four daughters. His second wife was Jane, the daughter of John Roberts and the widow of John Markham of Sidebrook. His eldest son, Henry Skipwith, was knighted at Whitehall Palace in June 1609 and made a baronet in December 1622.

Parliament of England
Preceded by Sir Edward Hastings; Sir Francis Hastings	Member of Parliament for Leicestershire; 1601; With: Henry Hastings	Succeeded by Sir George Villiers; Thomas Beaumont
Preceded by George Beaumont; William Herrick	Member of Parliament for Leicester; 1604–1610; With: Henry Beaumont	Succeeded by Henry Rich; Sir Francis Leigh
