= Sir Thomas Skipwith, 2nd Baronet =

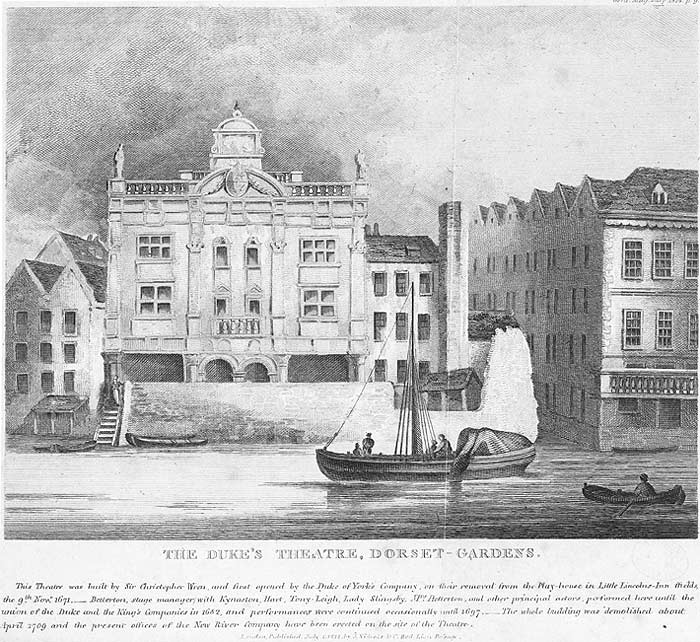
Duke's Theatre at Dorset Garden. This was Skipwith's first recorded involvement in the London theatre world when he became a shareholder in 1682.

Sir Thomas Skipwith, 2nd Baronet (ca. 1652 – 15 June 1710) was a Member of Parliament, and theatrical manager in London in the late 17th and early 18th century.

== Family ==
Skipwith was the son of Sir Thomas Skipwith, 1st Baronet and his wife Elizabeth Lathom daughter of Ralph Lathom of Upminster, Essex.

He married Margaret, daughter of George Brydges, 6th Baron Chandos, after being admitted to Gray's Inn on 5 August 1670. Margaret was the most senior descendant of Anne Stanley, Countess of Castlehaven, who was a descendant in turn of Mary Tudor, Queen of France. If the will of Henry VIII, and invalidity of Lady Katherine Grey’s marriage was to be believed, upon Margaret’s death, Sir Thomas’ son and heir, George, would theoretically be the King of England.

== Career ==
After a brief military career, Skipwith was elected a Member of Parliament for Malmsbury in 1696.

On 31 March 1682, Dame Mary Davenant, widow of Sir William Davenant, sold Skipwith a half share in the Duke's Company. He later formed a partnership with his late father's clerk, Christopher Rich, to manage the Theatre Royal, Drury Lane. During this time the theatre ceased performing serious dramatic works in favour of lighter entertainments, leading the noted actor Thomas Betterton to petition the Lord Chamberlain in protest.

== Personal life ==
Skipwith was parodied by Delarivier Manley as 'Sir Peter Vainlove' in the Adventures of Rivella published in 1714. She described him as having:

"...a very good Face, but his Body was grown fat: He was naturally short, and his Legs being what they call somewhat bandy, he was advis’d to wear his Cloaths very long, to help conceal that Defect... he was detestably vain, and lov’d to be thought in the Favour of the Fair, which was indeed his only Fault, for he had a great deal of Wit and good Nature; but sure no Youth of Twenty had so vast a Foible for being admired. He wrote very pretty well-turned Billet-deuxs..."

Manley also described his pursuit of two mistresses, and Skipworth's philandering led to him living apart from his wife on at least one occasion. In 1707, Isabella Wentworth, a Lady of the Bedchamber to Queen Anne, wrote privately of his return:

"Sir Thomas Skippoth has turned out his hoar, and is grown a very good husband, his lady lives with him hear...I sopose he wants money and soe weedles her."

Skipwith left substantial sums to his housekeeper, Susanna Gurney, and her daughter, Charlotte. Historian D. W. Hayton, who describes Skipwith as 'an engaging roué', suggests this 'strengthens the suspicion' that Gurney was also his mistress, and her daughter his illegitimate child.

Parliament of England
Preceded by Goodwin Wharton; Sir James Long, Bt; George Booth	Member for Malmesbury; 1696–1698; With: Craven Howard 1695–1698	Succeeded by Michael Wicks; Edward Pauncefort
Baronetage of England
Preceded by Thomas Skipwith	Baronet (of Metheringham); 1694–1710	Succeeded by George Brydges Skipwith
