= Henry Skipwith (died 1588) =

Member of the Parliament of England

- Died: 14 August 1588
- Spouse: Jane Hall
- Children: 13, including William Skipwith (died 1610)
- Parents: William Skipwith (died 1547) (father); Alice Dymoke (mother)

Henry Skipwith (died 14 August 1588) was a Member of the Parliament of England for Leicester in 1584 and 1586.

Skipwith was a child of William Skipwith (died 1547) and Alice Dymoke. He married Jane Hall, and had thirteen children, including William Skipwith II.

== See also ==
- Skipwith baronets
