= Frances Stewart, Duchess of Lennox =

English noblewoman (1578–1639)

Frances Stewart
- Duchess of Richmond; Duchess of Lennox; Countess of Hertford
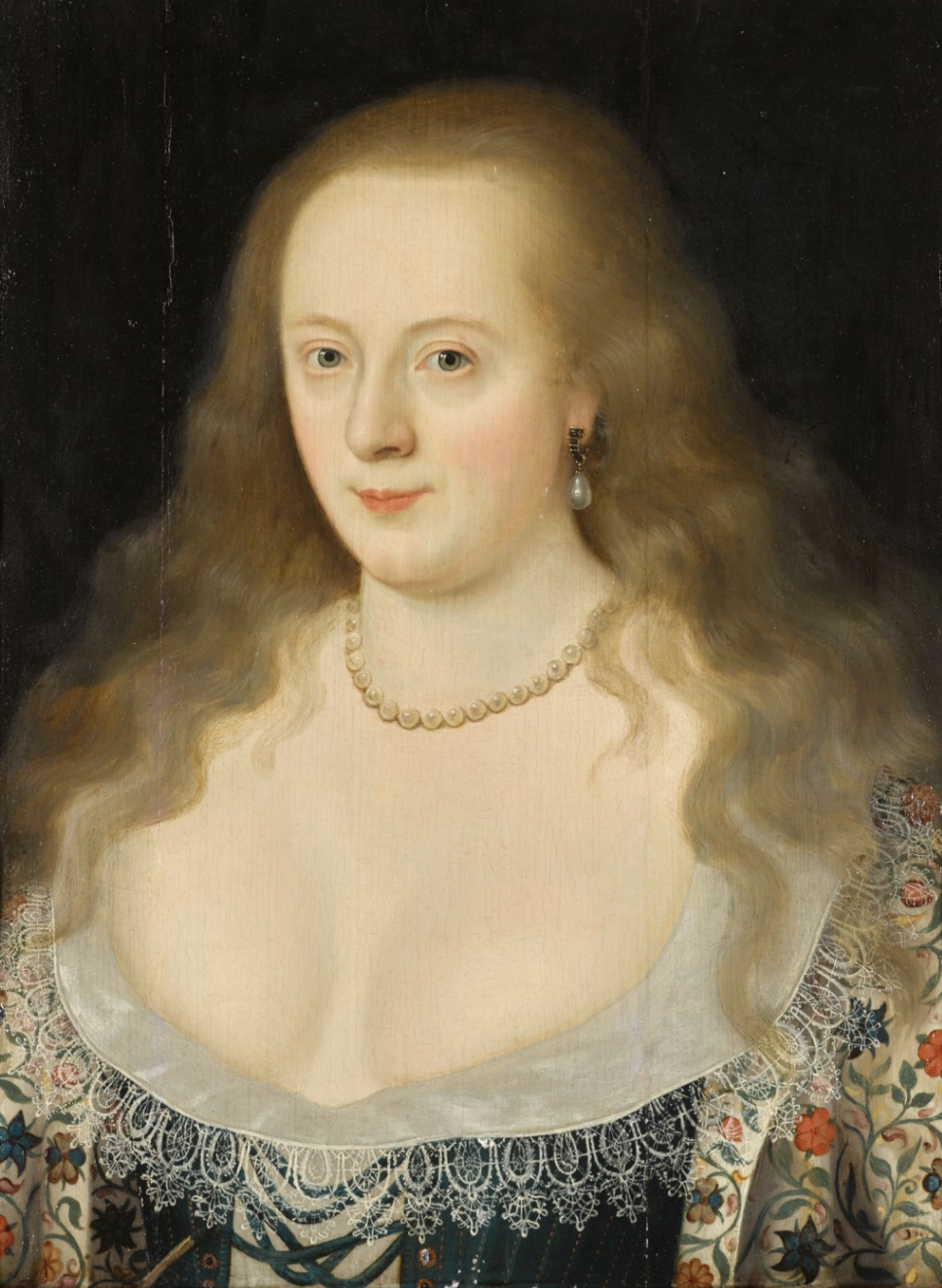
- Portrait by Marcus Gheeraerts the Younger, c. 1615
- Full name: Frances Howard
- Born: 27 July 1578
- Died: 8 October 1639 (aged 61)
- Noble family: Howard
- Spouses: Henry Pranell (m. 1592; died 1599); Edward Seymour, 1st Earl of Hertford (m. 1601; died 1621); Ludovic Stewart, 2nd Duke of Lennox (m. 1621; died 1624)
- Father: Thomas Howard, 1st Viscount Howard of Bindon
- Mother: Mabel Burton

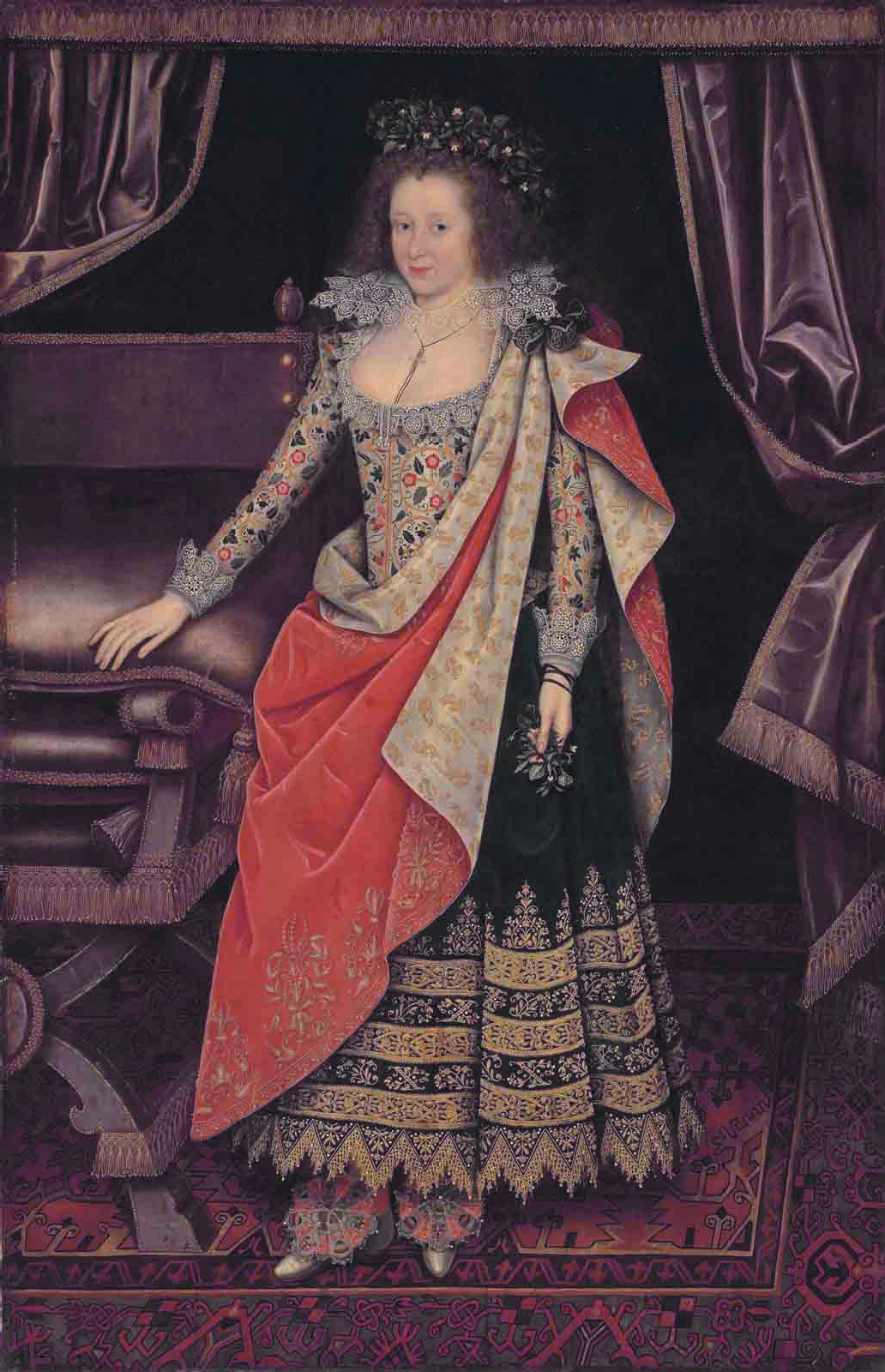
Frances Howard as Countess of Hertford, by Marcus Gheeraerts the Younger, 1611

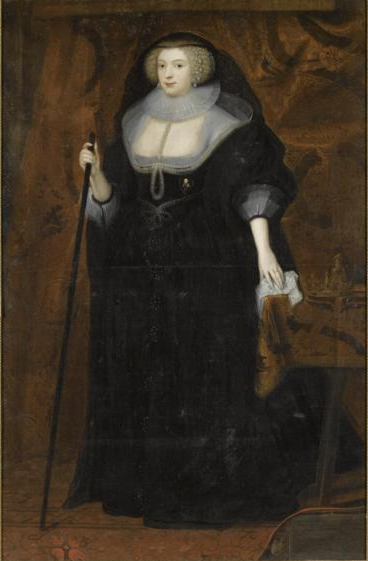
Frances Stewart, Duchess of Richmond and Lennox, as a widow, after a lost portrait by Anthony van Dyck of 1633

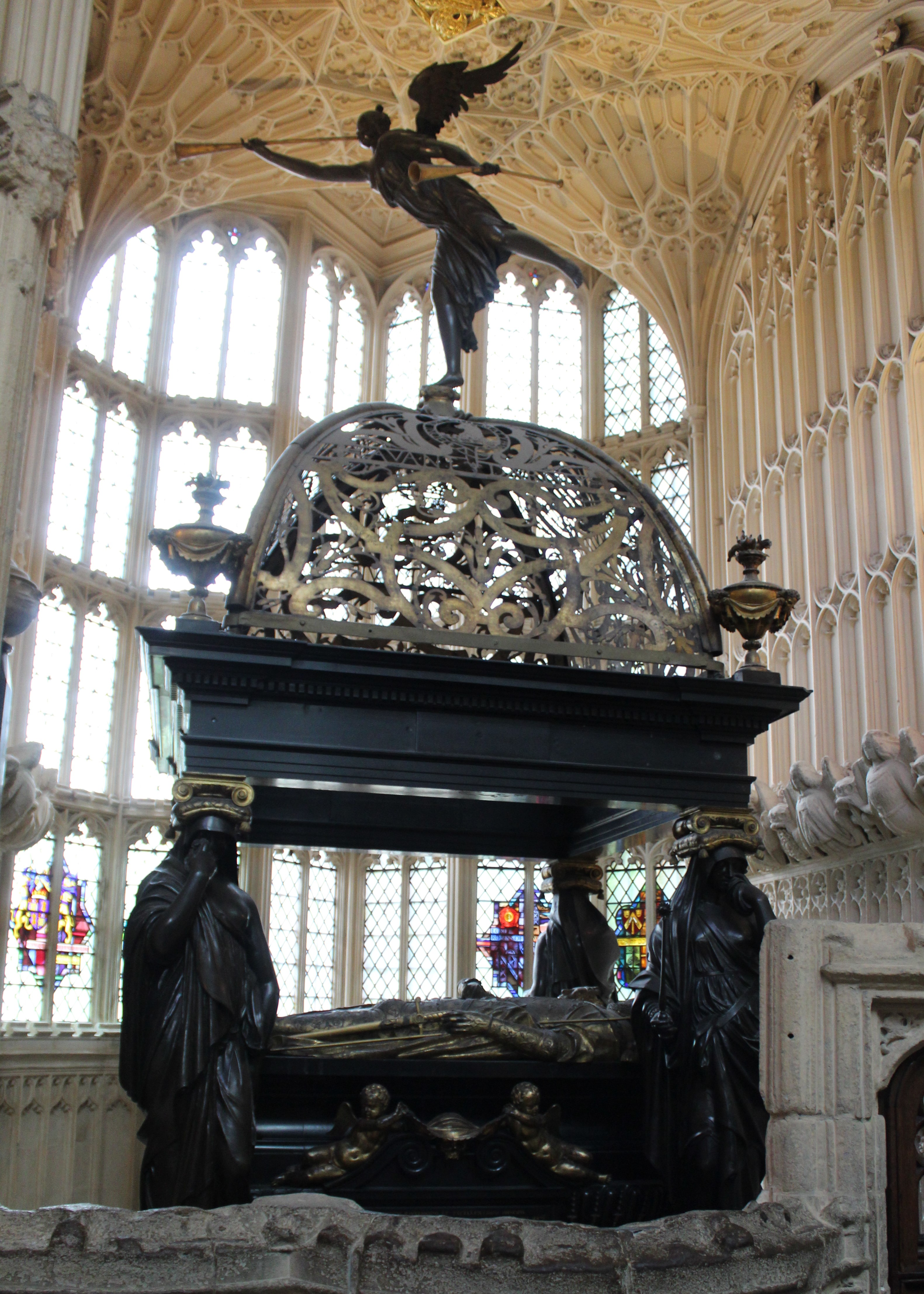
The Stewart family vault, Westminster Abbey

Frances Stewart (née Howard), Duchess of Lennox and Richmond, Countess of Hertford (27 July 1578 – 8 October 1639), was the daughter of a younger son of the Duke of Norfolk. An orphan of small fortune, she rose to be the only duchess at the court of James I of England. She married the son of a London alderman who died in 1599, leaving her a wealthy widow at a young age. She became, for 20 years, the third wife of the ageing Edward Seymour, 1st Earl of Hertford, nephew of Jane Seymour, third queen consort of Henry VIII. Within months of Edward's death she married a cousin of James I, Ludovic Stewart, 2nd Duke of Lennox and 1st Duke of Richmond. One of the great beauties of the Jacobean court, she was also the patron of Captain John Smith of the Virginia Colony.

== Life ==
Frances Howard was the daughter of Thomas Howard, 1st Viscount Howard of Bindon (c. 1520–1582), and his wife Mabel Burton, daughter of Nicholas Burton. Lord Howard was the third and youngest son of Thomas Howard, 3rd Duke of Norfolk, by his second wife Elizabeth Stafford, daughter of Edward Stafford, 3rd Duke of Buckingham.

Orphaned at a young age, Frances Howard "was married off" to Henry Pranell, the son of a rich wine merchant and alderman and a patron of the Virginia Company, in early 1592. The marriage displeased Lord Burghley, who had other plans for the descendant of two Dukes than marriage with a vintner. Pranell was moved to write a letter of apology to Burghley:

Right honorable and my verie good Lorde, being to my greate griffe [grief] certified, how your Honor by misinformacon shoulde be incensed ageinste me, and daring not presume into your Lordshipps presence, either to excuse my self, or to craue pardon for my amisse, I thought it my dutie in these fewe lines with submission to acknowledge my faulte, and vnder your Honors fauoure with all humilitie to alledge somewhat for my selfe. True it is, my Lorde, that I haue maried Mrs Fraunces Howarde, daughter to the Lorde Thomas Howarde, Viscount Howarde of Bindon deceased, but I protest (as I desire your Honors patronage) I did not begine my sute without the liking of her freindes, I proceeded not without their furtherance, neither can they justifie I maried her ageinst their wills. The gentlewoman I haue a longe time loued dearlie, being bounde therevnto by her mutuall liking of me: litle or nothing I expected with her, considering she had litle or nothing to mainetaine and preferr her self; she being destitute of freindes and abilitie I thought it a most frindlie parte (with her good acceptance) to present her my selfe, and therbie to make her partaker of all wherwith God hath blessed me: wherbie (as latelie I vnderstoode) I haue (though not willfullie offended), yet ignorantly incurred your Lordships just displeasure, as not knowing that your Honor minded otherwise to haue preferred her ...

Pranell died in 1599, leaving his wife a wealthy widow at the age of 20 or 21. "A woman of enormous social ambition", she abandoned a suitor, Sir George Rodney, and secretly married the widowed Edward Seymour, 1st Earl of Hertford (1537–1621) on 27 May 1601. Hertford was some forty years older than his third wife, and was the son of Edward Seymour, 1st Duke of Somerset, Lord Protector in the reign of Edward VI, and the nephew of King Edward's mother, queen Jane Seymour. The marriage was performed clandestinely by Thomas Montfort without banns or license, for which Monfort was suspended for three years by Archbishop John Whitgift.

When the secret marriage became public, the distraught Rodney shut himself up in a chamber at an inn, wrote a "large paper of well-composed verses" to the Countess in his own blood, and "ran himself upon his sword."

=== Anne of Denmark ===
After the Union of the Crowns, she became a lady of the bedchamber to Anne of Denmark, the wife of King James. The queen wore a miniature portrait of Lady Hertford, and visited them at Elvetham in September 1603.

In November 1603, Frances, Countess of Hertford, wrote to Earl's steward James Kirkton about purchases to be made as Christmas and New Year's Day gifts. She wanted to give an embroidered night cap to Sir George Hinds. It had to be worked in black silk, gold, and silver thread, "very fair, and not grossly wrought". Mrs Price in the Strand had the best selection. Her sister Mary would be able to help him choose one that she could pass off as her own work, or made in her household. Her husband was at Winchester with the court, and Frances also wanted gifts for Anne of Denmark's ladies. Lady Hertford appeared as Vesta in the queen's masque The Vision of the Twelve Goddesses in January 1604. The libretto was by Samuel Daniel and the music by Alfonso Ferrabosco the younger.

=== Duchess ===
Hertford died in 1621, leaving her wealthy. Some two months later, on 16 June 1621, Frances married Ludovic Stewart, 2nd Duke of Lennox. Stewart was the cousin of King James, a Privy Councillor, and Steward of the Royal Household.

According to John Chamberlain, the Duchess of Lennox looked after the Marchioness of Buckingham when she was ill and pregnant, making her broths and caudles. King James was grateful and gave her a chain set with diamonds with his miniature portrait in April 1622. John Chamberlain also writes that King James was inclined to pay off some her debts.

Joseph Mead related a story of life at court in May 1622. King James asked for a gold chain to give to an ambassador as a parting gift. A chain that had belonged to Anne of Denmark was brought for his approval, but he thought it was too valuable. Prince Charles suggested that he should present this chain to the new Duchess of Lennox. The King agreed, and Charles presented the chain to her and placed it around her neck. According to Joseph Mead, this made Mary Villiers, Countess of Buckingham, jealous and she decided to acquire the chain by sending a messenger to the Duchess, pretending the King had asked for its return. Frances was surprised, and questioned the messenger and the fraud was exposed. The Countess of Buckingham was asked to leave court for a while. Mead wrote that this court gossip came from Sir William Bourser of Uppingham. However, the story Mead heard was likely a rumour to discredit the Countess of Buckingham, based on gifts of jewellery at court which are well documented. Records show that the Duchess of Lennox was given a jewel set with diamonds in the form of the letter "H" around this time (which had belonged to Anne of Denmark), and she had already been given a New Year's Day gift of a gold collar set with rubies, diamonds, and pearls. The Countess of Buckingham also received a gold collar at New Year.

Ludovic Stewart was created Earl of Newcastle upon Tyne and Duke of Richmond in the peerage of England on 17 August 1623, and Frances Stewart became known as the "Double Duchess". The duke died suddenly in bed in his lodging at Whitehall, on the morning of 16 February 1623/24. Stewart left no children, and the dukedom of Richmond and earldom of Newcastle upon Tyne became extinct upon his death. The dukedom of Lennox was inherited by his younger brother Esmé Stuart, 3rd Duke of Lennox (1579–1624). His wife retained the title Duchess of Richmond until her own death on 8 October 1639. She was buried in Westminster Abbey next to her third husband, in the "magnificent" tomb she had had erected in his memory.

== Patronage ==
The widowed Duchess of Richmond provided financial support for the publication of Captain John Smith's Generall Historie of Virginia, New-England, and the Summer Isles, which was issued in 1624 with a dedication "to the Illustrious and Most Noble Princesse, the Lady Frances, Duchesse of Richmond and Lenox."

== Portraits ==
"[A] typical Howard woman, fair-haired and beautiful", Frances Stewart was painted by leading artists of the age, including Marcus Gheeraerts the Younger, William Larkin (a protégé of her second husband, the Earl of Hertford), and Anthony van Dyck. Several portraits of her survive, as originals or copies.
