= Skipwith Hall, North Yorkshire =

Building in Skipwith, North Yorkshire, England

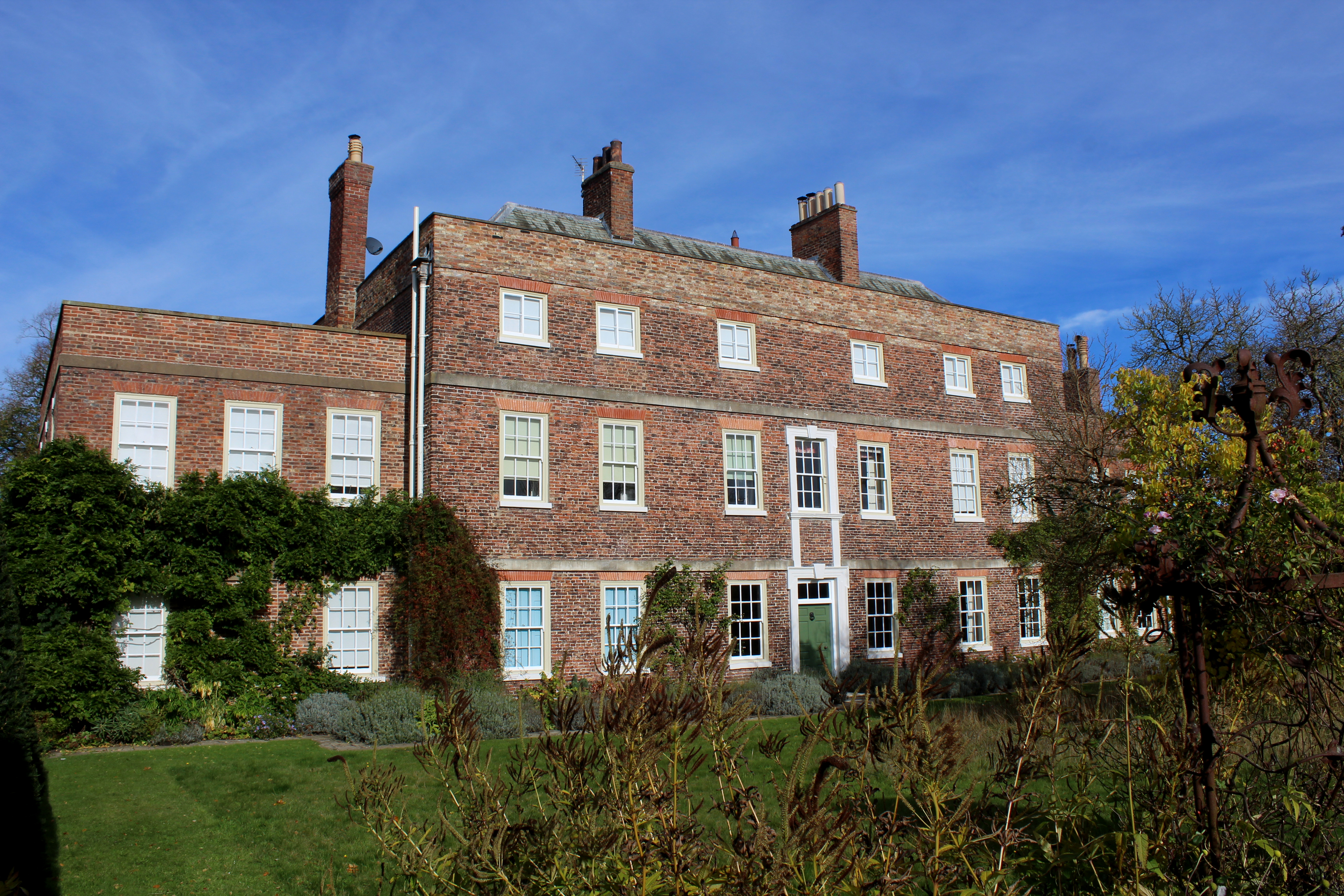
The building, in 2025

Skipwith Hall is a historic building in Skipwith, a village in North Yorkshire, in England.

A country house was constructed in Skipwith in the 17th century, and rebuilt in about 1725 for the Toulson family. The service wing at the rear of the building is the only section to retain 17th-century material. A wing was added to the left of the house in 1904, and another to the right in 1930, that one to a design by Owen Little. The building was grade II* listed in 1951. The grounds of the hall are regularly opened as part of the National Gardens Scheme or for the town fete. A hayloft in the grounds was converted into a theatre in 1930, and was refurbished in 2008.

Rear wall and gateway

The house is in pinkish-brown brick, with dressings in red brick and stone, floor bands, a parapet, and a Welsh slate roof. There are three storeys and seven bays, and flanking two-storey three-bay wings. The central doorway has an eared architrave, a fanlight and a keystone, and the window above also has an eared architrave and a keystone. The windows are sashes, those in the top floor of the main block are horizontally sliding, and all have flat red brick arches. Inside, there are many original features, including the main staircase, plasterwork and panelling, while the staircase in the service wing is late 17th century.

== See also ==
- Grade II* listed buildings in North Yorkshire (district)
- Listed buildings in Skipwith
