= Skipwith =

Village and civil parish in North Yorkshire, England

Coordinates: 53.8387°N 0.9966°W

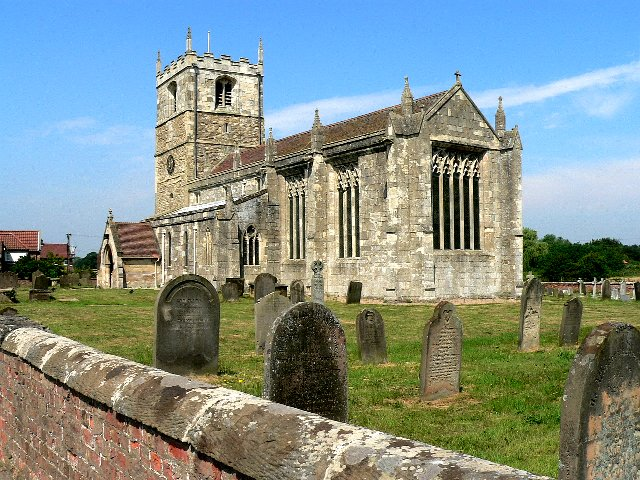
- St Helen's parish church

- Location within North Yorkshire
- Population: 266 (2011 Census)
- OS grid reference: SE6638
- Civil parish: Skipwith
- Unitary authority: North Yorkshire
- Ceremonial county: North Yorkshire
- Region: Yorkshire and the Humber
- Country: England
- Sovereign state: United Kingdom
- Post town: Selby
- Postcode district: YO8
- Dialling code: 01757
- Police: North Yorkshire
- Fire: North Yorkshire
- Ambulance: Yorkshire
- UK Parliament: Selby
- Website: Skipwith

Skipwith is a village and civil parish about 4 miles (6.4 km) north-east of Selby and 10 miles (16 km) south-east of York in North Yorkshire, England. It was historically in the East Riding of Yorkshire. After the 1974 local government reorganisation Skipwith was in the Selby District of the shire county of North Yorkshire. In 2023 the district was abolished and North Yorkshire became a unitary authority.

The name Skipwith derives from the Old English scēpwīc meaning 'sheep trading settlement'. Wīc was later changed to the Old Norse viðr meaning 'wood'.

== Manor ==
The Domesday Book records that by 1086 Robert de Stutville held a carucate of land at Skipwith. His family held a manor here until 1229, when it passed to Hugh Wake by his marriage to Joan de Stutville. In 1325 it passed to Edmund of Woodstock, 1st Earl of Kent by his marriage to Margaret Wake, 3rd Baroness Wake of Liddell. It remained with his heirs until 1418, a decade after their line became extinct with the death of Edmund Holland, 4th Earl of Kent in 1408.

== Churches ==
=== Church of England ===
The oldest parts of St Helen's Church, Skipwith are Saxon. The west tower began as a porch, but in the 11th century upper stages were added to turn it into a tower. The tower is linked with the nave by a characteristic Saxon plain Romanesque round arch, so the nave must also have originally been Saxon. St Helen's parish is now part of a joint benefice with the parish of Bubwith with Ellerton and Aughton.

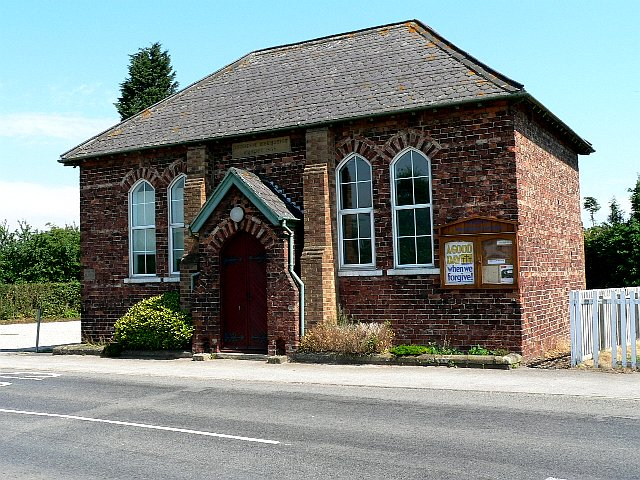
Wesleyan chapel of 1876, now the Methodist church

=== Methodist ===
Two families in Skipwith were Methodists by 1764. The village's Methodists worshipped in each other's homes until 1833, when a Wesleyan Methodist chapel was built. In the 1860s the Vicar of St Helen's claimed that 300 or 400 of the villagers were Methodists. In 1876 the first chapel was replaced with a larger brick one next to the parish school.

The chapel is now Skipwith Methodist Church. It is a member of the Goole and Selby Methodist Circuit.

== Historic secular buildings ==
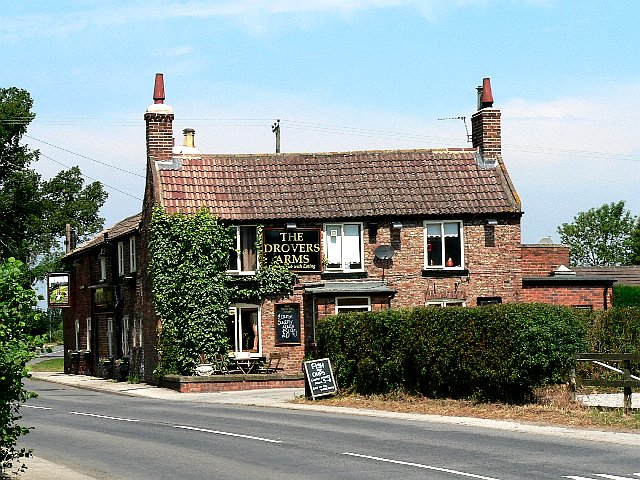
The Drovers Arms gastropub

Skipwith Hall is an early 18th century house of seven bays and two and a half storeys, flanked by a three-bay wing on each side. It is now a Grade II* listed building.

A school and schoolmaster's house built in 1714, founded and endowed by the bequest of a Dorothy Wilson. In the 1851 its pupils included 11 boarders, and in the 1860s a separate classroom for girls was added. In 1871 the school had 54 pupils but in 1872 this fell to only 30. From the 1900s to the 1930s the school averaged 30–40 pupils, but in 1938 this had declined to 26. In 1957 the school was closed and its pupils were transferred to Thorganby. Since 1959 the school has served as the village hall.

0.5 miles (800 m) south-west of the village is the site of RAF Riccall, a training airfield that was a heavy bomber conversion unit in the Second World War. The site is now a national nature reserve known as Skipwith Common.

== Amenities ==
Skipwith has a public house, the Drovers Arms, which is now a gastropub.

== See also ==
- Listed buildings in Skipwith
- Skipwith railway station
- Skipwith Common

== Sources and further reading ==
- Baggs, A. P.; Kent, G. H. R.; Purdy, J. D. (1976). Allison, K. J. (ed.). A History of the County of York East Riding. Victoria County History. Vol. 3 Ouse and Derwent wapentake, and part of Harthill wapentake. pp. 89–101.
- Pevsner, Nikolaus (1972). Yorkshire: York & the East Riding. The Buildings of England. Harmondsworth: Penguin Books. pp. 340–342. ISBN 0-14-071043-4.
