= Eliza Knight =

- Born: Eliza Knight
- Occupations: Journalist, author and podcaster
- Children: 3
- Website: elizaknight.com

Eliza Knight is a USA Today journalist and international bestselling American author known for her historical fiction and romance fiction novel series taking place in 15th century to 19th century Europe. She has also published numerous titles under the name E. Knight. Her love of history began as a young girl when she traipsed the halls of Versailles and ran through the fields in Southern France. She is the creator of the popular historical blog, History Undressed and a co-host on the History, Books and Wine podcast.

== Personal life ==
Knight is married with three children.

== Fiction novel series ==
=== Historical fiction standalones ===
- The Mayfair Bookshop (2022)
- Starring Adele Astaire (2023)
- The Queen's Faithful Companion (2024)
- Can't We Be Friends (2024)
- Confessions of a Grammar Queen (2025)

=== Order of Tales From The Tudor Court (Historical Fiction) ===
- My Lady Viper (2013)
- Prisoner of the Queen (2014)

=== Historical fiction anthologies ===
- A Day of Fire
- A Year of Ravens

=== Stolen Bride series ===
- The Highlander's Gift (2018)
- The Highlander's Reward (2012)
- The Highlander's Conquest (2012)
- The Highlander's Lady (2012)
- The Highlander's Warrior Bride (2013)
- The Highlander's Triumph (2013)
- The Highlander's Sin (2013)
- Wild Highland Mistletoe (2014)
- The Highlander's Temptation (2014)
- The Highlander's Charm (2015)
- The Highlander's Surrender (2019)
- The Highlander's Dare

=== Conquered Bride series ===
- Conquered by the Highlander
- Seduced by the Laird
- Claimed by the Warrior
- Stolen by the Laird
- Guarded by the Warrior

=== Sutherland Legacy series ===
- The Highlander's Gift (2018)
- The Highlander's Stolen Bride (2018)
- The Highlander's Quest (2018)
- The Highlander's Hellion (2018)
- The Highlander's Secret Vow (2019)
- The Highlander's Enchantment (2019)

=== Prince Charlie's Angels series ===
- The Rebel Wears Plaid (2020)
- Truly Madly Plaid (2020)
- You've Got Plaid (2021)

=== Order of Scots Of Honor series ===
- Return of the Scot (2021)
- The Scot is Hers (2021)
- Taming the Scot (2021)
- The Scot Who Loved Her (2022)

=== Highland Lairds series ===
- The Laird's Prize (2023)

=== Distinguished Scots series ===
- A Scot's Pride (2023)

=== Short stories/novellas ===
- A Gentleman's Kiss (2009)
- Apocalypse of the Heart (2011)
- Lady Seductress's Ball (2011)
- A Kilted Christmas Wish (2013)
- The Highlander Who Stole Christmas (2020)
- Highland Tryst (2021)
- Highland Heat (2021)
- Lady in Red (2021)

=== Men Of The Sea series ===
- Her Captain Returns (2009)
- Her Captain Surrenders (2009)
- Her Captain Dares All (2010)

=== Order of Rules Of Chivalry series ===
- A Lady's Charade (2011)
- A Knight's Victory (2012)

=== Order of Highland Wars series ===
- Highland Hunger (2014)
- Highland Sacrifice (2015)
- Highland Victory (2015)

=== One Night series ===
- The Rebound Pact (2013)
- Wherever You Are (2017)

=== MacDougall Legacy series ===
- Laird of Shadows (2017)
- Laird of Twilight (2017)
- Laird of Darkness (2017)

=== Thistle and Rose series ===
- Eternally Bound (2015)
- Breath From the Sea (2016)
- Promise of a Knight (2019)

=== Wicked Women series ===
- Her Desperate Gamble (2017)
- Seducing the Sheriff (2017)
- Kiss Me, Cowboy

=== Highland Bound series ===
- Behind the Plaid (2013)
- Bared To The Laird (2013)
- Dark Side of the Laird (2013)
- Highlander's Touch (2015)
- Highlander Undone (2016)
- Highlander Unraveled (2016)
- Draped in Plaid (2016)
