= Anne Seymour, Countess of Warwick =

English noblewoman (1538–1588)

Lady Anne Seymour
- Countess of Warwick
- Born: 1538
- Died: February 1588 (aged 49–50)
- Spouses: John Dudley, 2nd Earl of Warwick; Sir Edward Unton
- Issue: Henry Unton
- Father: Edward Seymour, 1st Duke of Somerset
- Mother: Anne Stanhope

Anne Dudley (née Seymour) Countess of Warwick (1538–1588) was a writer during the sixteenth century in England, along with her sisters Lady Margaret Seymour and Lady Jane Seymour. She was the eldest daughter of Edward Seymour, 1st Duke of Somerset, who from 1547–1549 was the Lord Protector of England during the minority of her cousin, Edward VI. Being educated by the French humanist and poet, Nicholas Denisot, Anne Seymour with her sisters Margaret and Jane composed 103 Latin distichs for the tomb of Marguerite de Navarre, which were published in France as Hecatodistichon. The first edition of March 1550 was followed by a second in 1551, containing significant alterations.

== Marriages ==
On 3 June 1550 Anne Seymour was married to John Dudley, Viscount Lisle, son and heir of the Duke of Northumberland. King Edward VI was present at the festivities. The match was intended as an expression of renewed amity between the young people's fathers, who were political rivals, but the peace would not last.

After the Lady Jane Grey episode in 1553, Anne's husband, now Earl of Warwick, was imprisoned in the Tower of London, where she was allowed to visit him. He died of an illness in October 1554, days after his release.

Anne Seymour's second husband was Sir Edward Unton KB (1534–1582), a Member of Parliament. Their sons included Edward Unton MP and Sir Henry Unton (1558–1596), who became a diplomat. From 1566, the Countess suffered from recurring bouts of madness, and in 1582 was declared a lunatic. Some of the interests in her lands were assigned to Robert Dudley, 1st Earl of Leicester, her former brother-in-law. She was placed in the custody of her son, Henry Unton. Anne Seymour died in February 1588 and was buried at Faringdon in Berkshire (now Oxfordshire).
