= William Skipwith (died 1586) =

English politician

Sir William Skipwith (by 1510 – 17 October 1586) was an English politician.

He was born the eldest son of Sir William Skipwith and his first wife Elizabeth Tyrwhitt. He was admitted in 1527 to study law at Grays Inn.

Skipwith married Elizabeth Page, the daughter of Sir Richard Page of Beechwood, Hertfordshire, and Elizabeth Bourchier, by whom he had a son and five daughters.

He succeeded his father in 1547 and was knighted later the same year. He was elected a member of parliament (MP) to represent Lincolnshire in 1547.

He was appointed High sheriff of Lincolnshire for 1552–53 and 1563–64 and justice of the peace (JP) for Lindsey from 1554 to 1572.

He died on 17 October 1586 at Hanby, Lincolnshire, and was buried at South Ormsby.
