= William Skipwith (died 1547) =

English politician

- Died: 7 July 1547
- Spouse(s): Elizabeth Tyrwhitt (c. 1505 - before 1510; her death), Alice Dymoke (before c. 1510)
- Children: 14, including William Skipwith (MP died 1586), Henry Skipwith (died 1588)
- Parents: Sir John Skipwith (father); Catherine Fitzwilliam (mother)

Sir William Skipwith (1487 – 7 July 1547), was an English politician.

He was the eldest son of Sir John Skipwith (born 1441) of South Ormsby, and his wife Catherine (born 1450). He succeeded his father in 1518 and was knighted in 1533 or 1534. Through his mother Catherine, he was a first cousin of William FitzWilliam, 1st Earl of Southampton. William de Skipwith, Lord Chief Justice of Ireland in the fourteenth century, was his ancestor.

He was a justice of the peace (JP) for Lindsey from 1520 to his death and appointed High sheriff of Lincolnshire for 1526–1527. He was a member (MP) of the Parliament of England for Lincolnshire in 1529 and 1539.

He married twice:

- firstly Elizabeth, the daughter of Sir William Tyrwhitt of Kettleby, Lincolnshire with whom he had a son; and
- secondly Alice, the daughter and coheiress of Sir Lionel Dymoke of Mareham-on-thy-Hill, Lincolnshire, with whom he had a further four sons, including Henry Skipwith (died 1588), and seven daughters, including Margaret Skipwith, who is thought to have been a mistress of Henry VIII.

He also had two illegitimate children, a son and a daughter, by a certain Agnes.

He was succeeded by his son and heir Sir William.

== See also ==
- Skipwith baronets
