= Fulk Bourchier, 10th Baron FitzWarin =

English Baron (1445–1479)

Fulk Bourchier, 10 Baron FitzWarin
- Arms of Bourchier: Argent, a cross engrailed gules between four water bougets sable
- Born: 25 October 1445
- Died: 18 September 1479 (aged 33)
- Noble family: Bourchier
- Spouse: Elizabeth Dynham
- Issue: John Bourchier, 1st Earl of Bath; Elizabeth Bourchier; Joan Bourchier
- Father: William Bourchier, 9th Baron FitzWarin
- Mother: Thomasine Hankford

Fulk Bourchier, 10th Baron FitzWarin (25 October 1445 – 18 September 1479) was the son and heir of William Bourchier, 9th Baron FitzWarin (1407–1470) and the father of John Bourchier, 1st Earl of Bath. He was feudal baron of Bampton in Devon.

== Origins ==
Fulk Bourchier was the eldest son and heir of William Bourchier, 9th Baron FitzWarin (1407–1470) by his wife Thomasine Hankford, a daughter and coheiress of Sir Richard Hankford (c. 1397 – 1431) of Annery, Devon, feudal baron of Bampton.

== Marriage and issue ==
Arms of Dynham: Gules, four fusils in fess ermine

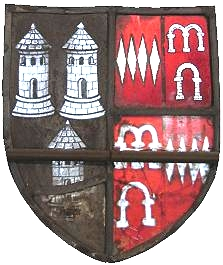
Arms of Sapcotes Sable, three dovecotes argent impaling Dinham Gules, four fusils in fess ermine (quartering Arches Gules, three arches argent), Bampton Church

Fulk Bourchier married Elizabeth Dynham (died 19 October 1516), the daughter of Sir John Dinham (1406–1458) of Nutwell by his wife Joan Arches (died 1497), and sister and coheir of John Dynham, 1st Baron Dynham (died 1501). After the death of Fulk Bourchier, Elizabeth Dynham remarried twice, firstly to Sir John Sapcotes (died 1501) of Elton, Huntingdonshire; a stained glass heraldic escutcheon survives in Bampton church showing the arms of Sapcotes impaling Dinham. After the death of Sapcotes, Elizabeth Dynham remarried secondly to Sir Thomas Brandon (died 27 January 1510) of Duddington, Northamptonshire. There was no issue of Elizabeth Dynham's marriage to Thomas Brandon, and according to Gunn, after his death she took a vow of celibacy before Bishop Fisher on 21 April 1510. She died 19 October 1516, and was buried in the Greyfriars, London.

By Elizabeth Dynham, Fulk Bourchier had the following children:

- John Bourchier, 1st Earl of Bath (20 July 1470 – 30 April 1539)
- Joan Bourchier (died 3 March 1532), second wife of James Tuchet, 7th Baron Audley, who was beheaded 28 June 1497 on Tower Hill for his part in the Cornish rebellion, and buried at the Blackfriars, London.
- Elizabeth Bourchier (before 1473 – 8 August 1557) who married, as his second wife, Sir Edward Stanhope (1462 – 6 June 1511), by whom she was the mother of Anne Stanhope (c. 1497 – 1587), the second wife of Edward Seymour, 1st Duke of Somerset (c. 1500 – 1552), brother of Queen Jane Seymour, uncle of King Edward VI and Lord Protector of England. The Duchess's monument and effigy survives in Westminster Abbey and displays profusely the Bourchier arms and Bourchier knots.

== Death and burial ==
Bourchier died 18 September 1479 at the age of thirty-three. In his will, dated 1 April 1475 and proved 10 November 1480, he requested burial in the chapel of the Blessed Virgin at Bampton, Devon, next to the tomb of his mother, the Lady Thomasine. He left the residue of his estate to his wife, Elizabeth Dynham, whom he made his sole executrix.

Dugdale, quoting the will of Fulk Bourchier, shows that his father, William Bourchier, and his mother, Thomasine Hankford, are also buried at Bampton, as he bequeathed his body to be buried at Bampton near the grave of his mother, Lady Thomasine, and he willed that marble stones with inscriptions should be placed on his own grave and that of his father, Lord William, and his mother, Lady Thomasine.

== Notes ==
Peerage of England
Preceded by Thomasine Hankeford	Baron FitzWarin; 1453–1479	Succeeded by John Bourchier
