= List of heirs to the English and British thrones =

List of heirs to the English and British thrones may refer to:

- List of heirs to the English throne (1066–1707)
- List of heirs to the British throne (1707–present)
- History of the English and British line of succession
