= My Lady Jane =

British television series

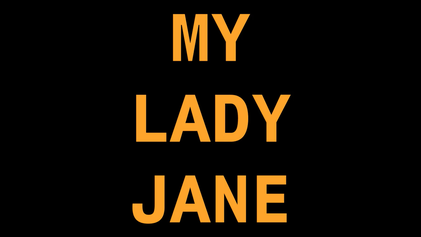
- Genre: Historical fantasy; Tudor romance
- Created by: Gemma Burgess
- Based on: My Lady Jane by: Jodi Meadows; Brodi Ashton; Cynthia Hand
- Showrunners: Gemma Burgess; Meredith Glynn
- Directed by: Jamie Babbit; Stefan Schwartz
- Starring: Emily Bader; Edward Bluemel; Anna Chancellor; Rob Brydon; Jordan Peters; Kate O'Flynn; Abbie Hern; Henry Ashton; Dominic Cooper; Jim Broadbent
- Narrated by: Oliver Chris
- Music by: Rael Jones
- Countries of origin: United Kingdom; United States
- Original language: English
- No. of series: 1
- No. of episodes: 8

Production
- Executive producers: Meredith Glynn; Gemma Burgess; Sarah Bradshaw; Jamie Babbit; Laurie Macdonald; Walter F. Parkes
- Producer: Paula McBreen
- Cinematography: Maja Zamojda
- Production companies: Parkes+MacDonald Image Nation; Picrow; Amazon MGM Studios

Original release
- Network: Amazon Prime Video
- Release: 27 June 2024

My Lady Jane (titled My Queen Jane on screen for episodes four through six) is a historical fantasy romance television series made for Amazon Prime Video, starring Emily Bader as the titular character. Produced by MacDonald & Parkes, the television series is adapted by Gemma Burgess from a novel by Jodi Meadows, Brodi Ashton, and Cynthia Hand that provides a fantasy reimagining of the life of Lady Jane Grey.

All episodes of the series were released on June 27, 2024. In August that year, Amazon cancelled My Lady Jane after one season. The cancellation inspired backlash and a petition, including from fantasy author and A Song of Ice and Fire creator George R.R. Martin.

== Synopsis ==
In an alternative 16th-century England, Lady Jane Grey is coerced by her mother into marrying Lord Guildford Dudley. Jane, as cousin to Edward VI, is in line to the throne. The world of My Lady Jane is inhabited by Ethians, humans who can take animal form, as well as ordinary humans, known as Verity. In England, the Verity ruling class have driven Ethians out of society; in response, Ethians have formed a group called the Pack.

== Cast ==
=== Main ===
- Emily Bader as Lady Jane Grey
- Edward Bluemel as Lord Guildford Dudley
- Anna Chancellor as Lady Frances Grey
- Rob Brydon as John Dudley, 1st Duke of Northumberland, Guildford's father
- Jordan Peters as King Edward VI
- Kate O'Flynn as Princess Mary
- Abbie Hern as Princess Bess
- Henry Ashton as Lord Stan Dudley, Guildford's brother
- Oliver Chris as the Author (voiceover role)
- Dominic Cooper as Lord Seymour
- Jim Broadbent as the Duke of Leicester

=== Recurring ===
- Isabella Brownson as Lady Katherine Grey, Jane's younger sister
- Robyn Betteridge as Lady Margaret Grey, Jane's youngest sister
- Máiréad Tyers as Susannah, an Ethian who becomes a high ranking member of the Pack
- Christian Patterson as Charles
- Michael Workéyè as Archer, leader of the Pack
- Tallulah Greive as Petunia, an Ethian working for Granny
- Joe Klocek as Fitz, an Ethian thief
- Brandon Grace as William Seymour
- Harry Trevaldwyn as George
- Barbara Marten as Granny
- Will Keen as the Duke of Norfolk
- Kevin Eldon as Dr Butts
- Stewart Scudamore as Rupert, Guildford's horsegroom
- Jason Forbes as Scrope, a nobleman

== Episodes ==
No.	Title	Directed by	Written by	Original release date
1	"Who'll Be the Next in Line?"	Jamie Babbit	Gemma Burgess	June 27, 2024
When Jane's father Henry Grey (Note: Historically, Jane's father was executed after Jane.) dies without a male heir, his great uncle the Duke of Leicester inherits everything. Leicester wants Jane to marry Lord Guildford Dudley. Jane and her maid Susannah attempt to flee Jane's forced marriage to Guildford, but are captured. Susannah escapes, revealing herself to be an Ethian. King Edward VI prepares his will, secretly naming Jane as his heir. Edward's dog, Petunia, reveals herself as an Ethian, sent to protect Edward by his great-grandmother. Edward learns that he is not, as he thought, suffering from an illness known as the Affliction, but instead is being slowly poisoned. At the marriage ceremony, Jane feigns illness.
2	"Wild Thing"	Jamie Babbit	Gemma Burgess	June 27, 2024
Jane completes the marriage ceremony with Guildford. She learns that Guildford is an Ethian, but is unable to control his changes and instead is a man by night and a horse by day. He begs her to discover a cure. Edward finds a merchant selling tofana. Mary and Seymour plot to speed up Edward's death. Seymour accuses Lord Dudley of being Edward's poisoner and Dudley is sent to the Tower of London.
3	"With a Girl Like You"	Jamie Babbit	Shepard Boucher & Gemma Burgess & Meredith Glynn	June 27, 2024
Edward disappears, and it is assumed that he threw himself from a high window in despair at his illness. Jane and Guildford travel into the woods to free Susannah after receiving an anonymous ransom note. Seymour sends soldiers to kill Jane and Guildford. Jane learns that the note was a ploy to get money for Ethians. She and Guildford escape the murder attempt. Jane is named queen. Jane's younger sister Katherine marries the Duke of Leicester. Margaret, Jane's youngest sister, suffocates him to death with a pear. Frances covers up the murder.
4	"Bluebird Is Dead"	Jamie Babbit	Cathy Lew	June 27, 2024
Jane and Guildford discover proof that Mary and Seymour colluded to murder Edward. When Jane confronts Mary, Mary attacks Jane and destroys the proof. Frances witnesses Guildford changing into a horse.
5	"I'm Gonna Change the World"	Stefan Schwartz	Bisanne Masoud	June 27, 2024
Lady Margaret Beaufort, Edward's great-grandmother and now a member of a religious order, nurses Edward back to health. Lord Dudley pressures Jane to name Guildford as her king. Mary agrees to make Lord Norfolk her chancellor when she is on the throne in exchange for the use of Norfolk's army. Jane disbands the Kingsland guards and invites the Ethians to attend her coronation banquet. After being threatened by Frances, Jane consummates her marriage to Guildford. Bess tries to flee with Petunia but is captured by Seymour. Margaret tells Edward that he is an Ethian, just as she is. Jane tells Guildford that his Ethianism cannot be cured.
6	"I Feel Free"	Stefan Schwartz	Alyssa Lerner	June 27, 2024
Mary, facing arrest, has fled. Guildford runs away with an Ethian who promises him a cure. Archer, a representative of the Ethians, saves Jane from an assassination attempt. Edward, unable to switch to an Ethian form, realizes Margaret is insane when she tells him of her plan to exterminate all Verity, and escapes with the help of Fitz, an Ethian. Archer and Norfolk wager the fate of the oppressive Division Law on a bowling match; Archer wins. Guildford is attacked by his Ethian companion but escapes. Jane abolishes the Division Law. Mary, Norfolk, and Seymour take over the palace and arrest Jane.
7	"Another Girl, Another Planet"	Stefan Schwartz	Gemma Burgess & Meredith Glynn	June 27, 2024
Jane is placed under house arrest. Guildford sneaks past the guards to rescue Jane, but she refuses to leave with him because her family is being held hostage by Mary. Jane's trial on charges of high treason begins. Bess rises to support Jane's claim that she was fulfilling the orders of the king's will. Edward sneaks into the palace and surprises Jane when she is taken to her room. Jane sends him away to raise an army so he can fight Mary. Although the council finds Jane innocent on the charges, Seymour’s guards capture Guildford after their meeting. Mary and Seymour bring in the groom Rupert, who has been tortured to reveal that Guildford is Ethian, and then Guildford (in horse form) himself. Jane and Guildford are condemned to death for violating the reinstated Division Law.
8	"God Save the Queen"	Jamie Babbit	Gemma Burgess & Meredith Glynn	June 27, 2024
Jane is taken to the Tower of London. Mary kills Norfolk when he criticizes her tyrannical behavior. Edward and Fitz beg the Ethians to help fight against Mary. At Jane and Guildford's execution, flying Ethians attack Jane's executioner and guards. Jane, freed by Susannah, rushes through the crowd to untie Guildford from the stake before fire reaches him, but is unable to undo the knots. Guildford is finally able to control his change. Lord Dudley and Stan clear a path for Jane to ride free on Guildford's back. In an epilogue, Bess is shown to secretly be an Ethian. Frances and Katherine remain Mary's hostages. Stan and Frances resume their relationship. Katherine clandestinely marries Lord Seymour's son William. Fitz and Edward kiss. Jane and Guildford agree to take back the throne.

== Production ==
=== Development ===
The series is based on the historical young adult novels by Brodi Ashton, Cynthia Hand and Jodi Meadows. Production company Parkes & MacDonald produced the series with Gemma Burgess and Meredith Glynn as co-showrunner and executive producers, and Jamie Babbit directing the pilot and executive producer, whilst Sarah Bradshaw and Laurie MacDonald are executive producers. Eight episodes were ordered for season one of the series.

In mid-August 2024, it was reported that the series had been canceled.

=== Casting ===
In November 2022, Anna Chancellor, Rob Brydon, Dominic Cooper and Jim Broadbent were announced to have supporting roles as aristocrats.

=== Filming ===
Principal photography took place in the UK in 2022 ahead of a projected late 2023 release. In November 2022, filming was reported at Great Chalfield Manor, standing in for the Greys' residence Bradgate House, and Herstmonceux Castle in East Sussex, standing in for Hampton Court Palace. Production designer Will Hughes-Jones initially intended to use the real Hampton Court, but found its architecture had evolved too much since the 16th-century, whereas Herstmonceux "looks more like Hampton Court did back then than it does now". Still, the grounds of Hampton Court were used in the series for outdoor scenes. Hughes-Jones selected Broughton Castle for the Dudleys' residence. Other filming locations included Dover Castle, Dorney Court, Hatfield House, Ashridge, Chiltern Open Air Museum, Langley Park, St Bartholomew-the-Great, St Etheldreda's Hatfield, and Crossways Farm.

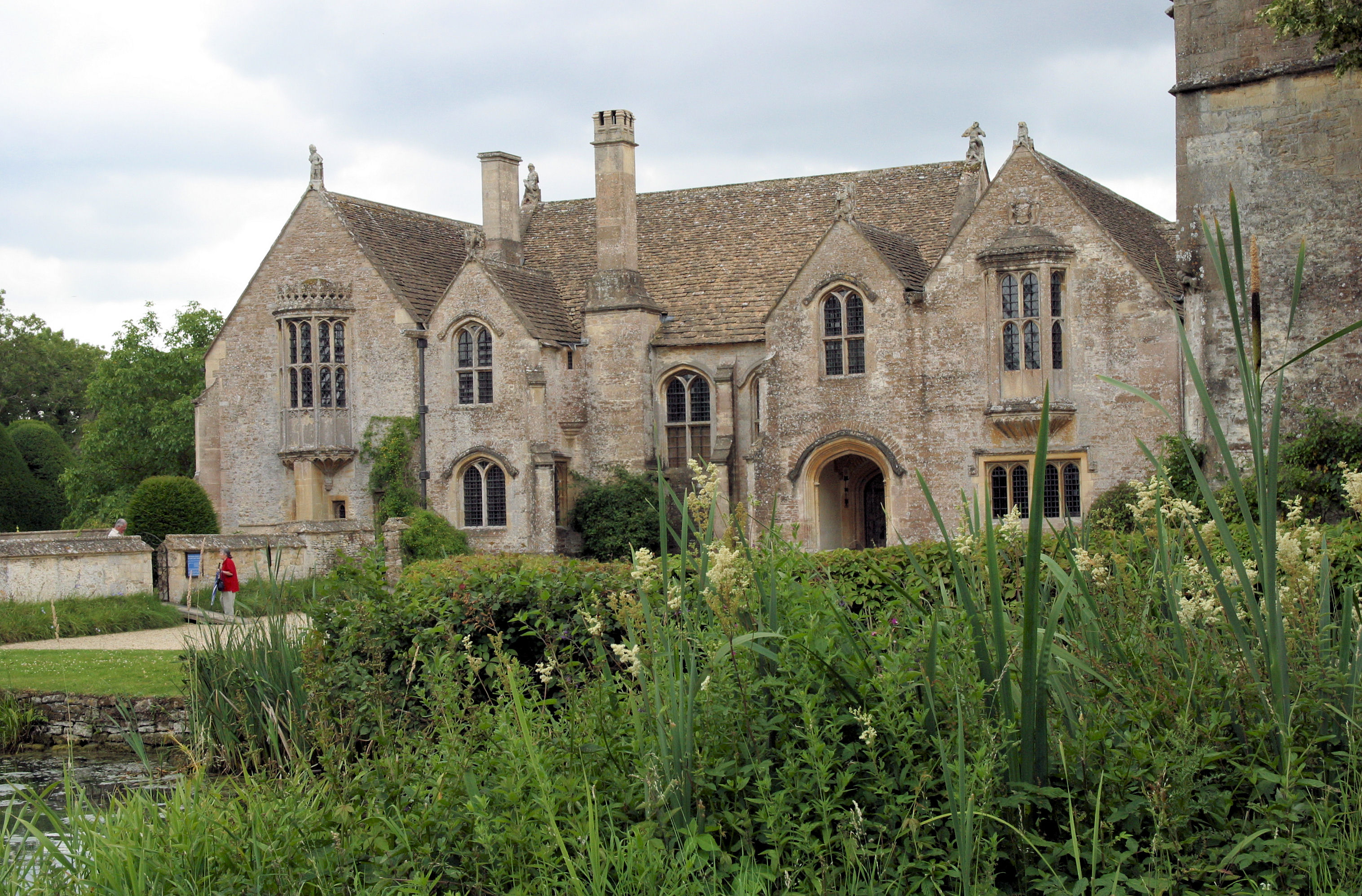
Great Chalfield Manor

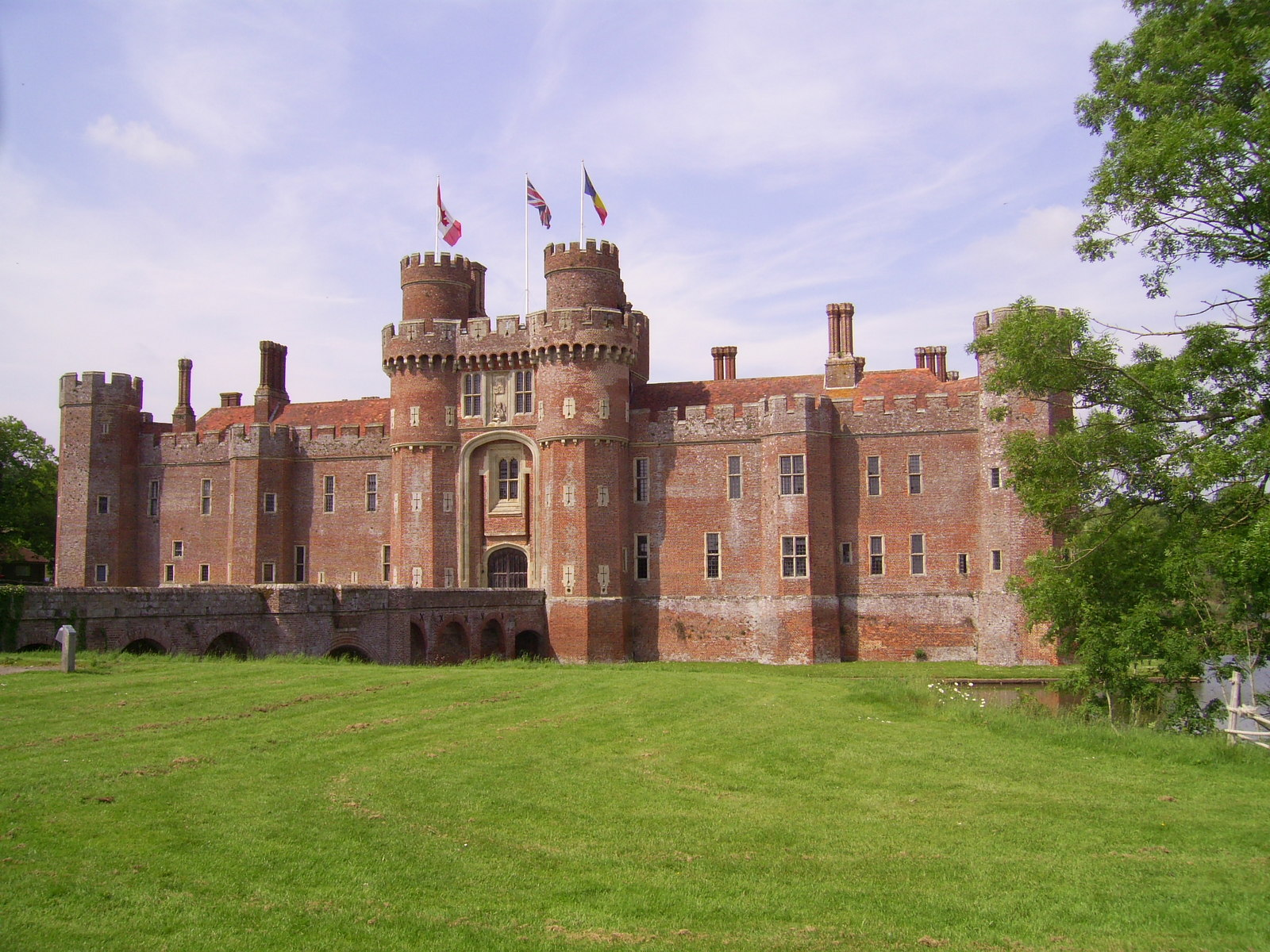
Herstmonceux Castle

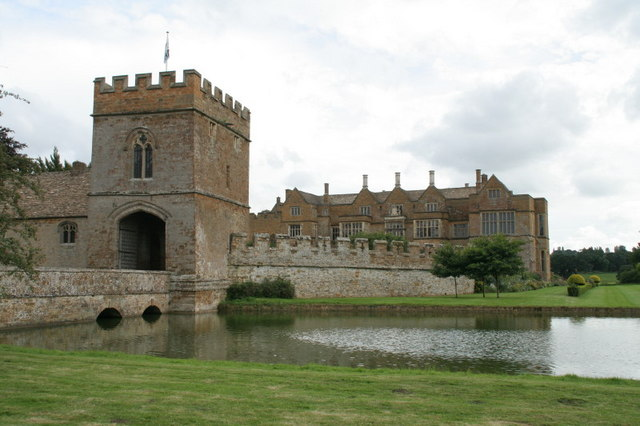
Broughton Castle

== Release ==
The series had its world premiere at the 2024 Tribeca Film Festival on 12 June 2024, and was streamed on Amazon Prime Video on 27 June 2024.

=== Music ===
The soundtrack features classic British rock covers performed by current British women rock musicians.

My Lady Jane (Prime Video Original Series Score)

Soundtrack album by Rael Jones
- Released: 27 June 2024
- Length: 1 hour 4 minutes
- Label: Milan Records

My Lady Jane (Prime Video Original Series Score) track listing
No.	Title	Length
1.	"Jane's Escape"	1:33
2.	"My Lady Jane"	2:33
3.	"Quite Contrary"	2:17
4.	"Never Say Die"	2:19
5.	"Gurdy Two Shoes"	2:04
6.	"Prettier When You Smile"	1:45
7.	"The Tavern Heist"	2:04
8.	"New Life"	1:11
9.	"King Edward"	1:14
10.	"Lust at First Sight"	0:35
11.	"Jane in Court"	2:29
12.	"Your Majesty"	1:31
13.	"Manacled"	4:12
14.	"Tofana"	2:30
15.	"Lyre Lyre Pants on Fire"	2:05
16.	"Two Legs or Four"	1:18
17.	"Guildford"	2:04
18.	"Execution"	1:32
19.	"Another Heart Whispers Back"	4:30
20.	"Transformation"	3:00
21.	"Follow that Barge"	2:07
22.	"Micromanaging"	1:47
23.	"Lambkins"	3:21
24.	"Target Practice"	2:41
25.	"Unshackled"	2:35
26.	"Will for Succession"	5:03
27.	"Change This Country"	3:02
28.	"Swashbuckling"	4:48
29.	"Showtrial"	3:08
30.	"Previously on My Lady Jane"	1:25
31.	"Jane's Escape - Reprise"	1:30
Total length:		1 hour 4 minutes

My Lady Jane (Prime Video Original Series Soundtrack)

Soundtrack album by Various Artists
- Released: 27 June 2024
- Length: 27 minutes
- Label: Milan Records

My Lady Jane (Prime Video Original Series Soundtrack) track listing
No.	Title	Artist(s)	Length
1.	"Tainted Love"	Goat Girl	2:55
2.	"Wild Thing"	Black Honey	2:28
3.	"I'm a Man"	Lizzie Esau	2:17
4.	"She's Not There"	Griff	2:00
5.	"The Chain"	CHINCHILLA	3:45
6.	"Dreamer"	Katy J Pearson	3:54
7.	"Sail Away"	HotWax	3:44
8.	"Ever Fallen in Love"	Yonaka	3:00
9.	"I Feel Free (Amazon Music Original)"	Poppy Ajudha	3:03
Total length:			27 minutes

== Reception ==
On review aggregator Rotten Tomatoes, the series holds a 94% score, based on 36 reviews with an average rating of 7.0/10. The website's critics consensus reads, "A romp-antasy for revisionary souls, My Lady Jane has her cake and slays it too." On Metacritic, the series holds a weighted average score of 71 out 100 based on reviews from 12 critics, indicating "generally favorable" reviews.
