= Lizzie Esau =

English musician (born 1999)

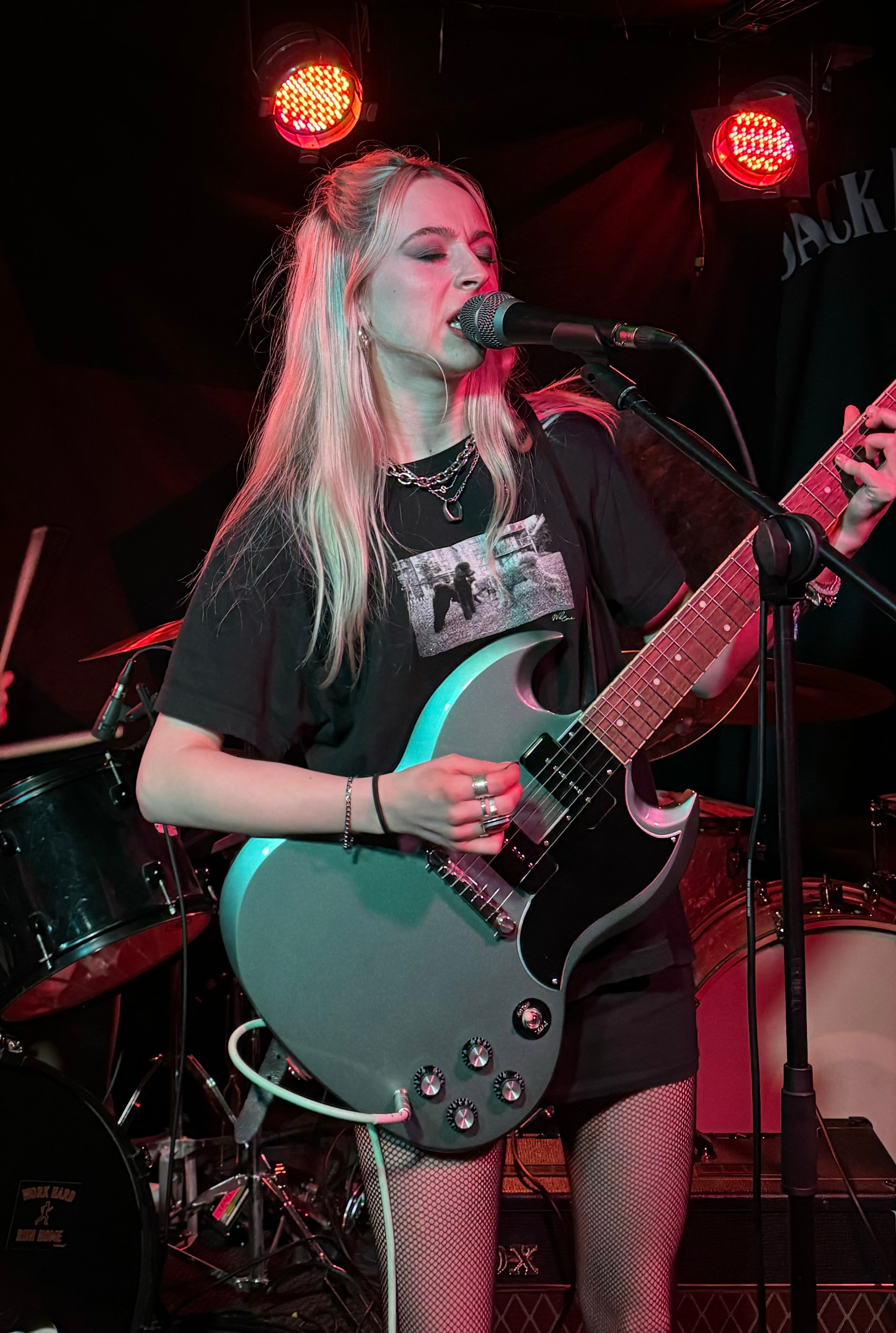
- Lizzie Esau performing in Birmingham, 2024

Background information
- Born: Elizabeth Jane Esau; 17 November 1999 (age 26); London, England
- Origin: Newcastle upon Tyne, England
- Genres: Indie rock; Alternative rock; Pop rock
- Occupations: Singer; songwriter
- Instruments: Vocals, Electric guitar, Acoustic guitar
- Years active: 2020–present
- Label: LAB Records

Elizabeth Jane Esau (/ˈiːsɔː/ EE-saw; born 17 November 1999), better known as Lizzie Esau; is an English musician who began gigging and releasing music in 2020, usually in the indie rock or alternative rock genres. The daughter of Tim Esau of the band IQ, she has opened for Baby Queen, Beabadoobee, the Amazons, Upsahl, and Swim School. Her releases include "Bitter Weather", which went viral on TikTok, a cover version of the Yardbirds's version of "I'm a Man" recorded for the soundtrack of My Lady Jane, and the EPs Perspectives, Deepest Blue, Spilling Out The Truth. In addition, she is the subject of an article in The Courier that was shortlisted for Best Arts and Culture Piece at the 2023 Student Publication Association National Awards.

== Life and career ==
=== 1999–2022: Early life and Perspectives ===
Elizabeth Jane Esau (/ˈiːsɔː/ EE-saw) was born in November 1999 (Note: For her middle name, see.; For the pronunciation of her surname, see.; For November, see.; For the fact that she was 23 in September 2023, see.) in London but grew up in Ryton, Tyne and Wear. Her mother is an artist and her father is Tim Esau, a member of IQ. She began writing poems aged five before diversifying into plays and studied architecture at Newcastle University. She began uploading content to SoundCloud in the late 2010s and started playing open mic nights in early 2020, just before the COVID-19 pandemic in the United Kingdom. She played a socially distanced gig at Tyne Bank Brewery in September 2020.

Her first single, "Young Minds Run Blind", was released in November 2020 and written about her experiences of youth, while her second, "Haven't You Heard", was released in 2021, having taken several years to complete. That June, she released "What If I Just Kept Driving", a lo-fi bedroom pop track about using mundane tasks as coping mechanisms. She followed with her fourth single "Caffeine", an indie rock track about justifying decisions, and the alt-pop and hip-hop blend "Bitter Weather", which she wrote around the same time as "Caffeine" and about prioritising important things. "Bitter Weather" appeared on her 2022 EP Perspectives and went viral on TikTok.

=== 2022–2023: Deepest Blue ===
By the end of that month, she had appeared on Spotify's "Fresh Finds" playlist and had performed at Newcastle's "A Stone's Throw" festival and BBC Radio 1's Big Weekend. In August 2022, she performed at Newcastle's "Live At Central" beer garden, from which Finlay Holden of Clash opined that "Bitter Weather" and "The Enemy" were highlights. The following month, she released "Bleak Sublime", a track about an inability to replicate drunk euphoria while sober. In October 2022, Esau played "Left of the Dial" Festival in Rotterdam and Live at Leeds. The month after, she released "Stay on the Phone", an acoustic track about the various safety measures women take to preserve their safety while walking home at night and living in cities and about victimisation of abuse survivors. By the end of that year, she had supported Baby Queen, Beabadoobee, The Amazons, and Upsahl on tour.

In January 2023, she released "Jellyfish", a track about being easy to influence, and began co-headlining a tour with George O'Hanlon. In March 2023, an article about Esau published in The Courier was shortlisted for Best Arts and Culture Piece at the Student Publication Association National Awards. She signed to LAB Records. In June, she provided backing vocals on Chloe and the Brainwaves's "Expensive Things", which she followed with the EP Deepest Blue in July 2023. She then played a gig at The Louisiana in Bristol, with the bands Clemencie and Wynona supporting.

=== 2024–present: Spilling Out the Truth ===
In January 2024, she released "Impossible + Strange", an indie rock track about being made mentally ill by anticipation. She then played a gig at The Poetry Club in Glasgow as well as at Stockton Calling. In April, she released "Wait Too Late", a track about the environment she had previously opened several concerts with and had written around the time the Amazon rainforest was suffering from fires. She recorded the track at Somerton Castle, having aborted two previous attempts at recording the track as she felt unable to replicate her live sound in a studio. She then supported Swim School on their Seeing It Now tour and played a set at Dot to Dot Festival.

In June 2024, Esau released "Cool", which discussed impostor syndrome. Later that month, she contributed a cover version of The Yardbirds's version of Bo Diddley's 1955 song "I'm a Man" to the soundtrack of My Lady Jane, a series about the 1553 Queen Lady Jane Grey. (Note: For the fact that "I'm a Man" was originally by Bo Diddley and was released in 1955, see.; For everything else, see.) The song was one of nine cover versions on its soundtrack and had been specially commissioned for the series as its showrunners Gemma Burgess and Meredith Glynn were fans of bands of the British Invasion. Esau also played Glastonbury Festival that month, headlining the BBC Introducing stage. That October, she and the rock band Torus supported South Arcade on tour and released the EP Spilling Out the Truth, which took its name from how open its lyrics were. Spilling Out the Truth contained "She's a Scorpio", a track mostly written several years earlier and about her experiences of being gaslighted during a teenage relationship.

== Artistry ==
Esau's early works were inspired by Imogen Heap, while "Haven't You Heard" was inspired by Heap and by Phoebe Bridgers' "Kyoto". She cited Heap and Dave as influences in November 2020. "Bitter Weather"'s verses were inspired by Clairo, Loyle Carner, and Tom Misch, while its choruses were inspired by Wolf Alice and Royal Blood. "Stay on the phone" was inspired by the murder of Sarah Everard and the activist speeches she heard while she was at university, while "Wait Too Late" was inspired by The Stone Roses's "Fools Gold". She cited Wolf Alice, Nothing but Thieves, Holly Humberstone, Beabadoobee, and Little Simz as influences in September 2021 and Wolf Alice, Beabadoobee, and Radiohead in January 2023, although by May 2024 she was citing Wolf Alice, Foals, The Killers, Kings of Leon, and Florence and the Machine. The month after, she wrote that several of her songs were inspired by Mazzy Star's "Fade into You", Pixies's "Debaser", and Wolf Alice's "Beautifully Unconventional". Michael O'Neill of Narc wrote in June 2021 that her works traversed "piano ballads, spoken word, indie pop, and R&B", while her music was described as "alternative rock" by Graeme Smith of York Calling in April 2023.

== Members ==
- Lizzie Esau – vocals, guitar

=== Live members ===
- Shaun "Chippy" Chipp – guitar
- Joe Bennison – bass
- Alex Baker – drums
- Robb Maynard - drums

== Awards and accolades ==
=== Lists ===
Publisher	Listicle	Year (Note: Indicates the year of ceremony. Each year is linked to the article about the awards held that year, wherever possible.)	Result	Ref.
Dork	"Hype List 2023"	2022	Included	

== Discography ==
=== Extended plays ===
List of EPs, with selected details
Title	Details
Perspectives	Released: 11 November 2022; Format: Digital download, streaming
Deepest Blue	Released: 21 July 2023; Format: Digital download, streaming
Spilling Out The Truth	Released: 11 October 2024; Format: Digital download, streaming, LP; Label: LAB Records

=== Singles ===
Title	Year	Album	Ref.
"Young Minds Run Blind"	2020	Non-album singles	
"Haven't You Heard?"	2021	Non-album singles	
"What If I Just Kept Driving"	2021	Perspectives	
"Caffeine"	2021	Perspectives	
"Bitter Weather"	2021	Perspectives	
"Shade of Green"	2022	Perspectives	
"The Enemy"	2022	Perspectives	
"Bleak Sublime"	2022	Deepest Blue	
"Stay on the Phone"	2022	Perspectives	
"Jellyfish"	2023	Deepest Blue	
"Killer"	2023	Deepest Blue	
"Impossible + Strange"	2024	Spilling Out The Truth	
"Wait Too Late"	2024	Spilling Out The Truth	
"Cool"	2024	Spilling Out The Truth	

=== Other songs ===
Title	Year	Album	Ref.
"I'm a Man"	2024	My Lady Jane soundtrack	

=== Other appearances ===
Title	Year	Artist	Album	Ref.
"Expensive Things"	2023	Chloe and the Brainwaves	Non-album single	
"Staying Up"	2023	Ernie	Cold Cuts	

== Music videos ==
Title	Year	Ref.
"What If I Just Kept Driving"	2021	
"Caffeine"	2021	
"Bitter Weather"	2021	
"Shade of Green"	2022	
"The Enemy"	2022	
"Bleak Sublime"	2022	
"Stay on the Phone"	2022	
"Jellyfish"	2023	
"Lazy Brain"	2023	
"Cool"	2024	
"She's a Scorpio"	2024	

== Tours ==
=== Supporting ===
- James Marriott – Bitter Tour (2023)
- Swim School – Seeing It Now Tour (2024)
