= Gemma Burgess =

Australian novelist

- Born: Australia
- Years active: 2009–present
- Website: www.gemmaburgess.com

Gemma Burgess is a novelist, screenwriter, and showrunner. She was one of the inaugural new adult authors picked up by St. Martin's Press. Her novels include Brooklyn Girls. More recently, she created the historical fantasy romance television series My Lady Jane (2024) for Amazon Prime that reimagines the life of Lady Jane Grey.

== Early life and education ==
Burgess moved around growing up, mostly between Australia, Hong Kong, and Singapore. She holds dual Australian and British citizenship. Burgess attended a French international school. She went on to triple major in English, History and Theatre at a university in Sydney followed by a Journalism course. At 22, she moved to London, where she worked as a copywriter. She has since lived in Zurich, New York, and London.

== Career ==
After getting a book deal with Harper Collins, Burgess published Brooklyn Girls in 2012. Love And Chaos was published in 2013, with the next volume The Wild One was released on 2015. She is also the author of A Girl Like You and The Dating Detox. Her novels have been translated into seven languages and are available in over 40 countries.

On 5 October 2020, Burgess signed with the UTA to develop two projects for Amazon. These projects included an adaptation of the historical fantasy adventure novel My Lady Jane by Cynthia Hand, Brodi Ashton and Jodi Meadows. Burgess had discovered the novel seeing someone reading it on the New York subway in New York City and took it to Parkes and MacDonald to produce.

Starring Emily Bader and Edward Bluemel, the series was released in June 2024 to critical acclaim. It was cancelled that August. The cancellation inspired a fan campaign to save the series, supported by George R. R. Martin, including a petition that garnered over 90 thousand signatures within a month.
