= The Pact (British TV series) =

British television series for BBC One

- Genre: Drama; Thriller
- Created by: Pete McTighe
- Written by: Pete McTighe; Joy Wilkinson
- Directed by: Rebecca Johnson; Eric Styles; Nicole Volavka
- Starring: Laura Fraser; Julie Hesmondhalgh; Eiry Thomas; Heledd Gwynn; Jason Hughes; Aneurin Barnard; Gabrielle Creevy; Aled ap Steffan; Abbie Hern; Rakie Ayola; Mark Lewis Jones; Adrian Edmondson; Eddie Marsan
- Composer: Mac Quayle
- Country of origin: United Kingdom (Wales)
- Original language: English
- No. of series: 2
- No. of episodes: 12

Production
- Executive producers: Hayley Manning; Pete McTighe; Elwen Rowlands
- Producers: Catrin Lewis Defis; Adam Knopf
- Production company: Little Door Productions

Original release
- Network: BBC One
- Release: 17 May 2021 – 28 November 2022

The Pact is a British television drama series written and created by Pete McTighe and made and filmed in Wales. Produced by Little Door Productions, it began broadcasting on BBC One on 17 May 2021. On 6 April 2022, a second series was announced, focusing on a new cast and story, which premiered on 24 October 2022.

== Synopsis ==
=== Series 1 ===
Four friends, Anna, Nancy, Cat and Louie, work in a 100-year-old family brewery in mid-Wales. The owner, Louie's brother Arwel, has recently retired and has put his son, Jack, in charge. Jack is a cocaine addict and treats his staff with contempt. During the centenary party, the four abduct the drunken, stoned Jack and drive him to the woods. They photograph him in a partly undressed pose then leave. When they return to check on him, they find him dead. They make a pact not to disclose their involvement.

=== Series 2 ===
The second series focuses on a new cast and story. Christine, a social worker, and her children Will, Jamie and Megan are trying to move on from the death of a fourth sibling, Liam, through overdose. However, a stranger comes to town claiming a connection to each of them; this tests their family loyalties.

== Cast and characters ==
=== Series 1 ===
- Laura Fraser as Anna
- Julie Hesmondhalgh as Nancy
- Eiry Thomas as Louie
- Heledd Gwynn as Cat
- Eddie Marsan as Arwel
- Jason Hughes as Max
- Aneurin Barnard as Jack
- Adrian Edmondson as Richard
- Rakie Ayola as Detective Superintendent Holland
- Gabrielle Creevy as Tamsin
- Aled ap Steffan as Ryan
- Abbie Hern as Tish
- Alexandria Riley as Detective Constable Anford
- Mark Lewis Jones as Father Martin
- Richard Elis as Gareth
- Ben McGregor as Detective Constable Griffiths
- Sophie Melville as Mandy Thomas
- Elin Phillips as Rose

=== Series 2 ===
- Rakie Ayola as Christine Rees
- Jordan Wilks as Connor Moran/Liam Rees
- Mali Ann Rees as Megan Rees
- Lloyd Everitt as Will Rees
- Aaron Anthony as Jamie Rees
- Lisa Palfrey as Beth
- Jacob Ifan as Gethin
- Rebekah Murrell as Samantha
- Kristy Phillips as Kayla
- Christian Patterson as Joe
- Matthew Gravelle as D.S Pritchard
- Elizabeth Berrington as Kate
- Callum Hymers as Owain
- Huw Novelli as Lloyd
- Nick Hywell as Alec
- Marsha Miller as Carol
- Steven Mackintosh as Harry
- Kaylen Luke as Alfie

== Episodes ==
Series overview
Series	Episodes	Originally released	
Series	Episodes	First released	Last released
1	6	17 May 2021	1 June 2021
2	6	24 October 2022	28 November 2022

=== Series 1 (2021) ===
No.	Title	Directed by	Written by	Original release date	U.K. viewers (millions)
1	"Episode 1"	Eric Styles	Pete McTighe	17 May 2021	7.54
Four female friends who work at a brewery go to its 100th anniversary party. Afterwards, finding that their obnoxious, abusive young boss Jack has tried to assault one of the women, they abduct him and dump him in the woods. Later they go back to check that he is all right and find him dead.
2	"Episode 2"	Eric Styles	Pete McTighe	18 May 2021	6.88
The four friends are interviewed by the police but say nothing. Anna’s husband, Max, a police sergeant, is part of the investigation. The friends each receive a blackmail demand and Anna pays it.
3	"Episode 3"	Eric Styles	Pete McTighe	24 May 2021	5.44
Max discovers that Anna has withdrawn their savings from the bank and she pretends she has lent it to one of her friends. After the blackmailer demands more money Anna tracks down the messages to Nancy's phone.
4	"Episode 4"	Rebecca Johnson	Pete McTighe	25 May 2021	5.31
CCTV footage reveals to the police that Nancy’s car was travelling in the direction of the woods on the night of Jack's murder. Nancy reveals that her husband, Richard, has incurred huge gambling debts and the blackmail attempt was intended to obtain a temporary respite so that they would not lose their home.
5	"Episode 5"	Rebecca Johnson	Pete McTighe	31 May 2021	4.53
Nancy is held overnight by the police. Anna and the other friends are questioned.
6	"Episode 6"	Rebecca Johnson	Pete McTighe	1 June 2021	4.48
The truth of who killed Jack is revealed.

=== Series 2 (2022) ===
No.	Title	Directed by	Written by	Original release date	U.K. viewers (millions)
1	"Episode 1"	Nicole Volavka	Pete McTighe	24 October 2022	N/A
2	"Episode 2"	Nicole Volavka	Pete McTighe	31 October 2022	N/A
3	"Episode 3"	Nicole Volavka	Pete McTighe	7 November 2022	N/A
4	"Episode 4"	Christiana Ebohon-Green	Joy Wilkinson	14 November 2022	N/A
5	"Episode 5"	Christiana Ebohon-Green	Joy Wilkinson	21 November 2022	N/A
6	"Episode 6"	Christiana Ebohon-Green	Pete McTighe	28 November 2022	N/A

== Production ==
Production of the first series of The Pact began in September 2020 and filming took place on location at the Rhymney Brewery, Blaenavon, the Brecon Beacons National Park, the Pontsarn Viaduct, Merthyr Tydfil, the Pontsticill Reservoir, Whitecross Street in Monmouth, and St Mary's Church, Marshfield in Newport, Wales.

Series 2 was filmed in Cardiff and on the Vale of Glamorgan coast. The Rees family home was in Llantwit Major, with other coastal scenes being filmed in Ogmore-by-Sea and other scenes take place at Llantwit Major Beach and Dunraven Bay. Filming also took place in Penarth, Penarth Pier, Porthcawl, Swanbridge Bay Beach and Barry, Vale of Glamorgan.

== Broadcast ==
The first series of The Pact was broadcast every Monday and Tuesday on BBC One between 17 May 2021 and 1 June 2021.

The second series was broadcast every Monday on BBC One between 24 October 2022 and 28 November 2022.

== Reception ==
Writing for The Guardian, Rebecca Nicholson gave the first series three out of five stars, stating that it saw "a starry cast and a hint of mystery". The Independent critic Sean O'Grady awarded four out of five stars, praising the "strong" writing and cast, but stating that "the premise does seem far-fetched." Anita Singh of The Daily Telegraph wrote similarly of The Pact, describing it as a "Welsh Big Little Lies" where "realism wasn't a high priority".

Alison Rowat in The Herald found series 2 “as gripping as the first one”. Jesper Rees in The Daily Telegraph criticised the soundtrack “which omnipresently pumps out dull doomy chords in the background, a bit like musical cloud cover. Talking of clouds, the shoot in picturesque spots such as Penarth and Margam Abbey seems to have happened under Glamorgan’s very greyest skies.”
