= List of heirs to the English throne =

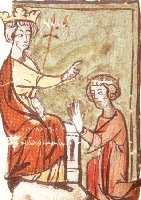
In 1301, Edward I made his son Edward the Prince of Wales and declared him to be his heir.

This is a list of the individuals who were, at any given time, considered the next in line to inherit the throne of England, should the incumbent monarch die. Those who actually succeeded (at any future time) are shown in bold. Stillborn children and infants surviving less than a month are not included.

It may be noted that the succession was highly uncertain, and was not governed by a fixed convention, for much of the century after the Norman Conquest of 1066.

Significant breaks in the succession, where the designated heir did not in fact succeed (due to usurpation, conquest, revolution, or lack of heirs) are shown as breaks in the table below.

== 1066 to 1135: The Normans ==
Heir	Status	Relationship to Monarch	Became heir Reason	Ceased to be heir Reason	Monarch
No recognised heir 1066–1087					William I
William "Rufus"	Heir apparent	Son	7 September 1087; Proclaimed heir	26 September 1087; Became king	William I
No recognised heir 1087–1100					William II
No recognised heir 1100–1116					Henry I
William Adelin, Duke of Normandy	Heir apparent	Son	19 March 1116; Proclaimed heir	25 November 1120; Died	Henry I
No recognised heir 1120–1126					Henry I
Matilda, Countess of Anjou	Heiress presumptive	Daughter	25 December 1126; Proclaimed heiress	22 December 1135; Throne usurped by first cousin Stephen, Count of Boulogne	Henry I

== 1135 to 1154: The Blois ==
Heir	Status	Relationship to Monarch	Became heir Reason	Ceased to be heir Reason	Monarch
No recognised heir 1135–1152					Stephen
Eustace IV, Count of Boulogne	Heir apparent	Son	6 April 1152; Proclaimed heir	17 August 1153; Died	Stephen
No recognised heir Aug–Nov 1153					Stephen
Henry "Curtmantle", Duke of Normandy	Heir apparent	First cousin once-removed	6 November 1153; Proclaimed heir	19 December 1154; Became king	Stephen

== 1154 to 1485: The Plantagenets ==
Heir	Status	Relationship to Monarch	Became heir Reason	Ceased to be heir Reason	Monarch
No recognised heir 1154–1155					Henry II
William, Count of Poitiers	Heir apparent	Son	3 April 1155; Proclaimed heir	April 1156; Died	Henry II
Henry "the Young King"	Heir apparent	Son	April 1156; Brother died	11 June 1183; Died	Henry II
No recognised heir 1183–1189					Henry II
Richard "the Lionheart", Duke of Aquitaine	Heir apparent	Son	4 July 1189; Proclaimed heir	3 September 1189; Became king	Henry II
No recognised heir 1189–1190					Richard I
Arthur I, Duke of Brittany	Heir presumptive	Nephew	11 November 1190; Proclaimed heir	27 May 1199; John "Lackland" proclaimed king	Richard I
No recognised heir 1199–1207					John
Henry of Winchester	Heir apparent	Son	1 October 1207; Born	28 October 1216; Became king	John
Richard, Earl of Cornwall	Heir presumptive	Brother	28 October 1216; Brother became king	17 June 1239; Son born to king	Henry III
Edward "Longshanks", Lord of Chester	Heir apparent	Son	17 June 1239; Born	20 November 1272; Became king	Henry III
Henry	Heir apparent	Son	20 November 1272; Father became king	14 October 1274; Died	Edward I
Alphonso, Earl of Chester	Heir apparent	Son	14 October 1274; Brother died	19 August 1284; Died	Edward I
Edward of Caernarfon, Prince of Wales	Heir apparent	Son	19 August 1284; Brother died	8 July 1307; Became king	Edward I
Thomas of Brotherton, Earl of Norfolk	Heir presumptive	Half-brother	8 July 1307; Brother became king	13 November 1312; Son born to king	Edward II
Edward of Windsor, Earl of Chester	Heir apparent	Son	13 November 1312; Born	25 January 1327; Father abdicated, became king	Edward II
John of Eltham, Earl of Cornwall	Heir presumptive	Brother	25 January 1327; Brother became king	15 June 1330; Son born to king	Edward III
Edward of Woodstock, Prince of Wales	Heir apparent	Son	15 June 1330; Born	8 June 1376; Died	Edward III
Richard of Bordeaux, Prince of Wales	Heir apparent	Grandson	8 June 1376; Father died	22 June 1377; Became king	Edward III
Since Richard II never designated an heir, the succession was disputed among the heirs established under the will of Edward III and heirs by cognatic primogeniture. The will entailed the throne on the heirs male. The following are the leaders of both lines:					Richard II
John of Gaunt, Duke of Lancaster	Potential heirs by the will of Edward III	Uncle	22 June 1377; Nephew became king	3 February 1399; Died	Richard II
Henry "Bolingbroke", Duke of Lancaster	Potential heirs by the will of Edward III	First cousin	3 February 1399; Father died	30 September 1399; First cousin deposed, became king	Richard II
Philippa Plantagenet, 5th Countess of Ulster	Potential heirs by cognatic primogeniture	First cousin	22 June 1377; First cousin became king	5 January 1382; Died	Richard II
Roger Mortimer, 4th Earl of March	Potential heirs by cognatic primogeniture	First cousin once-removed	5 January 1382; Mother died	20 July 1398; Died	Richard II
Edmund Mortimer, 5th Earl of March	Potential heirs by cognatic primogeniture	First cousin twice-removed	20 July 1398; Father died	30 September 1399; Succession of new king	Richard II
House of Lancaster (1399-1461)
Henry of Monmouth, Prince of Wales	Heir apparent	Son	30 September 1399; Father became king	21 March 1413; Became king	Henry IV
Thomas of Lancaster, Duke of Clarence	Heir presumptive	Brother	20 March 1413; Brother became king	22 March 1421; Died	Henry V
John of Lancaster, Duke of Bedford	Heir presumptive	Brother	22 March 1421; Brother died	6 December 1421; Son born to king	Henry V
Henry of Windsor, Duke of Cornwall	Heir apparent	Son	6 December 1421; Born	1 September 1422; Became king	Henry V
John of Lancaster, Duke of Bedford	Heir presumptive	Uncle	31 August 1422; Nephew became king	14 September 1435; Died	Henry VI
Humphrey of Lancaster, Duke of Gloucester	Heir presumptive	Uncle	14 September 1435; Brother died	23 February 1447; Died	Henry VI
Richard of York, 3rd Duke of York	Heir presumptive	Second cousin once-removed	23 February 1447; Second cousin died	13 October 1453; Son born to king	Henry VI
Edward of Westminster, Prince of Wales	Heir apparent	Son	13 October 1453; Born	25 October 1460; Excluded from succeeding	Henry VI
Richard of York, 3rd Duke of York	Heir apparent	Second cousin once-removed	25 October 1460; Second cousin twice-removed excluded from succeeding	30 December 1460; Killed in battle	Henry VI
Edward of Westminster, Prince of Wales	Heir apparent	Son	30 December 1460; Second cousin twice-removed killed in battle, restored as heir	4 March 1461; Father deposed	Henry VI
House of York (1461-1470)
George Plantagenet, Duke of Clarence	Heir presumptive	Brother	4 March 1461; Brother became king	11 February 1466; Daughter born to king	Edward IV
Elizabeth of York (Note: Although she was never formally proclaimed as such, many historians regard Elizabeth as having become heiress presumptive upon her birth, owing to her father having based his claim on being the most senior descendant of Edward III by way of cognatic primogeniture.)	Heiress presumptive	Daughter	11 February 1466; Born	3 October 1470; Father deposed	Edward IV
House of Lancaster Restored (1470-1471)
Edward of Westminster, Prince of Wales	Heir apparent	Son	3 October 1470; Father restored as king	11 April 1471; Father deposed	Henry VI
House of York Restored (1471-1485)
Edward of York, Prince of Wales	Heir apparent	Son	11 April 1471; Father restored as king	9 April 1483; Became king	Edward IV
Richard of Shrewsbury, Duke of York	Heir presumptive	Brother	9 April 1483; Brother became king	25 June 1483; Brother deposed, both declared illegitimate	Edward V
Edward of Middleham, Prince of Wales	Heir apparent	Son	26 June 1483; Father became king	9 April 1484; Died	Richard III
No recognised heir 1484–1485					Richard III

== 1485 to 1603: The Tudors ==
Heir	Status	Relationship to Monarch	Became heir Reason	Ceased to be heir Reason	Monarch
No recognised heir 1485–1486					Henry VII
Arthur Tudor, Prince of Wales	Heir apparent	Son	20 September 1486; Born	2 April 1502; Died	Henry VII
Henry Tudor, Prince of Wales	Heir apparent	Son	2 April 1502; Brother died	22 April 1509; Became king	Henry VII
Margaret, Queen of Scotland	Heiress presumptive	Sister	21 April 1509; Brother became king	1 January 1511; Son born to king	Henry VIII
Henry Tudor, Duke of Cornwall	Heir apparent	Son	1 January 1511; Born	22 February 1511; Died	Henry VIII
Margaret, Queen of Scotland	Heiress presumptive	Sister	22 February 1511; Nephew died	18 February 1516; Daughter born to king	Henry VIII
Mary Tudor	Heiress presumptive	Daughter	18 February 1516; Born	23 March 1534; Declared illegitimate	Henry VIII
Elizabeth Tudor	Heiress presumptive	Daughter	23 March 1534; Half-sister declared illegitimate	8 June 1536; Declared illegitimate	Henry VIII
No recognised heir 1536–1537					Henry VIII
Edward Tudor, Prince of Wales	Heir apparent	Son	12 October 1537; Born	28 January 1547; Became king	Henry VIII
Mary Tudor	Heiress presumptive	Half-sister	28 January 1547; Half-brother became king	21 June 1553; Excluded by letters patent	Edward VI
Lady Jane Dudley	Heiress presumptive	First cousin once-removed	21 June 1553; Named in letters patent	6 July 1553; Proclaimed queen	Edward VI
Upon the death of Edward VI, the succession was disputed between his sister Mary, the heir by primogeniture and the Third Succession Act, and Lady Jane Grey, whom Edward had named his heir. Since Lady Jane's short reign is a matter of dispute, so are her heirs.
Katherine Herbert, Lady Herbert of Cardiff	Heiress presumptive	Sister	6 July 1553; Sister proclaimed queen	19 July 1553; Sister deposed	Jane (disputed)
Elizabeth Tudor	Heiress presumptive	Half-sister	6 July 1553; Half-sister became queen	17 November 1558; Became queen	Mary I
Since Elizabeth I never designated an heir, the succession was disputed among heirs of Henry VII by cognatic primogeniture and the heirs established under the will of Henry VIII. The document placed the granddaughters of the king's younger sister Mary after his children, while also disinheriting the descendants of his elder sister Margaret. However, as the will had been signed by a dry stamp rather than by the king's own hand, its legal force was questionable. The following are the leaders of both lines:					Elizabeth I
Mary, Queen of Scots	Potential heirs by cognatic primogeniture	First cousin once-removed	17 November 1558; First cousin once-removed became queen	8 February 1587; Executed	Elizabeth I
King James VI of Scotland	Potential heirs by cognatic primogeniture	First cousin twice-removed	8 February 1587; Mother executed	24 March 1603; Became king	Elizabeth I
Katherine Seymour, Countess of Hertford	Potential heirs by the will of Henry VIII	First cousin once-removed	17 November 1558; First cousin once-removed became queen	26 January 1568; Died	Elizabeth I
Lady Mary Keyes	Potential heirs by the will of Henry VIII	First cousin once-removed	26 January 1568; Sister died	20 April 1578; Died	Elizabeth I
Margaret Stanley, Dowager Countess of Derby	Potential heirs by the will of Henry VIII	First cousin once-removed	20 April 1578; First cousin died	28 September 1596; Died	Elizabeth I
Lady Anne Stanley	Potential heirs by the will of Henry VIII	First cousin three-times-removed	28 September 1596; Grandmother died	24 March 1603; Succession of new king	Elizabeth I

== 1603 to 1707: The Stuarts ==
Heir	Status	Relationship to Monarch	Became heir Reason	Ceased to be heir Reason	Next in succession Relation to heir	Monarch
Henry Frederick Stuart, Prince of Wales	Heir apparent	Son	24 March 1603; Father became king	6 November 1612; Died	Charles Stuart, Duke of York; Brother	James I
Charles Stuart, Prince of Wales	Heir apparent	Son	6 November 1612; Brother died	27 March 1625; Became king	Elizabeth, Electress Palatine; Sister	James I
Elizabeth, Electress Palatine	Heiress presumptive	Sister	27 March 1625; Brother became king	13 May 1629; Son born to king	Electoral Prince Frederick Henry of the Palatinate; 1625–1629, Son	Charles I
Elizabeth, Electress Palatine	Heiress presumptive	Sister	27 March 1625; Brother became king	13 May 1629; Son born to king	Electoral Prince Charles Louis of the Palatinate; 1629, Son	Charles I
Charles James Stuart, Duke of Cornwall	Heir apparent	Son	13 May 1629; Born	13 May 1629; Died	Elizabeth, Electress Palatine; Aunt	Charles I
Elizabeth, Electress Palatine	Heiress presumptive	Sister	13 May 1629; Nephew died	29 May 1630; Son born to king	Electoral Prince Charles Louis of the Palatinate; Son	Charles I
Charles Stuart, Prince of Wales	Heir apparent	Son	29 May 1630; Born	30 January 1649; Proclaimed king	Elizabeth, Electress Palatine; 1630–1631, Aunt	Charles I
Charles Stuart, Prince of Wales	Heir apparent	Son	29 May 1630; Born	30 January 1649; Proclaimed king	Mary Stuart; 1631–1633, Sister	Charles I
Charles Stuart, Prince of Wales	Heir apparent	Son	29 May 1630; Born	30 January 1649; Proclaimed king	James Stuart, Duke of York; 1633–1649, Brother	Charles I
James Stuart, Duke of York	Heir presumptive	Brother	30 January 1649; Brother proclaimed king	6 February 1685; Became king	Henry Stuart, Duke of Gloucester; 1649–1660, Brother	Charles II
James Stuart, Duke of York	Heir presumptive	Brother	30 January 1649; Brother proclaimed king	6 February 1685; Became king	Mary, Princess Royal and Princess of Orange; 1660, Sister	Charles II
James Stuart, Duke of York	Heir presumptive	Brother	30 January 1649; Brother proclaimed king	6 February 1685; Became king	Charles Stuart, Duke of Cambridge; 1660–1661, Son	Charles II
James Stuart, Duke of York	Heir presumptive	Brother	30 January 1649; Brother proclaimed king	6 February 1685; Became king	William III, Prince of Orange; 1661–1662, Nephew	Charles II
James Stuart, Duke of York	Heir presumptive	Brother	30 January 1649; Brother proclaimed king	6 February 1685; Became king	Mary Stuart; 1662–1663, Daughter	Charles II
James Stuart, Duke of York	Heir presumptive	Brother	30 January 1649; Brother proclaimed king	6 February 1685; Became king	James Stuart, Duke of Cambridge; 1663–1667, Son	Charles II
James Stuart, Duke of York	Heir presumptive	Brother	30 January 1649; Brother proclaimed king	6 February 1685; Became king	Mary Stuart; 1667, Daughter	Charles II
James Stuart, Duke of York	Heir presumptive	Brother	30 January 1649; Brother proclaimed king	6 February 1685; Became king	Edgar Stuart, Duke of Cambridge; 1667–1671, Son	Charles II
James Stuart, Duke of York	Heir presumptive	Brother	30 January 1649; Brother proclaimed king	6 February 1685; Became king	Mary, Princess of Orange; 1671–1677, Daughter	Charles II
James Stuart, Duke of York	Heir presumptive	Brother	30 January 1649; Brother proclaimed king	6 February 1685; Became king	Charles Stuart, Duke of Cambridge; 1677, Son	Charles II
James Stuart, Duke of York	Heir presumptive	Brother	30 January 1649; Brother proclaimed king	6 February 1685; Became king	Mary, Princess of Orange; 1677–1685, Daughter	Charles II
Mary, Princess of Orange	Heiress presumptive	Daughter	6 February 1685; Father became king	10 June 1688; Son born to king	Princess Anne of Denmark; Sister	James II
James Stuart, Prince of Wales	Heir apparent	Son	10 June 1688; Born	13 February 1689; Father deposed, excluded from succeeding	Mary, Princess of Orange; Sister	James II
Princess Anne of Denmark	Heiress presumptive	Sister (in-law / First cousin)	13 February 1689; Sister and brother-in-law became joint monarchs	8 March 1702; Became queen	None; Feb-Jul 1689	William III & Mary II
Princess Anne of Denmark	Heiress presumptive	Sister (in-law / First cousin)	13 February 1689; Sister and brother-in-law became joint monarchs	8 March 1702; Became queen	William, Duke of Gloucester; 1689–1700, Son	William III & Mary II
Princess Anne of Denmark	Heiress apparent	Sister-in-law / First cousin	13 February 1689; Sister and brother-in-law became joint monarchs	8 March 1702; Became queen	William, Duke of Gloucester; 1689–1700, Son	William III
Princess Anne of Denmark	Heiress apparent	Sister-in-law / First cousin	13 February 1689; Sister and brother-in-law became joint monarchs	8 March 1702; Became queen	None; 1700–1701	William III
Princess Anne of Denmark	Heiress apparent	Sister-in-law / First cousin	13 February 1689; Sister and brother-in-law became joint monarchs	8 March 1702; Became queen	Sophia, Dowager Electress of Hanover; 1701–1702, First cousin once-removed	William III
Sophia, Dowager Electress of Hanover	Heiress presumptive	First cousin once-removed	8 March 1702; First cousin once-removed died	1 May 1707; Formation of the Kingdom of Great Britain	George Louis, Elector of Hanover; Son	Anne

== See also ==
- List of heirs to the Scottish throne
- List of heirs to the British throne
- Succession to the British throne
- History of the English and British line of succession

== Sources ==
- Cokayne, George Edward; Gibbs, Vicary; Doubleday, Arthur (1913), The Complete Peerage, vol. III, London: St Catherine Press
- Ian Mortimer, The Fears of Henry IV: the Life of England's Self-Made King (Vintage, 2008)

== Sources ==
- Jones, M. K. (1997). "Edward IV, the Earl of Warwick and the Yorkist Claim to the Throne". Historical Research. 70 (173): 342–352. doi:10.1111/1468-2281.00048.
- Ross, C. D. (1975). Edward IV. Berkeley: University of California Press. ISBN 978-0-52002-781-7.
- Watts, J. (2004). "Richard of York, Third Duke of York (1411–1460)". Oxford Dictionary of National Biography (online ed.). Oxford University Press. doi:10.1093/ref:odnb/23503. (Subscription, Wikipedia Library access or UK public library membership required.)
