= Abbie Hern =

Welsh actress

- Born: Abbie Louise Davies; 9 February 1997 (age 29); Pontypridd, Wales
- Education: Royal Welsh College of Music & Drama
- Years active: 2019–present

Abbie Louise Hern (née Davies; born 9 February 1997) is a Welsh actress. On television, she is known for her roles in the BBC One drama The Pact (2021), the Amazon Prime series My Lady Jane (2024) and the Apple TV series Ted Lasso (2026). Her films include Enola Holmes 2 (2022).

== Early life ==
Hern was born in Pontypridd and grew up in Pontypool. Hern studied at the Royal Welsh College of Music & Drama.

== Career ==
Hern voiced the character Niamh in two Torchwood audio stories by Big Finish Productions. She made her television debut with a guest appearance in a 2020 episode of The Twilight Zone. The following year, she had her first major role in the first series of the BBC One drama The Pact as Tish. In 2022, Hern made her feature film debut as Mae in the Netflix film Enola Holmes 2. She also appeared in the sixth series of Peaky Blinders as Mary Bone.

Hern portrayed Princess Bess, based on Elizabeth I, in the Amazon Prime alternate history fantasy series My Lady Jane.

In 2026, she starred as striker Gemma Jay in season 4 of the Apple TV sports drama Ted Lasso.

== Filmography ==
=== Film ===
Year	Title	Role	Notes
2021	Through the Looking Glass	The Carer	Short film
2021	The Boy Who Stole God	Isabella	Short film
2022	Enola Holmes 2	Mae	Netflix film

=== Television ===
Year	Title	Role	Notes
2020	The Twilight Zone	Madison	Episode: "Among the Untrodden"
2021	Don Rodolfo	Margarita	Pilot
2021	The Pact	Tish	Main role; 6 episodes
2022	Peaky Blinders	Mary Bone	2 episodes (series 6)
2024	My Lady Jane	Bess	Main role; 7 episodes
2026	Ted Lasso	Gemma Jay	Main role; season 4

== Audio ==
Year	Title	Role	Notes
2018	Cardiff Unknown – October 2018	Niamh	Big Finish Productions
2019	Torchwood: Gods Among Us 3: "ScrapeJane"	Niamh	Big Finish Productions
