= List of heirs to the British throne =

This is a list of the individuals who were, at any given time, considered the next in line to succeed the British monarch to inherit the throne of the Kingdom of Great Britain (1707–1800), the United Kingdom of Great Britain and Ireland (1801–1922), or the United Kingdom of Great Britain and Northern Ireland (1922–present), should the incumbent monarch die or abdicate.

The list commences in 1707 following the Acts of Union, which joined the Kingdoms of England and Scotland (previously separate states, with separate legislatures but with the same monarch) into a single Kingdom of Great Britain. Anne became Queen of England, Scotland and Ireland on 8 March 1702 and Queen of Great Britain from 1707. The 1701 Act of Settlement established Electress Sophia of Hanover as successor to the English throne, and this was extended to Scotland through the Treaty of Union (Article II) and the Acts of Union.

== List of heirs ==
Heir	Status	Relationship to monarch	Became heir		Ceased to be heir		Duration as heir	Next in succession Relation to heir	Monarch
Heir	Status	Relationship to monarch	Date	Reason	Date	Reason	Duration as heir	Next in succession Relation to heir	Monarch
Sophia, Dowager Electress of Hanover	Heiress presumptive	First cousin, once removed	1 May 1707	Formation of Kingdom of Great Britain	8 June 1714	Died	7 years, 1 month and 27 days	George Louis, Elector of Hanover; Son	Anne
George Louis, Elector of Hanover	Heir presumptive	Second cousin	8 June 1714	Mother died	1 August 1714	Became king	1 month and 24 days	George Augustus, Duke of Cambridge; Son	Anne
George, Prince of Wales	Heir apparent	Son	1 August 1714	Father became king	11 June 1727	Became king	12 years, 10 months and 10 days	Prince Frederick, Duke of Edinburgh; Son	George I
Frederick, Prince of Wales	Heir apparent	Son	11 June 1727	Father became king	31 March 1751	Died	23 years, 9 months and 20 days	Prince William, Duke of Cumberland; 1727–1737; Brother	George II
Frederick, Prince of Wales	Heir apparent	Son	11 June 1727	Father became king	31 March 1751	Died	23 years, 9 months and 20 days	Princess Augusta; 1737–1738; Daughter	George II
Frederick, Prince of Wales	Heir apparent	Son	11 June 1727	Father became king	31 March 1751	Died	23 years, 9 months and 20 days	Prince George; 1738–1751; Son	George II
George, Prince of Wales	Heir apparent	Grandson	31 March 1751	Father died	25 October 1760	Became king	9 years, 6 months and 25 days	Prince Edward, Duke of York and Albany; Brother	George II
Prince Edward, Duke of York and Albany	Heir presumptive	Brother	25 October 1760	Brother became king	12 August 1762	Son born to king	1 year, 9 months and 18 days	Prince William Henry; Brother	George III
George, Prince of Wales	Heir apparent	Son	12 August 1762	Born	29 January 1820	Became king	57 years, 5 months and 17 days	Prince Edward, Duke of York and Albany; 1762–1763; Uncle	George III
George, Prince of Wales	Heir apparent	Son	12 August 1762	Born	29 January 1820	Became king	57 years, 5 months and 17 days	Prince Frederick, Duke of York and Albany; 1763–1796; Brother	George III
George, Prince of Wales	Heir apparent	Son	12 August 1762	Born	29 January 1820	Became king	57 years, 5 months and 17 days	Princess Charlotte of Wales; 1796–1817; Daughter	George III
George, Prince of Wales	Heir apparent	Son	12 August 1762	Born	29 January 1820	Became king	57 years, 5 months and 17 days	Prince Frederick, Duke of York and Albany; 1817–1820; Brother	George III
Prince Frederick, Duke of York and Albany	Heir presumptive	Brother	29 January 1820	Brother became king	5 January 1827	Died	6 years, 11 months and 7 days	Prince William, Duke of Clarence and St Andrews; Brother	George IV
Prince William, Duke of Clarence and St Andrews	Heir presumptive	Brother	5 January 1827	Brother died	26 June 1830	Became king	3 years, 5 months and 21 days	Princess Alexandrina Victoria of Kent; Niece	George IV
Princess Alexandrina Victoria of Kent	Heiress presumptive	Niece	26 June 1830	Uncle became king	20 June 1837	Became queen	6 years, 11 months and 25 days	Prince Ernest Augustus, Duke of Cumberland; Uncle	William IV
Ernest Augustus, King of Hanover	Heir presumptive	Uncle	20 June 1837	Niece became queen	21 November 1840	Daughter born to queen	3 years, 5 months and 1 day	George, Crown Prince of Hanover; Son	Victoria
Victoria, Princess Royal	Heiress presumptive	Daughter	21 November 1840	Born	9 November 1841	Son born to queen	11 months and 19 days	Ernest Augustus, King of Hanover; Granduncle	Victoria
Albert Edward, Prince of Wales	Heir apparent	Son	9 November 1841	Born	22 January 1901	Became king	59 years, 2 months and 13 days	Victoria, Princess Royal; 1841–1844; Sister	Victoria
Albert Edward, Prince of Wales	Heir apparent	Son	9 November 1841	Born	22 January 1901	Became king	59 years, 2 months and 13 days	Prince Alfred; 1844–1864; Brother	Victoria
Albert Edward, Prince of Wales	Heir apparent	Son	9 November 1841	Born	22 January 1901	Became king	59 years, 2 months and 13 days	Prince Albert Victor, Duke of Clarence and Avondale; 1864–1892; Son	Victoria
Albert Edward, Prince of Wales	Heir apparent	Son	9 November 1841	Born	22 January 1901	Became king	59 years, 2 months and 13 days	Prince George, Duke of York; 1892–1901; Son	Victoria
George, Prince of Wales	Heir apparent	Son	22 January 1901	Father became king	6 May 1910	Became king	9 years, 3 months and 14 days	Prince Edward of Wales; Son	Edward VII
Edward, Prince of Wales	Heir apparent	Son	6 May 1910	Father became king	20 January 1936	Became king	25 years, 8 months and 14 days	Prince Albert, Duke of York; Brother	George V
Prince Albert, Duke of York	Heir presumptive	Brother	20 January 1936	Brother became king	11 December 1936	Became king	10 months and 21 days	Princess Elizabeth of York; Daughter	Edward VIII
Princess Elizabeth, Duchess of Edinburgh	Heiress presumptive	Daughter	11 December 1936	Father became king	6 February 1952	Became queen	15 years, 1 month and 26 days	Princess Margaret; 1936–1948; Sister	George VI
Princess Elizabeth, Duchess of Edinburgh	Heiress presumptive	Daughter	11 December 1936	Father became king	6 February 1952	Became queen	15 years, 1 month and 26 days	Prince Charles of Edinburgh; 1948–1952; Son	George VI
Charles, Prince of Wales (Note: Charles, eldest son of Elizabeth II, was the longest-serving heir apparent or presumptive in British history at 70 years, 214 days.)	Heir apparent	Son	6 February 1952	Mother became queen	8 September 2022	Became king	70 years, 7 months and 2 days	Princess Anne; 1952–1960; Sister	Elizabeth II
Charles, Prince of Wales	Heir apparent	Son	6 February 1952	Mother became queen	8 September 2022	Became king	70 years, 7 months and 2 days	Prince Andrew; 1960–1982; Brother	Elizabeth II
Charles, Prince of Wales	Heir apparent	Son	6 February 1952	Mother became queen	8 September 2022	Became king	70 years, 7 months and 2 days	Prince William, Duke of Cambridge; 1982–2022; Son	Elizabeth II
William, Prince of Wales	Heir apparent	Son	8 September 2022	Father became king	Incumbent		3 years, 10 months and 30 days	Prince George of Wales; Son	Charles III

== See also ==
- Succession to the British throne
- List of heirs to the English throne
- List of heirs to the Scottish throne
- Family tree of the British royal family
