= Swim School =

Scottish indie rock band

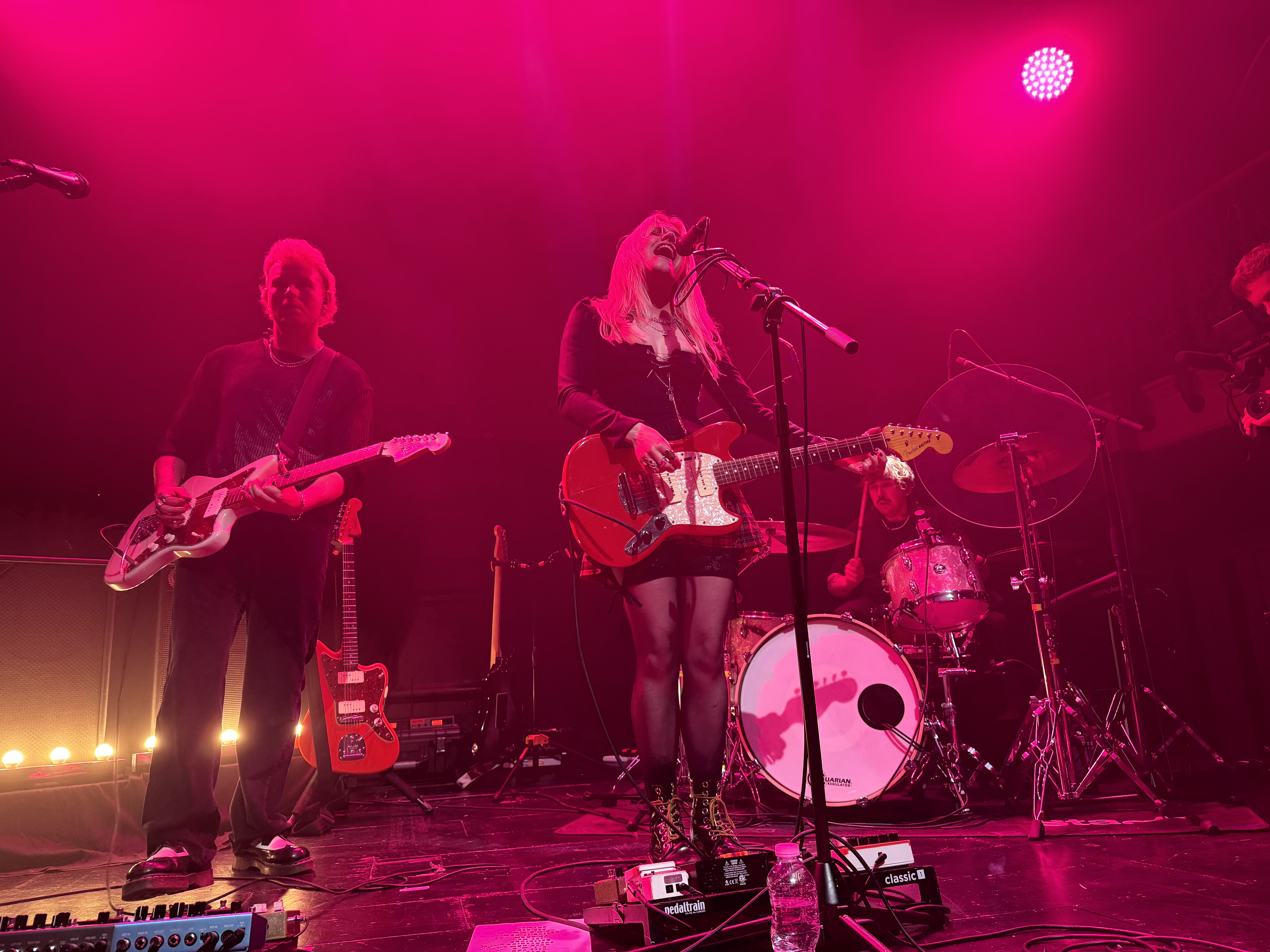
- Swim School performing in London, 2024

Background information
- Origin: Edinburgh, Scotland
- Genres: Alternative rock; indie rock; indie pop
- Years active: 2018–present
- Label: LAB Records
- Members: Alice Johnson; Lewis Bunting; Billy McMahon; Lee Brown
- Past members: Matt Mitchell; Nairn Milne

Swim School (stylised in lowercase as swim school) is a Scottish alternative rock band formed in 2018, comprising lead vocalist Alice Johnson, guitarist Lewis Bunting, drummer Billy McMahon and bassist Lee Brown.

The band has released three extended plays, a mixtape, and their self-titled debut album Swim School in October 2025. The band has supported acts including Inhaler, Biffy Clyro and Suede, and frequently cite Wolf Alice and Slowdive as influences. Swim School's work is generally categorised as alternative rock and indie rock.

== History ==
Swim School were formed in late 2018 in Edinburgh. Initially comprising Alice Johnson, Lewis Bunting, Matt Mitchell, and Nairn Milne, they released their debut single, "Sway", in February 2019. Their debut performance was in Galashiels, which took place in 1 March 2019, which was a support slot for Indigo Velvet, another Edinburgh-based band. In October 2020, Johnson stated that their set had been marred by a "40-something stranger" heckling sexist abuse at Johnson before and during the performance, prompting her to struggle to hold back tears while performing and to break down after leaving. They released their second single, "Take You There", the following June. Swim School spent around a year gigging until the COVID-19 lockdown, causing the band to break from gigs and instead concentrate on writing. Billy McMahon, former drummer of Indigo Velvet was invited to join the band in June 2020 after a period of him assisting with live streams.

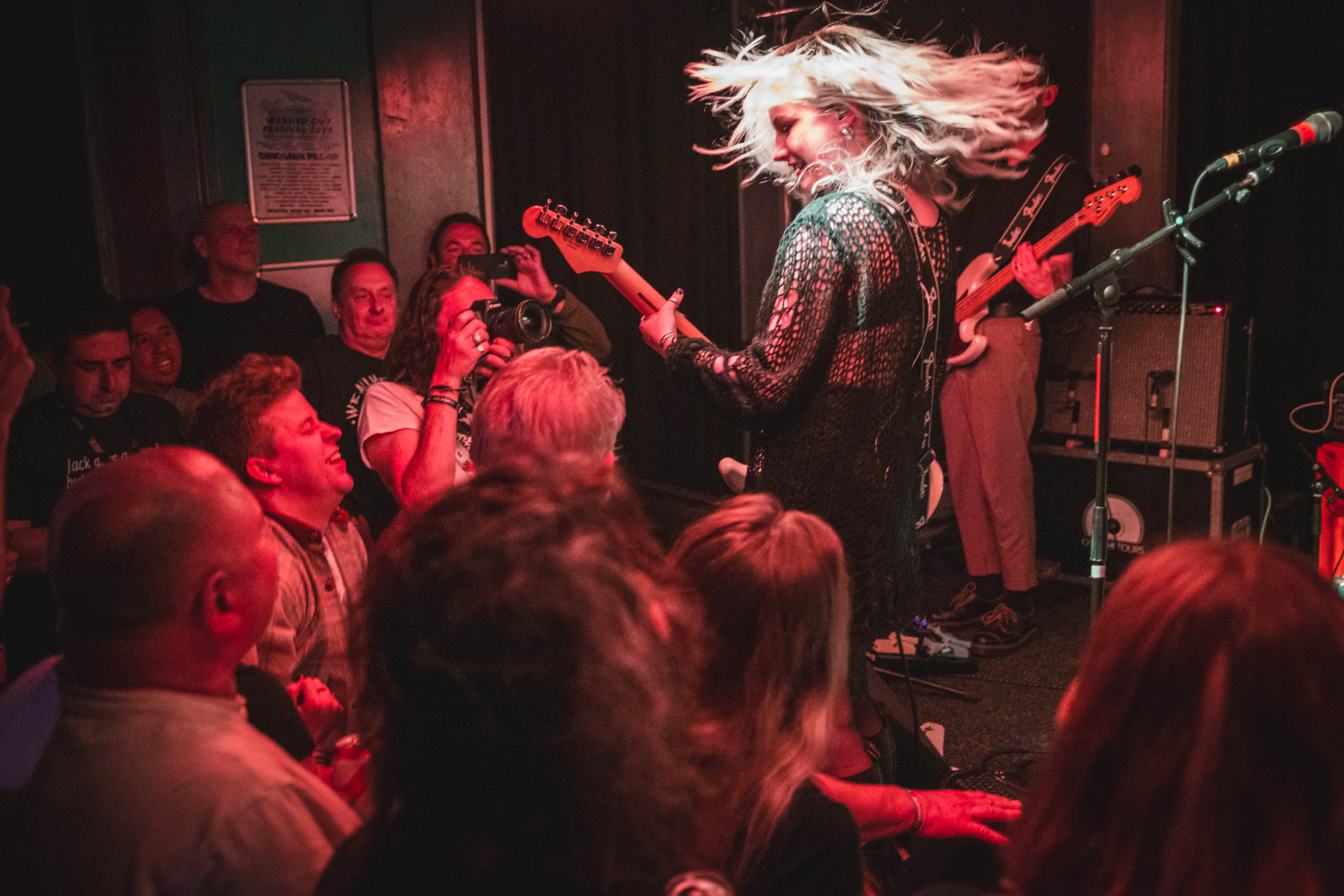
Swim School performing at the 2022 Great Escape Festival

The band released an EP, Volume 1, in 2021, and then the single "Let Me Inside Your Head" that March. By May, Milne had left the band. That month, they released the single "Outside", their first without Milne (Note: For "Outside" being released in May 2021, see.; For Milne leaving, see.) and performed a cover version of Taylor Swift's "Love Story" for a BBC live session. "Outside" was written about cutting toxic people out of their lives, while "Love Story" was added after the band decided to incorporate a cover into the set and rummaged through some Spotify playlists. The following month, they released "Anyway" and announced their second EP, Making Sense of It All, which comprised tracks about Johnson's mental state over lockdown and was released in August 2021.

After releasing Making Sense of It All, Swim School spent a period gigging. By June 2022, the band were signed to LAB Records; by that November, the band comprised Johnson, Bunting, and McMahon. That month, they released the single "Kill You", which Johnson had written the previous February about being comfortable enough in a relationship to show quirks. In February 2023, they announced their second EP Duality and released the single "Delirious". Duality, which had been recorded at Narcissus Studios in London and produced by Iain Berryman, took its title from the fact that it comprised love songs and angry songs, while Johnson wrote "Delirious" in a fit of rage after suffering from constant misogyny from sound engineers during festival season. A further single, "Don't Leave Me Behind", was released in April 2023, with Duality released in June 2023.

Two weeks after Duality was released, the band re-released that album's track "Bored", a more positive derivative of "Delirious", in an attempt to surprise their fans. "Bored" was featured on the soundtrack of EA Sports FC 24. The band supported Inhaler on their Cuts & Bruises tour in November 2023 and were featured on Dork's "Hype List 2024" the month after. In January 2024, the band released "Give Me A Reason Why", announced their "Seeing It Now" tour for April and May 2024, and released their debut mixtape, Seeing It Now. The last of these featured a cover of Pixies' "Where Is My Mind" and a new version of their earlier track "See Red", with physical copies also sporting a cover of their earlier track "Anyway". Their October 2025 album Swim School reached No. 4 in the Scottish Official Charts.

== Artistry ==
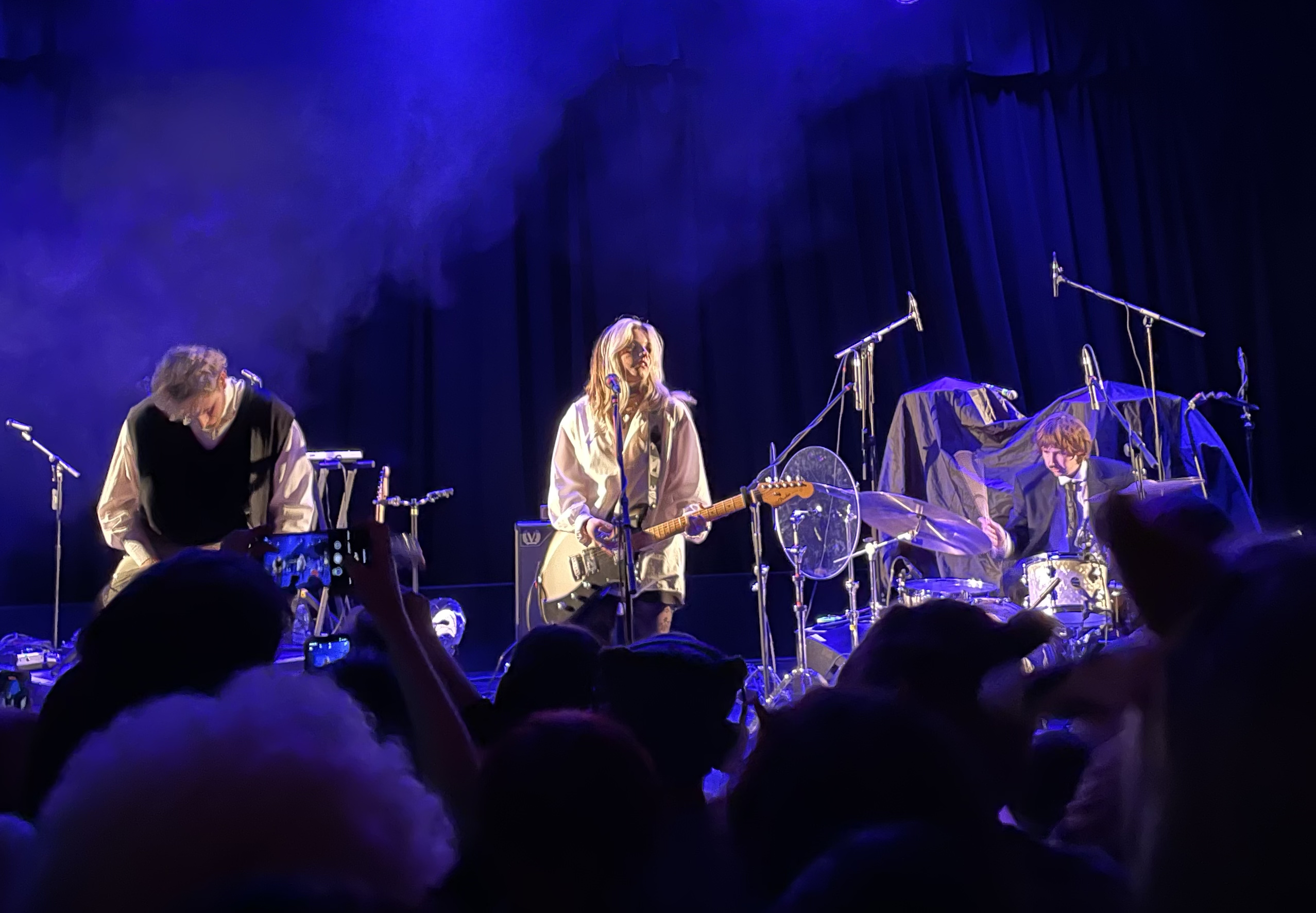
Swim School on stage in Brighton, 2023

The band have frequently cited Wolf Alice and Slowdive as influences (Note: Wolf Alice in May 2020 and Slowdive in May 2020 and January 2024.) and have described themselves as a "Tesco Value" version of the former. Johnson credits Wolf Alice lead singer Ellie Rowsell as her inspiration for being in a band and idolised Taylor Swift and Beyoncé growing up. Bunting has stated that he was a big Metallica fan in his youth and wanted to be Swim School's answer to James Hetfield and Kirk Hammett. For their cover of Swift's "Love Story", Johnson was inspired by a grungy take on Bon Iver she had seen on Triple J; Andy Von Pip of Under the Radar wrote that their rendition "turned a sweet, romantic optimistic pop song into a heavy dystopian doom rocker".

Additionally, the band have cited Jaws, Pale Waves, Palace, My Bloody Valentine, the Cure and the Smashing Pumpkins as influences for their work. Writing in July 2021, Sophie Williams of NME described the band's works as indie pop, while Johnson's vocals were described by Skiddle in January 2024 as having a "Hayley Williams-esque delivery". Finlay Holden of Dork described Making Sense of It All as a mix of indie rock, grunge, and dream pop, while Mala Mortensa of Alternative Press described "Let Me Inside Your Head"'s vibe as "expect[able] from a Halsey-fronted version of Nirvana".

== Members ==
Current

- Alice Johnson – lead vocals, guitar (2018–present)
- Lewis Bunting – guitar (2018–present)
- Billy McMahon – drums (2020–present)
- Lee Brown – bass (2025–present)

Former

- Matt Mitchell – bass (2018–2025)
- Nairn Milne – drums (2018–2021)

== Discography ==
=== Studio albums ===
Title	Details
Swim School	Released: 31 October 2025; Format: Digital download, streaming, CD, LP; Label: LAB Records

=== Mixtapes ===
Title	Details
Seeing It Now	Released: 17 April 2024; Format: Digital download, streaming, CD; Label: LAB Records

=== Extended plays ===
List of EPs, with selected details
Title	Details
Volume 1	Released: 8 January 2021; Format: Digital download, streaming
Making Sense Of It All	Released: 4 March 2022; Format: Digital download, streaming
Duality	Released: 1 June 2023; Format: Digital download, streaming; Label: LAB Records

=== Singles ===
Title	Year	Album	Video director(s)	Ref.
"Sway"	2019	Volume 1	—	
"Take You There"	2019	Volume 1	—	
"Let Me Inside Your Head"	2021	Making Sense Of It All	—	
"Outside"	2021	Making Sense Of It All	—	
"Anyway"	2021	Making Sense Of It All	—	
"Kill You"	2022	Duality	—	
"Delirious"	2023	Duality	—	
"Don't Leave Me Behind"	2023	Duality	—	
"Bored"	2023	Non-album single	Rory Barnes	
"Give Me A Reason Why"	2024	Seeing It Now	—	
"To Grow"	2024	Seeing It Now	Liam Beazley	
"Heaven"	2025	Swim School	—	
"Alone With You"	2025	Swim School	—	
"On & On"	2025	Swim School	—	

== Tours ==
=== Headlining ===
- Swim School This Is The Headline Tour (2025)
- Seeing It Now Tour (2024)

=== Supporting ===
- Lovejoy – Inselaffe Tour (2023; three shows)
- Grandson - I Love You, I'm Trying Tour (2023; seven shows)
- Inhaler – Cuts & Bruises Tour (2023; two shows)
- The Amazons - December 2023 Tour (2023; ten shows)
- The Royston Club - UK Spring Tour (2024; four shows)
- The Charlatans - Queen's Park (2024; one show)
- Pale Waves - UK Smitten Tour (2024; 11 shows)
- Suede - Dancing With The Europeans Tour (2026; 19 shows)
- Biffy Clyro - Edinburgh Summer Sessions (2026; one show)
- The Libertines - Discovery Festival, Plymouth (2027; one show)
