= The Orphan Queen =

Novel by Jodi Meadows

First edition (publ. Katherine Tegen Books) Cover artist: Colin Anderson

The Orphan Queen is an epic fantasy romance novel by Jodi Meadows. The Huffington Post ranked it as one of the top YA books of 2015. The novel's protagonist is Wilhelmina, the lost princess of Aecor, which was conquered and absorbed into the Indigo empire.
