= History of the English and British line of succession =

Since William the Conqueror claimed the English throne, succession has been determined by bequest, battle, primogeniture, and parliament.

== William I ==
On his deathbed, William the Conqueror accorded the Duchy of Normandy to his eldest son Robert Curthose, the Kingdom of England to his son William Rufus, and money for his youngest son Henry Beauclerc for him to buy land. Thus, with William I's death on 9 September 1087, the heir to the throne was William Rufus (born 1056), third son of William I.

== William II ==
William II had no children. He and his elder brother Robert previously agreed to be each other's heir. However, on his death, on 2 August 1100, Robert was away on crusade. Their younger brother, Henry Beauclerc, had the nobility elect him as king. Henry later warred with Robert and by treaty was recognised as king.

== Henry I ==
The succession to Henry I was altered by the death of his son, William Adelin. Left without male heirs, Henry took the unprecedented step of making his barons swear to accept his daughter Empress Matilda, widow of Henry V, Holy Roman Emperor, as his heir. However, her cousin, Stephen of Blois (the third son of Adela of Normandy) gained the support of the barons and usurped the throne, claiming that Henry had changed his mind on his deathbed. This act provoked a seventeen-year long civil war between him and the forces loyal to Matilda.

== Stephen ==
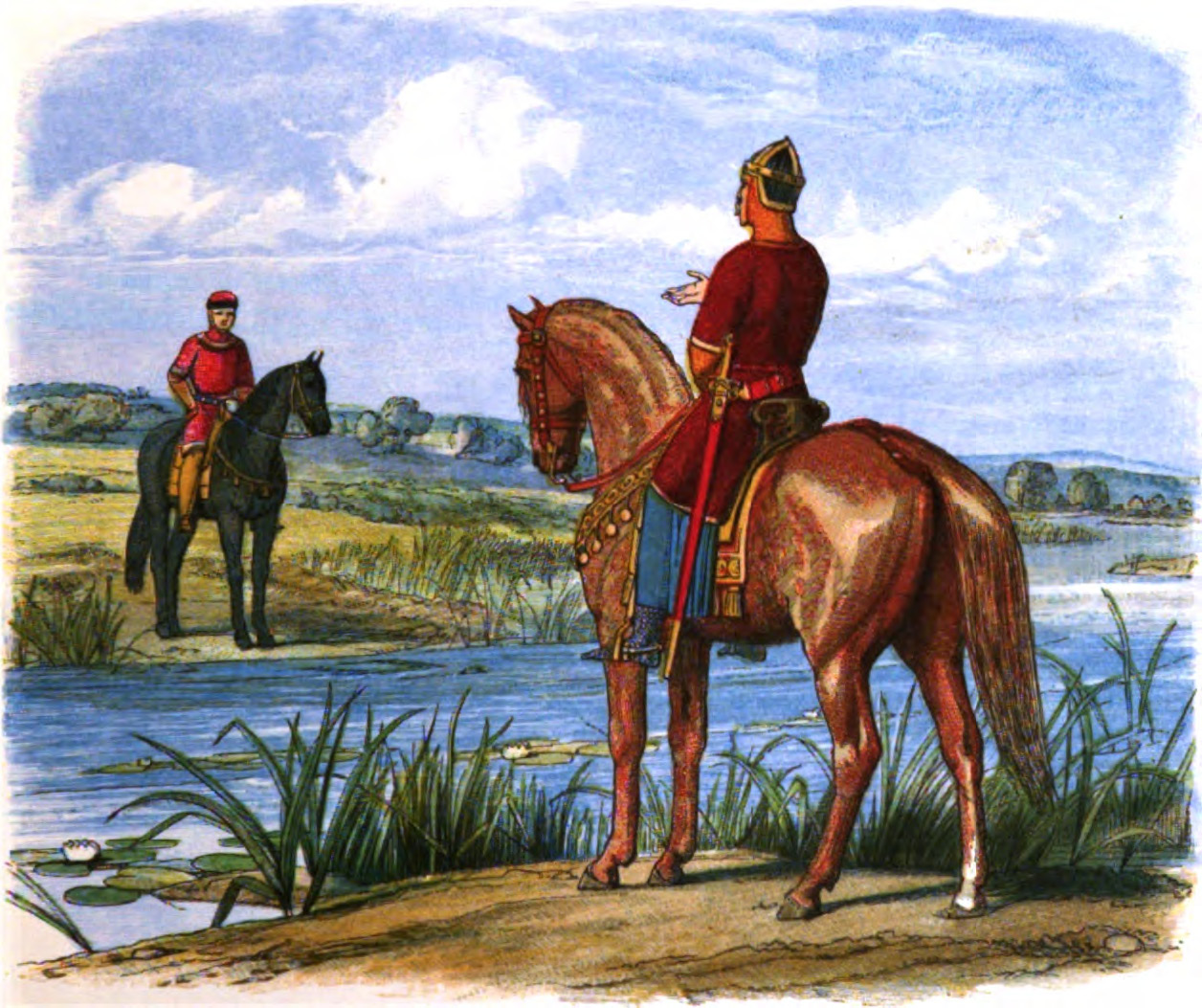
An artist's impression of the negotiation for the throne of England between Stephen of Blois and Henry of Anjou during the Anarchy which was resolved by the Treaty of Wallingford in 1153.

The succession to Stephen was altered by the death of his son Eustace, whom he wished to have crowned king during his own lifetime (in imitation of the Capetian monarchy). Though Stephen still had a son, William, the boy was still young and unprepared to challenge Matilda's son, Henry of Anjou for the throne.

Under the terms of the Treaty of Wallingford that ended the Anarchy, Stephen agreed to make Henry his successor. Thus, on the day of Stephen's death, 25 October 1154, Henry became King Henry II.

== Henry II ==
The succession to Henry II was altered by the death of his son, Henry the Young King, who was crowned king while his father still lived. Henry II had wished to divide his lands among his children upon his death, but was forced to sign the unfavorable treaty of Azay-le-Rideau on 4 July 1189 (two days before his death) with the king of France and his rebellious sons, by which he recognised his eldest son Richard as sole heir.

On the day of Henry II's death, 6 July 1189, the throne passed to his eldest living son: Richard I.

== Richard I ==
Richard had no legitimate children. On the day of his death, 6 April 1199, if the line of succession to the English throne had followed primogeniture, he would have been succeeded by his nephew Arthur I, Duke of Brittany (born 1187), son of Richard I's brother Geoffrey II, Duke of Brittany. However, since Arthur had sided with Philip II of France, Richard's enemy, Richard named his younger brother John as his heir, and he became king.

== John ==
John died, on 19 October 1216, in the midst of conflict against his barons; most of them had already recognised Prince Louis of France as king. However, with John's death, his barons saw his young son as a safer option. John's eldest son became Henry III, and the French were driven away from the country.

== Henry III ==
On Henry III's death, on 16 November 1272, the throne passed to his eldest son, Edward I.

== Edward I ==
On Edward I's death, on 7 July 1307, the throne passed to his eldest surviving son, Edward II.

== Edward II ==
On the day of Edward II's abdication, 25 January 1327, the throne passed to his eldest son, Edward III.

== Edward III ==
The succession to Edward III was governed according to his entail to the crown in 1376. On his death, on 21 June 1377, the line of succession to the English throne was:

1. Richard of Bordeaux, Prince of Wales (born 1367), younger son of Edward the Black Prince, Edward III's deceased eldest son (born 1330)
2. John of Gaunt, Duke of Lancaster (born 1340), fourth son of Edward III
3. Henry Bolingbroke (born 1367), fourth son of the Duke of Lancaster
4. Edmund of Langley, Earl of Cambridge (born 1341), fifth son of Edward III
5. Edward of Norwich (born 1373), only son of the Earl of Cambridge
6. Thomas of Woodstock, Earl of Essex (born 1355), seventh son of Edward III

The throne passed to the first person in line, who became Richard II.

== Richard II ==
After the death of Richard's uncle, John of Gaunt, in 1399, the two main contenders to be Richard II's heir were:

- Edmund Mortimer, Earl of March (born 1391), elder son of Roger Mortimer, 4th Earl of March, deceased elder son of Philippa, 5th Countess of Ulster, deceased only daughter of Lionel of Antwerp, Duke of Clarence, Edward III's deceased third son
- Henry Bolingbroke, Duke of Lancaster (born 1367), fourth son of John of Gaunt, Duke of Lancaster, Edward III's deceased fourth son.

Richard disinherited Henry, who was in exile, but Richard was deposed and Bolingbroke became king as Henry IV.

== Henry IV ==
Henry had justified his usurpation by emphasising his descent in the male line. On the day of Henry IV's death, 20 March 1413, the line of succession to the English throne following agnatic primogeniture was:

1. Henry of Monmouth, Prince of Wales (born 1386), eldest son of Henry IV
2. Thomas of Lancaster, Duke of Clarence (born 1387), second son of Henry IV
3. John of Lancaster (born 1389), third son of Henry IV
4. Humphrey of Lancaster (born 1390), fourth son of Henry IV
5. Edward of Norwich, Duke of York (born 1373), elder son of Edmund of Langley, 1st Duke of York, Edward III's deceased fifth son
6. Richard of Conisburgh, Earl of Cambridge (born 1385), younger son of Edmund of Langley, 1st Duke of York
7. Richard of York (born 1411), only surviving son of the Earl of Cambridge

Upon his death, the throne passed to the first person in line, who became Henry V.

== Henry V ==
On the day of Henry V's death, 31 August 1422, the line of succession following agnatic primogeniture was:

1. Henry, Duke of Cornwall (born 1421), only son of Henry V
2. John of Lancaster, Duke of Bedford (born 1389), third son of Henry IV
3. Humphrey of Lancaster, Duke of Gloucester (born 1390), fourth son of Henry IV
4. Richard of York, Duke of York (born 1411), younger son of Richard of Conisburgh, 3rd Earl of Cambridge, deceased younger son of Edmund of Langley, 1st Duke of York, Edward III's deceased fifth son

Upon his death, the throne passed to the first person in line, who became Henry VI.

== Henry VI (first instance) ==
On the day of Henry VI's first deposition, 4 March 1461, the line of succession following agnatic primogeniture was;

1. Edward of Westminster, Prince of Wales (born 1453), only son of Henry VI
2. Edward Plantagenet, Duke of York (born 1442), second son of Richard of York, 3rd Duke of York, deceased younger son of Richard of Conisburgh, 3rd Earl of Cambridge, deceased younger son of Edmund of Langley, 1st Duke of York, Edward III's deceased fifth son
3. George Plantagenet (born 1449), sixth son of Richard of York, 3rd Duke of York
4. Richard Plantagenet (born 1452), eighth son of Richard of York, 3rd Duke of York

However, during the Wars of the Roses, Henry VI was forcibly deposed by his third cousin, Edward, Duke of York, who became Edward IV.

== Edward IV (first instance) ==
After George Plantagenet, Duke of Clarence (born 1449), was proclaimed a traitor on 31 March 1470, Edward IV never formally named a new heir as his queen Elizabeth Woodville was pregnant at the time, and he was hoping (correctly) that the child would be a boy. On 3 October 1470 however, Edward IV was deposed and the throne was restored to Henry VI, the previous monarch, during the period known as the Readeption of Henry VI.

== Henry VI (second instance) ==
On the day of Henry VI's second deposition, 11 April 1471, the line of succession following agnatic primogeniture was:

1. Edward of Westminster, Prince of Wales (born 1453), only son of Henry VI
  - Edward Plantagenet (born 1442), second son of Richard of York, 3rd Duke of York, deceased younger son of Richard of Conisburgh, 3rd Earl of Cambridge, deceased younger son of Edmund of Langley, 1st Duke of York, Edward III's deceased fifth son. Edward was debarred from the succession due to his attainder.
  - Edward Plantagenet (born 1470), only son of Edward Plantagenet. Edward was also debarred from the succession due to his father's attainder.
2. George Plantagenet, Duke of Clarence (born 1449), sixth son of Richard of York, 3rd Duke of York, he had rejoined his brother's forces against Henry.
  - Richard Plantagenet (born 1452), eighth son of Richard of York, 3rd Duke of York. Richard was debarred from the succession due to his attainder.

Henry was defeated in the Battle of Barnet and deposed. He died in the Tower of London on 21 May 1471, seventeen days after the final Yorkist victory in the Battle of Tewkesbury.

== Edward IV (second instance) ==
On the day of Edward IV's death, 9 April 1483, he had two living sons:

1. Edward Plantagenet, Prince of Wales (born 1470)
2. Richard of Shrewsbury, Duke of York (born 1473)

Upon his death, the throne passed to the elder son, who became Edward V.

== Edward V ==
On the day of Edward V's deposition, 25 June 1483, his younger brother, Richard of Shrewsbury, Duke of York, (born 1473) was the heir presumptive to throne. The King and his brother however were declared illegitimate and the throne was claimed by their uncle, Richard Plantagenet, Duke of Gloucester.

== Richard III ==
Following the death of Edward of Middleham, Prince of Wales on 9 April 1484, Richard III never formally named a new heir. On 22 August 1485, Richard III was killed at the Battle of Bosworth Field, and was succeeded by the victor of the battle, Henry Tudor, 2nd Earl of Richmond, a descendant in a legitimated line of John of Gaunt. He became Henry VII. He also buffered his claim by marrying Elizabeth of York, daughter of Edward IV, his heir by male-preference primogeniture upon the deaths of her brothers.

== Henry VII ==
On the day of Henry VII's death, 21 April 1509, the throne passed to his only living son, Henry VIII.

== Henry VIII ==
On the day of Henry VIII's death, 28 January 1547, the line of succession was governed by the Third Succession Act:

1. Edward, Prince of Wales (born 1537), younger son of Henry VIII
2. Lady Mary (born 1516), elder daughter of Henry VIII
3. Lady Elizabeth (born 1533), younger daughter of Henry VIII
Descendants of Henry VII's eldest daughter Margaret Tudor, Queen of Scotland who would have been next in line were excluded by Henry's will:
- Mary, Queen of Scots (born 1542), only daughter of James V of Scotland, deceased third son of Margaret
- Margaret Stewart, Countess of Lennox (born 1515), only daughter of Margaret by Archibald Douglas, 6th Earl of Angus
- Henry Stuart, Lord Darnley (born 1545), only surviving son of the Countess of Lennox
Also excluded by Henry's will were the daughters of Henry VII's third daughter Mary Tudor, Queen of France (Frances Grey and Eleanor Clifford), but not the granddaughters:
- Frances Grey, Marchioness of Dorset, elder daughter of Mary
4. Lady Jane Grey (born 1536/7), eldest daughter of the Marchioness of Dorset (later briefly queen regnant)
5. Lady Katherine Grey (born 1540), second daughter of the Marchioness of Dorset
6. Lady Mary Grey (born 1545), third daughter of the Marchioness of Dorset
- Eleanor Clifford, Countess of Cumberland (born 1519), younger daughter of Mary
7. Lady Margaret Clifford (born 1540), only daughter of the Countess of Cumberland

Upon Henry's death, the throne passed to Henry's son, who became Edward VI.

== Edward VI ==
On the day of Edward VI's death, 6 July 1553, the line of succession to the English throne was as follows according to the will of Henry VIII, which excluded the descendants of his elder sister, Margaret, Queen of Scotland (note: Henry VIII's will was signed with a dry stamp rather than his hand, a technicality that eventually allowed the Stuarts to succeed):

1. Lady Mary (born 1516), elder daughter of Henry VIII
2. Lady Elizabeth (born 1533), younger daughter of Henry VIII
3. Lady Jane Dudley (born 1536/7), eldest daughter of Frances Grey, Duchess of Suffolk, elder daughter of Mary Tudor, Queen of France, Henry VII's deceased third daughter
4. Katherine, Lady Herbert of Cardiff (born 1540), second daughter of the Duchess of Suffolk
5. Lady Mary Grey (born 1545), third daughter of the Duchess of Suffolk
6. Lady Margaret Clifford (born 1540), only daughter of Eleanor Clifford, Countess of Cumberland, deceased younger daughter of Mary Tudor, Queen of France

Edward VI left a Device for the Succession, in an attempt to remove the peculiarity of his sisters' illegitimacy and rights of succession. The validity of the device was challenged after his death. In Edward's Device,

Henry VIII's two illegitimate (by the Third Succession Act) daughters were excluded:
- Lady Mary (born 1516), elder daughter of Henry VIII
- Lady Elizabeth (born 1533), younger daughter of Henry VIII
Descendants of Henry VII's eldest daughter Margaret Tudor, Queen of Scotland were excluded by Henry's will:
- Mary, Queen of Scots (born 1542), only daughter of James V of Scotland, deceased third son of Margaret
- Margaret Stewart, Countess of Lennox (born 1515), only daughter of Margaret by Archibald Douglas, 6th Earl of Angus
- Henry Stuart, Lord Darnley (born 1545), only surviving son of the Countess of Lennox
Following his father's will, Edward left out his cousin, Frances Grey
- Frances Grey, Duchess of Suffolk (born 1517), elder daughter of Mary Tudor, Queen of France, Henry VII's deceased third daughter

1. Lady Jane Dudley (born 1536/7), eldest daughter of the Duchess of Suffolk
2. Katherine, Lady Herbert of Cardiff (born 1540), second daughter of the Duchess of Suffolk
3. Lady Mary Grey (born 1545), third daughter of the Duchess of Suffolk
4. Lady Margaret Clifford (born 1540), only daughter of Eleanor Clifford, Countess of Cumberland, deceased younger daughter of Mary

Upon his death, the first person in line per Edward's Device was proclaimed Queen Jane. Within days, Lady Mary claimed the throne as Mary I.

== Mary I ==
On the day of Mary I's death, 17 November 1558, the line of succession to the English throne was as follows according to the will of Henry VIII:

1. Lady Elizabeth (born 1533), younger daughter of Henry VIII
2. Katherine, Lady Herbert of Cardiff (born 1540), second daughter of Frances Grey, Duchess of Suffolk, elder daughter of Mary Tudor, Queen of France, Henry VII's deceased third daughter
3. Lady Mary Grey (born 1545), third daughter of Frances Grey, Duchess of Suffolk
4. Lady Margaret Clifford (born 1540), only daughter of Eleanor Clifford, Countess of Cumberland, deceased younger daughter of Mary Tudor, Queen of France

Upon her death, the throne passed to the first person in the succession, who became Elizabeth I.

== Elizabeth I ==
During her reign, Elizabeth I never named a successor. On the day of Elizabeth's death, 24 March 1603, Elizabeth's potential heirs were from the lines of her father's two sisters:

Descendants of Henry VII's eldest daughter, Margaret Tudor, Queen of Scotland, were excluded by Henry's will:
- James VI of Scotland (born 1566), only son of Mary, Queen of Scots, deceased only daughter of James V of Scotland, deceased third son of Margaret
- Prince Henry Frederick, Duke of Rothesay (born 1594), elder son of the King of Scotland
- Prince Charles, Duke of Albany (born 1600), younger son of the King of Scotland
- Princess Elizabeth (born 1596), only daughter of the King of Scotland
- Lady Arbella Stuart (born 1575), only daughter of Charles Stuart, 5th Earl of Lennox, deceased younger surviving son of Margaret Stewart, Countess of Lennox, deceased only daughter of Margaret

Descendants of Henry VII's third daughter, Mary Tudor, Queen of France, were junior in terms of primogeniture, but were placed as heirs after Henry VIII's own descendants. Descendants through Lady Katherine Grey, Mary's granddaughter, who were not considered legitimate at the time:
- Edward Seymour, Lord Beauchamp (born 1561), elder son of Katherine Seymour, Countess of Hertford, deceased second daughter of Frances Grey, Duchess of Suffolk, deceased elder daughter of Mary
- The Hon Edward Seymour (born 1586), eldest son of Lord Beauchamp
- The Hon William Seymour (born 1588), second son of Lord Beauchamp
- The Hon Francis Seymour (born c. 1590), third son of Lord Beauchamp
- The Hon Honora Seymour (born 1594), first daughter of Lord Beauchamp
- The Hon Anne Seymour, second daughter of Lord Beauchamp
- The Hon Mary Seymour, third daughter of Lord Beauchamp

The only legitimate heirs according to Henry VIII's will were the descendants of Margaret Stanley, Countess of Derby, deceased only daughter of Eleanor Clifford, Countess of Cumberland, deceased younger daughter of Mary:

1. Lady Anne Stanley (born 1580), eldest daughter of Ferdinando Stanley, 5th Earl of Derby, deceased second son of Margaret Stanley, Countess of Derby
2. Lady Frances Egerton (born 1583), second daughter of Ferdinando Stanley, 5th Earl of Derby
3. Lady Elizabeth Hastings (born 1587), third daughter of Ferdinando Stanley, 5th Earl of Derby
4. William Stanley, 6th Earl of Derby (born 1561), third son of Margaret Stanley, Countess of Derby

Upon Elizabeth's death, despite Henry VIII's will, the throne passed to King James VI of Scotland, who became James I of England.

== James I ==
On the day of James I's death, 27 March 1625, the line of succession to the English throne was:

1. Charles, Prince of Wales (born 1600), second son of James I
2. Elizabeth, Queen of Bohemia (born 1596), eldest daughter of James I
3. Prince Frederick Henry of the Palatinate (born 1614), eldest son of Elizabeth
4. Prince Charles Louis of the Palatinate (born 1617), second son of Elizabeth
5. Prince Rupert of the Palatinate (born 1619), third son of Elizabeth
6. Prince Maurice of the Palatinate (born 1620), fourth son of Elizabeth
7. Princess Elisabeth of the Palatinate (born 1618), elder daughter of Elizabeth
8. Princess Louise of the Palatinate (born 1622), younger daughter of Elizabeth
9. William Seymour, Earl of Hertford (born 1588) second son of Edward Seymour, Lord Beauchamp, deceased elder son of Lady Katherine Grey, deceased second daughter of Frances Grey, Duchess of Suffolk, deceased elder daughter of Mary Tudor, Queen of France, deceased third daughter of Henry VII
10. William Seymour (born 1621), eldest son of the Earl of Hertford

Upon his death, the throne passed to the first person in line, who became Charles I.

== Charles I ==
When Charles I was beheaded on 30 January 1649 the line of succession to the English and Scottish thrones was:

1. Charles, Prince of Wales (born 1630), second son of Charles I
2. Prince James, Duke of York (born 1633), third son of Charles I
3. Prince Henry (born 1639), fourth son of Charles I
4. Mary, Princess Royal and Princess of Orange (born 1631) eldest daughter of Charles I
5. Princess Elizabeth (born 1635), second daughter of Charles I
6. Princess Henrietta Anne (born 1644), fifth daughter of Charles I
7. Elizabeth, Queen of Bohemia (born 1596), eldest daughter of James I
8. Charles I Louis, Elector Palatine (born 1617), second son of Elizabeth
9. Prince Rupert of the Rhine (born 1619), third son of Elizabeth
10. Prince Maurice von Simmern (born 1620), fourth son of Elizabeth

However, the monarchy in England was abolished and Oliver Cromwell became Lord Protector. After Cromwell's death, the monarchy was restored in 1660 under Charles I's eldest son, Charles II.

== Charles II ==
On the day of Charles II death, 6 February 1685, the line of succession to the English and Scottish thrones was:

1. Prince James, Duke of York and Albany (born 1633), second son of Charles I
2. Mary, Princess of Orange (born 1662), eldest daughter of the Duke of York and Albany
3. Princess Anne of Denmark and Norway (born 1665), second daughter of the Duke of York and Albany
4. William III, Prince of Orange (born 1650), only son of Mary, Princess Royal and Princess of Orange, Charles I's deceased eldest daughter
5. Maria Luisa, Queen of Spain (born 1662), elder daughter of Henrietta Stuart, Duchess of Orléans, Charles I's deceased fifth daughter
6. Anne Marie, Duchess of Savoy (born 1669), younger daughter of Henrietta
7. Charles II, Elector Palatine (born 1651), elder son of Charles I Louis, Elector Palatine, deceased second son of Elizabeth Stuart, Queen of Bohemia, James I's deceased eldest daughter
8. Elisabeth Charlotte, Duchess of Orléans (born 1652), only daughter of Charles I Louis, Elector Palatine
9. Philippe, Duke of Chartres (born 1674), younger son of the Duchess of Orléans
10. Princess Elisabeth Charlotte of Orleans (born 1676), only daughter of the Duchess of Orléans

On his death, the throne passed to the first in line, who became James II.

== James II ==
On the day that James II fled the country, 23 December 1688, the line of succession to the English and Scottish thrones was:

1. James, Prince of Wales (born 1688), sixth son of James II
2. Mary, Princess of Orange (born 1662), eldest daughter of James II
3. Princess Anne of Denmark and Norway (born 1665), second daughter of James II
4. William III, Prince of Orange (born 1650), only son of Mary, Princess Royal and Princess of Orange, Charles I's deceased eldest daughter
5. Maria Luisa, Queen of Spain (born 1662), elder daughter of Henrietta Stuart, Duchess of Orléans, Charles I's deceased fifth daughter
6. Anne Marie, Duchess of Savoy (born 1669), younger daughter of Henrietta
7. Princess Marie-Adélaïde of Savoy (born 1685), eldest daughter of the Duchess of Savoy
8. Princess Marie Anne of Orléans (born 1687), second daughter of the Duchess of Savoy
9. Princess Maria Luisa of Savoy (born 1688), third daughter of the Duchess of Savoy
10. Elisabeth Charlotte, Duchess of Orléans (born 1652), only daughter of Charles I Louis, Elector Palatine, deceased second son of Elizabeth Stuart, Queen of Bohemia, James I's deceased eldest daughter

Parliament offered the throne jointly to James II's elder daughter, who became Mary II, and her husband and first cousin, William III.

== William III & Mary II ==
The Bill of Rights 1689 established that, whichever of the joint monarchs, William III and Mary II, died first, the other would reign alone. As Mary II died first, on 28 December 1694, William III became sole remaining monarch. On the day of Mary's death, the line of succession to the English and Scottish thrones was:

1. Princess Anne of Denmark (born 1665), second daughter of James II
2. Prince William of Denmark, Duke of Gloucester (born 1689), only surviving child of Anne

== William III ==
On the day of William III's death, 8 March 1702, the line of succession to the English throne was determined by the Act of Settlement 1701:

1. Princess Anne of Denmark (born 1665), sister of the king's late wife and daughter of James II
2. Sophia, Electress of Hanover (born 1630), fourth daughter of Elizabeth Stuart, Queen of Bohemia, James I's deceased eldest daughter
3. George Louis, Elector of Hanover (born 1660), eldest son of Electress Sophia
4. George Augustus, Electoral Prince of Hanover (born 1683), only son of the Elector of Hanover
5. Princess Sophia Dorothea of Hanover (born 1687), only daughter of the Elector of Hanover
  - Prince Maximilian William of Hanover (born 1666), third son of Electress Sophia, was excluded from the succession by the Bill of Rights 1689 for being a Roman Catholic.
6. Prince Christian Henry of Hanover (born 1671), fifth son of Electress Sophia
7. Prince Ernest Augustus of Hanover (born 1674), sixth son of Electress Sophia
8. Sophia Charlotte, Queen in Prussia (born 1668), only daughter of Electress Sophia
9. Frederick William, Crown Prince of Prussia (born 1688), younger son of Queen Sophia Charlotte

The line of succession to the Scottish throne was governed by the Claim of Right Act 1689:

1. Princess Anne of Denmark (born 1665), sister of the king's late wife

Upon his death, the throne passed to the first person in line, who became Queen Anne.

The succession continued with the monarchs of Great Britain.

== Anne ==
On the day of Anne's death, 1 August 1714, the line of succession to the British throne was determined by the Act of Settlement 1701:

1. George Louis, Elector of Hanover (born 1660), eldest son of Sophia, Electress of Hanover, who died less than two months earlier, fourth daughter of Elizabeth Stuart, Queen of Bohemia, James I's deceased eldest daughter
2. George Augustus, Electoral Prince of Hanover (born 1683), only son of the Elector of Hanover
3. Prince Frederick of Hanover (born 1707), only son of the Electoral Prince of Hanover
4. Princess Anne of Hanover (born 1709), eldest daughter of the Electoral Prince of Hanover
5. Princess Amelia of Hanover (born 1711), second daughter of the Electoral Prince of Hanover
6. Princess Caroline of Hanover (born 1713), third daughter of the Electoral Prince of Hanover
7. Sophia Dorothea, Queen in Prussia (born 1687), only daughter of the Elector of Hanover
8. Frederick, Crown Prince of Prussia (born 1712), third son of Queen Sophia Dorothea
9. Princess Wilhelmine of Prussia (born 1709), elder daughter of Queen Sophia Dorothea
  - Prince Maximilian William of Hanover (born 1666), third son of Electress Sophia, was excluded from the succession by the Bill of Rights 1689 for being a Roman Catholic.
10. Prince Ernest Augustus of Hanover (born 1674), sixth son of Electress Sophia

Upon her death, the throne passed to the first person in line, who became George I.

== George I ==
On the day of George I's death, 11 June 1727, the line of succession to the British throne was:

1. George, Prince of Wales (born 1683), only son of George I
2. Prince Frederick, Duke of Edinburgh (born 1707), eldest son of the Prince of Wales
3. Prince William, Duke of Cumberland (born 1721), third son of the Prince of Wales
4. Princess Anne (born 1709), eldest daughter of the Prince of Wales
5. Princess Amelia (born 1711), second daughter of the Prince of Wales
6. Princess Caroline (born 1713), third daughter of the Prince of Wales
7. Princess Mary (born 1723), fourth daughter of the Prince of Wales
8. Princess Louise (born 1724), fifth daughter of the Prince of Wales
9. Sophia Dorothea, Queen in Prussia (born 1687), only daughter of George I
10. Frederick, Crown Prince of Prussia (born 1712), third son of Queen Sophia Dorothea

Upon his death, the throne passed to the first person in line, who became George II.

== George II ==
On the day of George II's death, 25 October 1760, the line of succession to the British throne was:

1. George, Prince of Wales (born 1738), eldest son of Frederick, Prince of Wales, George II's deceased eldest son
2. Prince Edward, Duke of York and Albany (born 1739), second son of Frederick, Prince of Wales
3. Prince William Henry (born 1743), third son of Frederick, Prince of Wales
4. Prince Henry (born 1745), fourth son of Frederick, Prince of Wales
5. Prince Frederick (born 1750), fifth son of Frederick, Prince of Wales
6. Princess Augusta (born 1737), eldest daughter of Frederick, Prince of Wales
7. Princess Louisa (born 1749), third daughter of Frederick, Prince of Wales
8. Princess Caroline Matilda (born 1751), fourth daughter of Frederick, Prince of Wales
9. Prince William, Duke of Cumberland (born 1721), third son of George II
10. William V, Prince of Orange (born 1748), only son of Anne, Princess Royal and Princess of Orange, George II's deceased eldest daughter

Upon his death, the throne passed to the first person in line, who became George III.

== George III ==
On the day of George III's death, 29 January 1820, the line of succession to the British throne was:

1. George, Prince Regent, Prince of Wales (born 1762), eldest son of George III
2. Prince Frederick, Duke of York and Albany (born 1763), second son of George III
3. Prince William, Duke of Clarence and St Andrews (born 1765), third son of George III
4. Princess Alexandrina Victoria of Kent (born 1819), only child of Prince Edward, Duke of Kent and Strathearn, George III's fourth son who died six days earlier
5. Prince Ernest Augustus, Duke of Cumberland and Teviotdale (born 1771), fifth son of George III
6. Prince George of Cumberland (born 1819), only child of the Duke of Cumberland and Teviotdale
7. Prince Augustus Frederick, Duke of Sussex (born 1773), sixth son of George III
8. Prince Adolphus, Duke of Cambridge (born 1774), seventh son of George III
9. Prince George of Cambridge (born 1819), only child of the Duke of Cambridge
10. Charlotte, Princess Royal and Queen Dowager of Württemberg (born 1766), eldest daughter of George III

Upon his death, the throne passed to the first person in line, who became George IV.

== George IV ==
On the day of George IV's death, 26 June 1830, the line of succession to the British throne was:

1. Prince William, Duke of Clarence and St Andrews (born 1765), third son of George III
2. Princess Alexandrina Victoria of Kent (born 1819), only child of Prince Edward, Duke of Kent and Strathearn, George III's deceased fourth son
3. Prince Ernest Augustus, Duke of Cumberland and Teviotdale (born 1771), fifth son of George III
4. Prince George of Cumberland (born 1819), only child of the Duke of Cumberland and Teviotdale
5. Prince Augustus Frederick, Duke of Sussex (born 1773), sixth son of George III
6. Prince Adolphus, Duke of Cambridge (born 1774), seventh son of George III
7. Prince George of Cambridge (born 1819), only son of the Duke of Cambridge
8. Princess Augusta of Cambridge (born 1822), only daughter of the Duke of Cambridge
9. Princess Augusta Sophia (born 1768), second daughter of George III
10. Princess Elizabeth, Dowager Landgravine of Hesse-Homburg (born 1770), third daughter of George III

Upon his death, the throne passed to the first person in line, who became William IV.

== William IV ==
On the day of William IV's death, 20 June 1837, the line of succession to the British throne was:

1. Princess Alexandrina Victoria of Kent (born 1819), only child of Prince Edward, Duke of Kent and Strathearn, George III's deceased fourth son
2. Prince Ernest Augustus, Duke of Cumberland and Teviotdale (born 1771), fifth son of George III
3. Prince George of Cumberland (born 1819), only child of the Duke of Cumberland and Teviotdale
4. Prince Augustus Frederick, Duke of Sussex (born 1773), sixth son of George III
5. Prince Adolphus, Duke of Cambridge (born 1774), seventh son of George III
6. Prince George of Cambridge (born 1819), only son of the Duke of Cambridge
7. Princess Augusta of Cambridge (born 1822), elder daughter of the Duke of Cambridge
8. Princess Mary Adelaide of Cambridge (born 1833), younger daughter of the Duke of Cambridge
9. Princess Augusta Sophia (born 1768), second daughter of George III
10. Princess Elizabeth, Dowager Landgravine of Hesse-Homburg (born 1770), third daughter of George III

Upon his death, the throne passed to the first person in line, who became Queen Victoria.

== Victoria ==
On the day of Victoria's death, 22 January 1901, the line of succession to the British throne was:

1. Albert Edward, Prince of Wales (born 1841), eldest son of Victoria
2. Prince George, Duke of York (born 1865), only surviving son of the Prince of Wales
3. Prince Edward of York (born 1894), eldest son of the Duke of York
4. Prince Albert of York (born 1895), second son of the Duke of York
5. Prince Henry of York (born 1900), third son of the Duke of York
6. Princess Mary of York (born 1897), only daughter of the Duke of York
7. Princess Louise, Duchess of Fife (born 1867), eldest daughter of the Prince of Wales
8. Lady Alexandra Duff (born 1891), elder daughter of Princess Louise
9. Lady Maud Duff (born 1893), younger daughter of Princess Louise
10. Princess Victoria of Wales (born 1868), second daughter of the Prince of Wales

Upon her death, the throne passed to the first person in line, who became Edward VII.

== Edward VII ==
On the day of Edward VII's death, 6 May 1910, the line of succession to the British throne was:

1. George, Prince of Wales (born 1865), only surviving son of Edward VII
2. Prince Edward of Wales (born 1894), eldest son of the Prince of Wales
3. Prince Albert of Wales (born 1895), second son of the Prince of Wales
4. Prince Henry of Wales (born 1900), third son of the Prince of Wales
5. Prince George of Wales (born 1902), fourth son of the Prince of Wales
6. Prince John of Wales (born 1905), fifth son of the Prince of Wales
7. Princess Mary of Wales (born 1897), only daughter of the Prince of Wales
8. Louise, Princess Royal (born 1867), eldest daughter of Edward VII
9. Princess Alexandra (born 1891), elder daughter of the Princess Royal
10. Princess Maud (born 1893), younger daughter of the Princess Royal

Upon his death, the throne passed to the first person in line, who became George V.

== George V ==
On the day of George V's death, 20 January 1936, the line of succession to the British throne was:

1. Edward, Prince of Wales (born 1894), eldest son of George V
2. Prince Albert, Duke of York (born 1895), second son of George V
3. Princess Elizabeth of York (born 1926), elder daughter of the Duke of York
4. Princess Margaret of York (born 1930), younger daughter of the Duke of York
5. Prince Henry, Duke of Gloucester (born 1900), third son of George V
6. Prince George, Duke of Kent (born 1902), fourth son of George V
7. Prince Edward of Kent (born 1935), only child of the Duke of Kent
8. Mary, Princess Royal (born 1897), only daughter of George V
9. George Lascelles, Viscount Lascelles (born 1923), elder son of the Princess Royal
10. Gerald Lascelles (born 1924), younger son of the Princess Royal

Upon his death, the throne passed to the first person in line, who became Edward VIII.

== Edward VIII ==
On the day of Edward VIII's abdication, 11 December 1936, the line of succession to the British throne was:

1. Prince Albert, Duke of York (born 1895), second son of George V
2. Princess Elizabeth of York (born 1926), elder daughter of the Duke of York
3. Princess Margaret of York (born 1930), younger daughter of the Duke of York
4. Prince Henry, Duke of Gloucester (born 1900), third son of George V
5. Prince George, Duke of Kent (born 1902), fourth son of George V
6. Prince Edward of Kent (born 1935), only child of the Duke of Kent
7. Mary, Princess Royal (born 1897), only daughter of George V
8. George Lascelles, Viscount Lascelles (born 1923), elder son of the Princess Royal
9. Gerald Lascelles (born 1924), younger son of the Princess Royal
10. Alexandra, Princess Arthur of Connaught, Duchess of Fife (born 1891), elder daughter of Louise, Princess Royal, Edward VII's deceased eldest daughter

Upon his abdication, the throne passed to the first person in line, who became George VI.

== George VI ==
On the day of George VI's death, 6 February 1952, the line of succession to the British throne was:

1. Princess Elizabeth, Duchess of Edinburgh (born 1926), elder daughter of George VI
2. Prince Charles of Edinburgh (born 1948), only son of Princess Elizabeth
3. Princess Anne of Edinburgh (born 1950), only daughter of Princess Elizabeth
4. Princess Margaret (born 1930), younger daughter of George VI
5. Prince Henry, Duke of Gloucester (born 1900), third son of George V
6. Prince William of Gloucester (born 1941), elder son of the Duke of Gloucester
7. Prince Richard of Gloucester (born 1944), younger son of the Duke of Gloucester
8. Prince Edward, Duke of Kent (born 1935), elder son of Prince George, Duke of Kent, George V's deceased fourth son
9. Prince Michael of Kent (born 1942), younger son of Prince George, Duke of Kent
10. Princess Alexandra of Kent (born 1936), only daughter of Prince George, Duke of Kent

Upon his death, the throne passed to the first person in line, who became Elizabeth II.

== Elizabeth II ==
On the day of Elizabeth II's death, 8 September 2022, the line of succession to the British throne was determined by the Succession to the Crown Act 2013:

1. Charles, Prince of Wales (born 1948), eldest son of Elizabeth II
2. Prince William, Duke of Cambridge (born 1982), elder son of the Prince of Wales
3. Prince George of Cambridge (born 2013), eldest child of the Duke of Cambridge
4. Princess Charlotte of Cambridge (born 2015), second child of the Duke of Cambridge
5. Prince Louis of Cambridge (born 2018), third child of the Duke of Cambridge
6. Prince Harry, Duke of Sussex (born 1984), younger son of the Prince of Wales
7. Archie Mountbatten-Windsor (born 2019), elder child of the Duke of Sussex
8. Lilibet Mountbatten-Windsor (born 2021), younger child of the Duke of Sussex
9. Prince Andrew, Duke of York (born 1960), second son of Elizabeth II
10. Princess Beatrice, Mrs Edoardo Mapelli Mozzi (born 1988), elder daughter of the Duke of York

Upon her death, the throne passed to the first person in line, who became Charles III.

== Charles III ==
Currently, the line of succession to the British throne is:

1. William, Prince of Wales (born 1982), elder son of Charles III
2. Prince George of Wales (born 2013), eldest child of the Prince of Wales
3. Princess Charlotte of Wales (born 2015), second child of the Prince of Wales
4. Prince Louis of Wales (born 2018), third child of the Prince of Wales
5. Prince Harry, Duke of Sussex (born 1984), younger son of Charles III
6. Prince Archie of Sussex (born 2019), elder child of the Duke of Sussex
7. Princess Lilibet of Sussex (born 2021), younger child of the Duke of Sussex
8. Andrew Mountbatten-Windsor (born 1960), second son of Elizabeth II
9. Princess Beatrice, Mrs Edoardo Mapelli Mozzi (born 1988), elder daughter of Andrew Mountbatten-Windsor
10. Sienna Mapelli Mozzi (born 2021), elder child of Princess Beatrice
