= Will of Henry VIII =

Monarch's final will and testament

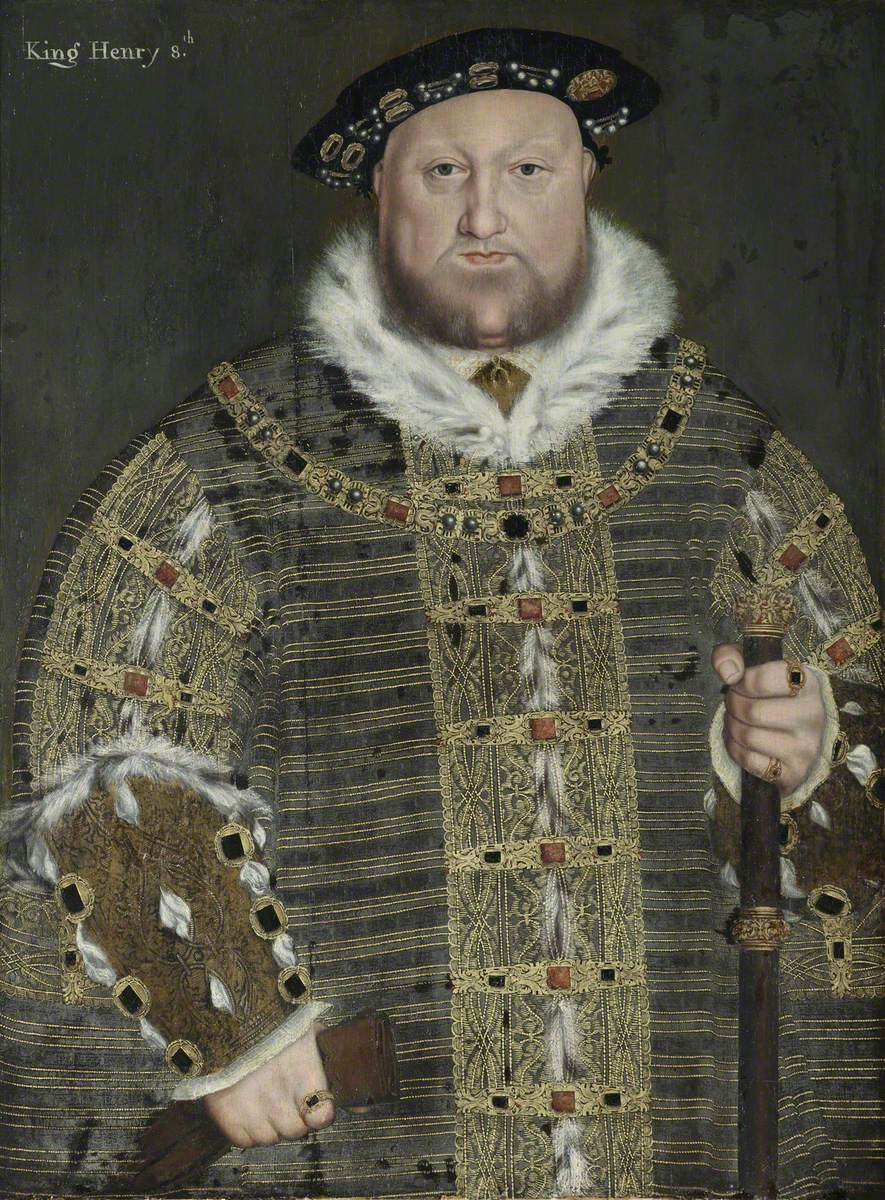
Portrait of Henry VIII from 1547, the year of his death.

The will of King Henry VIII of England was a significant constitutional document, or set of contested documents created in the 1530s and 1540s, affecting English, Scottish and Irish politics for the rest of the 16th century. In conjunction with legislation passed by the English Parliament, it was supposed to have a regulative effect in deciding the succession to the three following monarchs of the House of Tudor, the three legitimate and illegitimate children (the Third Succession Act expressly recognised the illegitimacy of Henry's daughters) of King Henry VIII. Its actual legal and constitutional status was much debated; and arguably the House of Stuart's succession to the English and Irish thrones after Elizabeth I did not respect Henry's wishes.

== Last testament ==
Henry VIII made a final revision to his last will and testament on 30 December 1546. It was signed using the "dry stamp", a device in use since 1545 and under the control of Anthony Denny and John Gates. It confirmed the line of succession as one living male and six living females. It began with Henry's three children, Edward, Mary and Elizabeth, followed by the three daughters of Frances Grey, Duchess of Suffolk, who was the second child and eldest daughter of Henry VIII's younger sister, Princess Mary. Last in the line of succession was the daughter of Eleanor Clifford, Countess of Cumberland, who was the third child and younger daughter of the king's younger sister, Princess Mary.

1. Edward
2. Mary
3. Elizabeth
4. Jane
5. Katherine
6. Mary
7. Margaret

The will containing the line of succession was read, stamped and sealed on 30 December and placed in the custody of Edward Seymour, Earl of Hertford. After Henry died on the night of 27–28 January 1547, the will was locked in a box to which only Hertford had the key, delaying its reading to Parliament by Henry’s principal secretary until Hertford returned the key after he had secured the person of Prince Edward, Henry’s son and heir. The document is still extant, but this fact was not generally known or accepted by the 1560s, when some believed it was lost, or had been destroyed.

== Executors ==
The will appointed 16 executors. The executors had little impact in the short term because its powers were given to a smaller group. The executors were officially (with one other) the council of King Edward VI until 12 March 1547, when Protector Somerset nominated the council. The effective end of the Somerset Protectorate came in early 1550. Those executors who were still alive (13 of the original 16, Browne, Denny and then Wriothesley having died) had a leading constitutional role, in theory from 13 October 1549.

The executors comprised:

Name	Position/profession	Religious orientation	Date of death
Thomas Bromley	Chief Justice of the King's Bench	(Unknown, mostly absent)	1555
Sir Anthony Browne	Courtier	Catholic	1548
Thomas Cranmer	Archbishop of Canterbury	Reformer	1556
Sir Anthony Denny	Courtier	Reformer	1549
John Dudley, Viscount Lisle	Military leader	Reformer	1553
Sir William Herbert	Courtier	Reformer	1570
Sir Edward Montague	Chief Justice of the Common Pleas	(Unknown, mostly absent)	1557
Sir Edward North	Lawyer	Neutral	1564
Sir William Paget	Politician	Neutral	1563
William Paulet, Baron St John of Basing	Politician	Neutral	1572
John Russell	Admiral	Reformer	1555
Edward Seymour, Earl of Hertford	Military leader	Reformer	1552
Cuthbert Tunstall	Bishop of Durham	Catholic	1559
Sir Edward Wotton	Administrator	Possibly Catholic	1551
Nicholas Wotton	Cleric and diplomat	Possibly Catholic	1567
Thomas Wriothesley	Administrator	Catholic	1550

Pollard wrote that the traditional view, that the balance of the group of executors on the religious question was deliberately poised to create an equilibrium, is mistaken since the exclusion of Stephen Gardiner tipped the balance to the evangelical reformers. MacCulloch considers that in 1550, after the fall of Somerset, there was a balance but that the evangelicals manoeuvred to a position of superiority.

== Third Succession Act ==
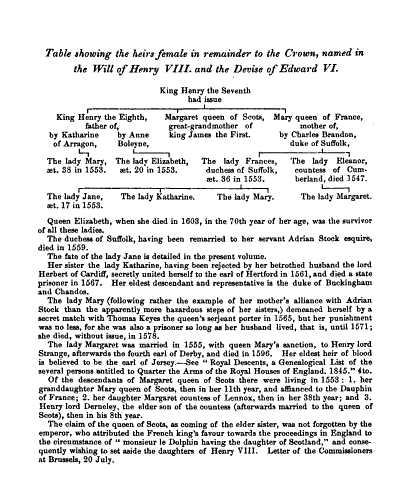
Notes by John Gough Nichols, showing the effect of the will of Henry VIII on the succession to the throne of England

The constitutional standing of Henry VIII's last will depended on the Third Succession Act that received royal assent in 1544. Section VI of the act provides that the line of succession, if not continued by the king's children by his marriages, should be regulated by the contents of the king's last will. The wording is conditional on the will being signed by the king's hand. The issue of the "dry stamp" signature was brought up in the context of Anglo-Scottish diplomacy, carried out by Robert Melville on behalf of Mary, Queen of Scots, in 1567. Since the provisions of the will disadvantaged all the claimants of the House of Stuart, the point remained important.
