= Thomas Keyes =

English politician

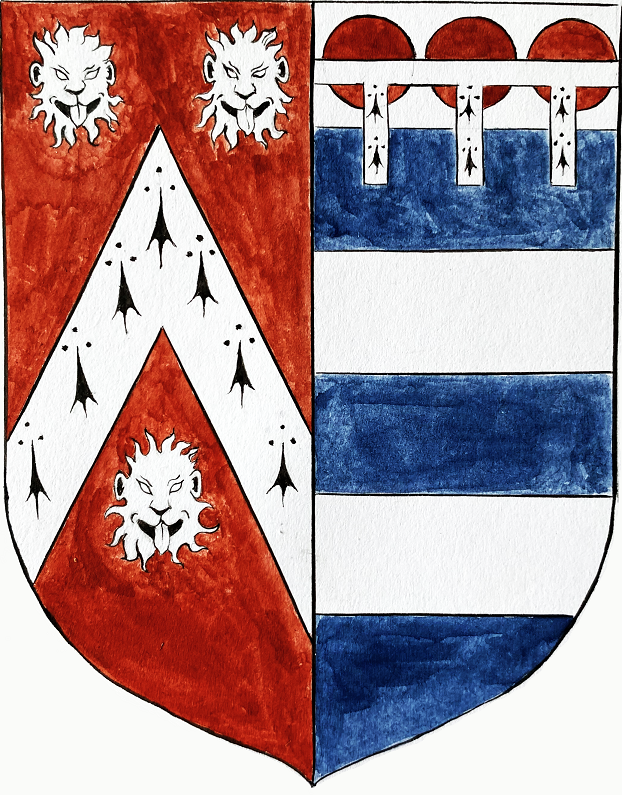
- The arms of Keyes impaling Grey of Ruthyn
- Born: Born by 1524
- Died: Before 5 September 1571
- Occupations: Captain of Sandgate Castle, Serjeant Porter
- Spouse(s): unknown first wife Lady Mary Grey (m. 1565)
- Children: Jane Merrick, other children whose names are unknown

Thomas Keyes or Keys (in or before 1524 – before 5 September 1571) was captain of Sandgate Castle, and serjeant porter to Queen Elizabeth I. Without the queen's consent, he married Lady Mary Grey, who had a claim to the throne.

== Life ==
Thomas Keyes, born by 1524, was the son and heir of Richard Keyes, esquire, who was twice married. According to Richardson, Thomas Keyes was the son of his father's first marriage, to Agnes Saunders, daughter of Henry Saunders of Ewell, Surrey. Richard Keyes married secondly Mildred Digges, a daughter of Sir John Scott (died 1533) of Scot's Hall at Smeeth, Kent, by Anne Pympe, the daughter and heiress of Reynold Pympe, esquire, of Nettlestead, Kent, and Elizabeth Pashley, the daughter of John Pashley, esquire. According to Bindoff and Sherwood, Thomas Keyes was the son of this marriage. Before her marriage to Richard Keyes, Mildred Scott had first been the wife of John Digges, esquire.

In 1528 Richard Keyes was in the service of King Henry VIII's first wife, Catherine of Aragon, and was later one of the King's serjeants at arms, an office he resigned in November 1541. He was a commissioner and paymaster for the building of Sandgate Castle during the years 1539-40. On 10 May 1538 he was granted a 21-year lease of the dissolved monastery of St. Radegund's near Dover. In his will, dated 15 November 1545, Richard Keyes bequeathed lodging to his son, Thomas, and Thomas's wife and servants, at St. Radegund's during the lifetime of Thomas' mother, and after her death, the leases of St. Radegund's and of Richard Keyes' house at Lewisham, Kent. At his father's death, Thomas Keyes also succeeded to his father's post as captain of Sandgate Castle, for which he later received an annuity of £40.

By 1545 Keyes had married a wife whose name is unknown, by whom he had at least one son and one daughter.

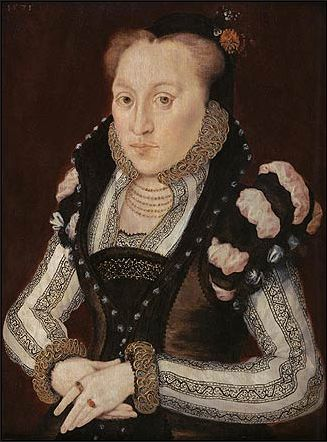
Portrait of Lady Mary Grey, attributed to Hans Eworth (1571)

In November 1554 Keyes was elected Member of Parliament for Hythe, Kent, through the support of Sir Thomas Cheney, Lord Warden of the Cinque Ports, who later left Keyes £40 in his will. Keyes' cousin, Nicholas Crispe, was elected at the same time, and both were fined for absence from the House in the parliamentary session in early 1555, and prosecuted in the court of King's Bench in Easter term of that year, where they also failed to appear. The case was brought to an end with the death of Queen Mary I, but while it was still ongoing Keyes was appointed serjeant porter of the Palace of Westminster.

During the years 1556-8 Keyes sued Francis Lambard for debt, and on 2 January 1558 he was at Dover, where he was charged with receiving levies for the relief of Calais.

Queen Elizabeth I acceded to the throne in November 1558, and in the pardon roll of 15 January 1559 Keyes is recorded as "Captain of Sandgate Castle, Folkestone, Kent, now Serjeant-Usher of the Household, late of St Radigund's, in Poulton, Co Kent".

In 1560 Keyes wrote to the Queen's Master of the Horse, Lord Robert Dudley, from Sandgate Castle concerning restrictions on the import of horses, and in August 1562 was acting as Dudley's deputy.

Keyes's first wife had died, and on the evening of 16 July 1565, while the Queen was absent attending the wedding of her kinsman Sir Henry Knollys (d. 21 December 1582), and Margaret Cave, the daughter of Sir Ambrose Cave, in his chamber by the Watergate at Westminster Keyes secretly married the Queen's kinswoman Lady Mary Grey, one of the three daughters of Henry Grey, 1st Duke of Suffolk and Frances Brandon. As a great-granddaughter of King Henry VII, and in accordance with the will of King Henry VIII, Mary Grey had a claim to the throne.

Upon hearing that the wedding had taken place, the Queen is said to have declared wrathfully that "I'll have no little bastard Keyes laying claim to my throne", while Sir William Cecil observed that the secret marriage was "an unhappy chance & monstrous". Apart from the disparity in their social positions, Keyes stood 6 feet 8 inches tall, while the Lady Mary was described by the Spanish ambassador as "little, crook-backed and very ugly".

On 19 August 1565, Thomas Keyes, Lady Mary, and her servant Frances Goldwell were examined concerning the marriage, and for this "monstrous" act of lese-majeste Keyes was committed to solitary confinement in the Fleet prison, while Lady Mary was placed under strict house arrest.

In June and July 1566 Keyes wrote several times to Cecil from the Fleet, begging him to intercede for him with the Queen. Keyes offered to have the marriage annulled, but on 5 August Edmund Grindal, Bishop of London, having investigated the matter, wrote to Cecil that if the marriage were to be dissolved it must be done judicially. On 21 December Keyes again wrote to Cecil, complaining of his harsh treatment in the Fleet, and in particular that he had become ill, having been served meat for his dinner which had been steeped in a liquid used to treat the prison's dogs for mange. On 7 July 1567, Keyes wrote again to Cecil. He was finally released from the Fleet in 1568, but was still not permitted to see his wife. On 6 October 1568, a free man, he wrote to Cecil from Lewisham, stating that he would rather die in the Queen's service than end his days banished from her presence. His plea went unregarded, and for the few remaining years of his life Keyes resided at Lewisham and then at Sandgate.

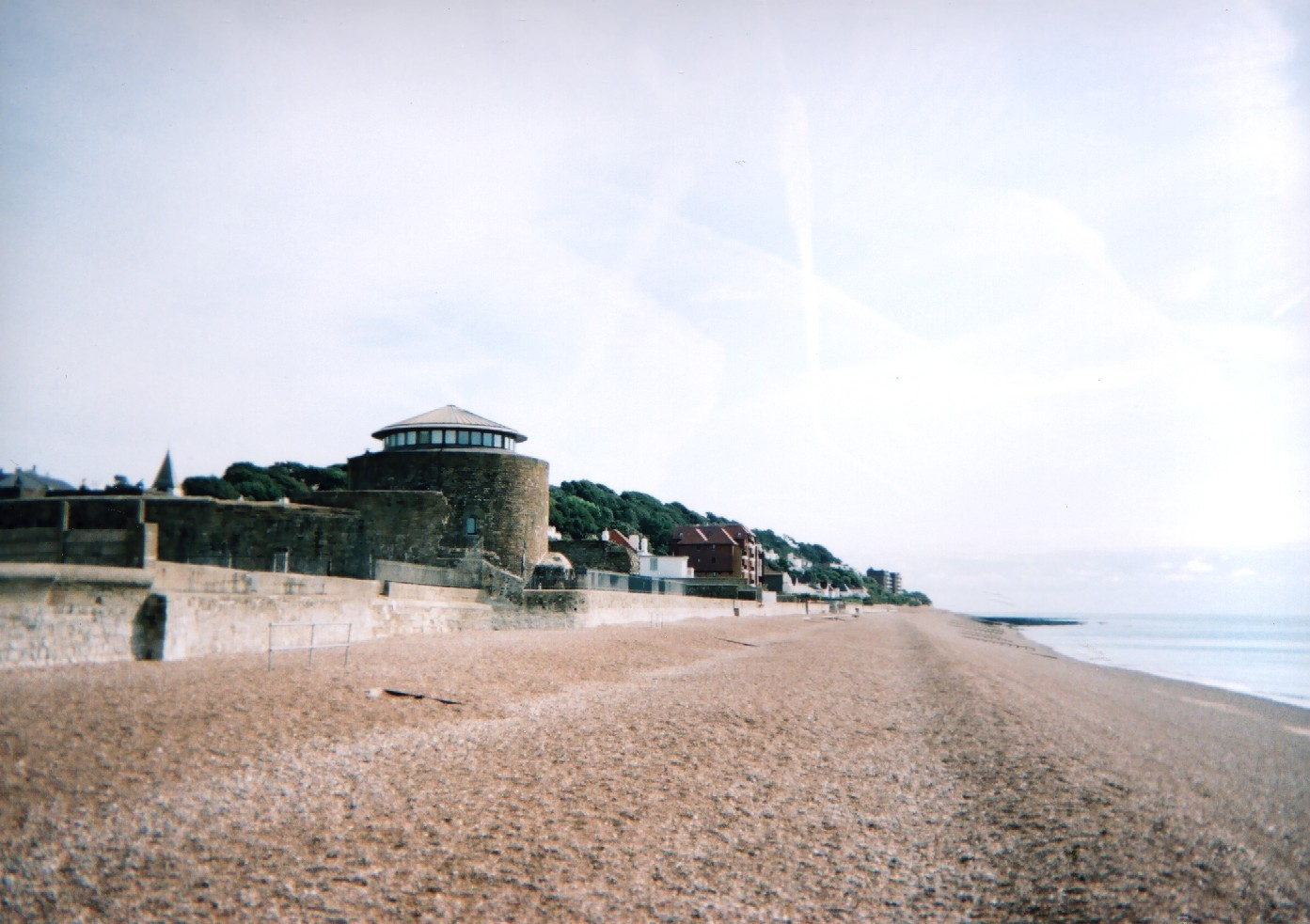
Sandgate Castle, Kent

In 1569, he was re-appointed captain of Sandgate Castle when England was threatened by a French-Spanish alliance, and, on 7 May 1570, he wrote to Archbishop Matthew Parker asking him to intercede for him with the Queen, again requesting that he might be permitted to live with his wife. In 1571 Keyes made an unsuccessful bid to be re-elected to parliament for Hythe.

Keyes died shortly before 5 September 1571, on which date William Brooke, 10th Baron Cobham, wrote to Cecil to inform him of the death of Thomas Keyes, serjeant porter, requesting that his brother, Thomas Brooke, be granted Keyes's former post. The news was broken to Keyes's wife three days later at Gresham House, where Lady Mary had been living, first under house arrest, and later as an unwelcome guest, for some years. According to a letter from Sir Thomas Gresham to Cecil on 8 September, Lady Mary had taken the news of Keyes's death "grievously".
