= Lady Katherine Grey =

English noblewoman (1540–1568)

- Lady Herbert; Countess of Hertford
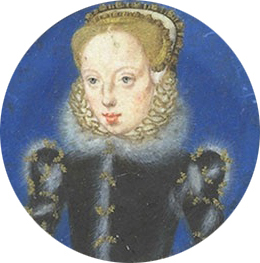
- Miniature by Levina Teerlinc, c. 1560
- Born: 25 August 1540; Bradgate House, near Leicester
- Died: 26 January 1568 (aged 27); Cockfield Hall, Yoxford, Suffolk
- Burial: Salisbury Cathedral
- Spouse: Henry Herbert, Lord Herbert (m. 1553; ann. 1554) Edward Seymour, 1st Earl of Hertford (m. 1560)
- Issue: Edward Seymour, Lord Beauchamp; Thomas Seymour
- House: Grey
- Father: Henry Grey, Duke of Suffolk
- Mother: Lady Frances Brandon

Katherine Seymour, Countess of Hertford (née Lady Katherine Grey; 25 August 1540 – 26 January 1568) was a younger sister of Lady Jane Grey.

A granddaughter of Henry VIII's sister Mary, she emerged as a prospective successor to her cousin, Elizabeth I, before incurring Queen Elizabeth's wrath by secretly marrying Edward Seymour, 1st Earl of Hertford. Arrested after the Queen was informed of their clandestine marriage, Katherine (as Lady Hertford) lived in captivity until her death, having borne two sons in the Tower of London.

== Family and claim to the throne ==
Lady Katherine was born on 25 August 1540 at Bradgate House, near Leicester, the second surviving daughter of Henry Grey, Duke of Suffolk, by his marriage to Lady Frances Brandon. She was the younger sister of Lady Jane Grey and elder sister of Lady Mary Grey. Katherine Grey's maternal grandparents were Charles Brandon, 1st Duke of Suffolk, and Mary Tudor, Dowager Queen of France, youngest surviving daughter of Henry VII and Elizabeth of York.

Through their grandmother, the Grey sisters had a close claim in the line of succession to the English throne. They were preceded in the line of succession only by Henry VIII's three children – Prince Edward, Lady Mary, and Lady Elizabeth – and the descendants of Princess Margaret, the elder daughter of Henry VII and Queen Consort of Scotland, after 1542 represented by Mary, Queen of Scots. However, Henry VIII had excluded the Scottish regal line from the English succession in his Will, placing the Grey sisters next-in-line after his own children.

== First marriage ==
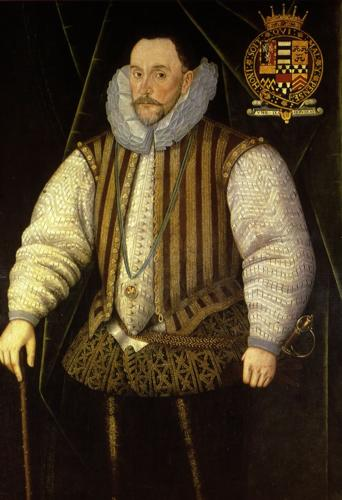
Henry Herbert, 2nd Earl of Pembroke (1534-1601)

Some time before August 1552, Katherine Grey was betrothed to Henry, Lord Herbert, heir apparent to William Herbert, 1st Earl of Pembroke. In 1553, as Edward VI was dying, the King and his Chief Minister, John Dudley, 1st Duke of Northumberland, planned to exclude Edward's sister Mary Tudor from the succession in favour of Katherine's elder sister, Jane. According to the Letters Patent of 21 June 1553, Lady Katherine was to be second in the line of succession behind her sister and heirs-male. Jane had been married to Northumberland's son, Lord Guildford Dudley, on 25 May 1553.

On the same occasion, Katherine was married to Lord Herbert at Durham House. After the wedding, Katherine (now Lady Herbert) went to live with her husband at Baynard's Castle beside the Thames. When Jane's accession to the throne failed, Henry's father sought to distance himself from the Grey family by separating his son from Katherine and seeking the annulment of the marriage; this was probably achieved in early 1554, as the union had not been consummated. Meanwhile, her sister Jane and her father (the Duke of Suffolk) had been executed in February 1554 after the suppression of Wyatt's Rebellion.

== Prospective royal heir under Mary I and Elizabeth I ==
During the first phase of Queen Mary I's reign, Katherine was senior heir-in-line to the throne as Mary was yet unmarried and her younger sister Elizabeth was regarded as illegitimate. Demoted when Elizabeth was declared heir, Katherine's claim came to the fore again when Queen Elizabeth I acceded to the throne in November 1558. At one point the Queen was apparently contemplating Katherine as a potential Protestant heir, with rumours of a possible adoption, but any such development was terminated upon Katherine's clandestine marriage to Lord Hertford.

== Second marriage ==
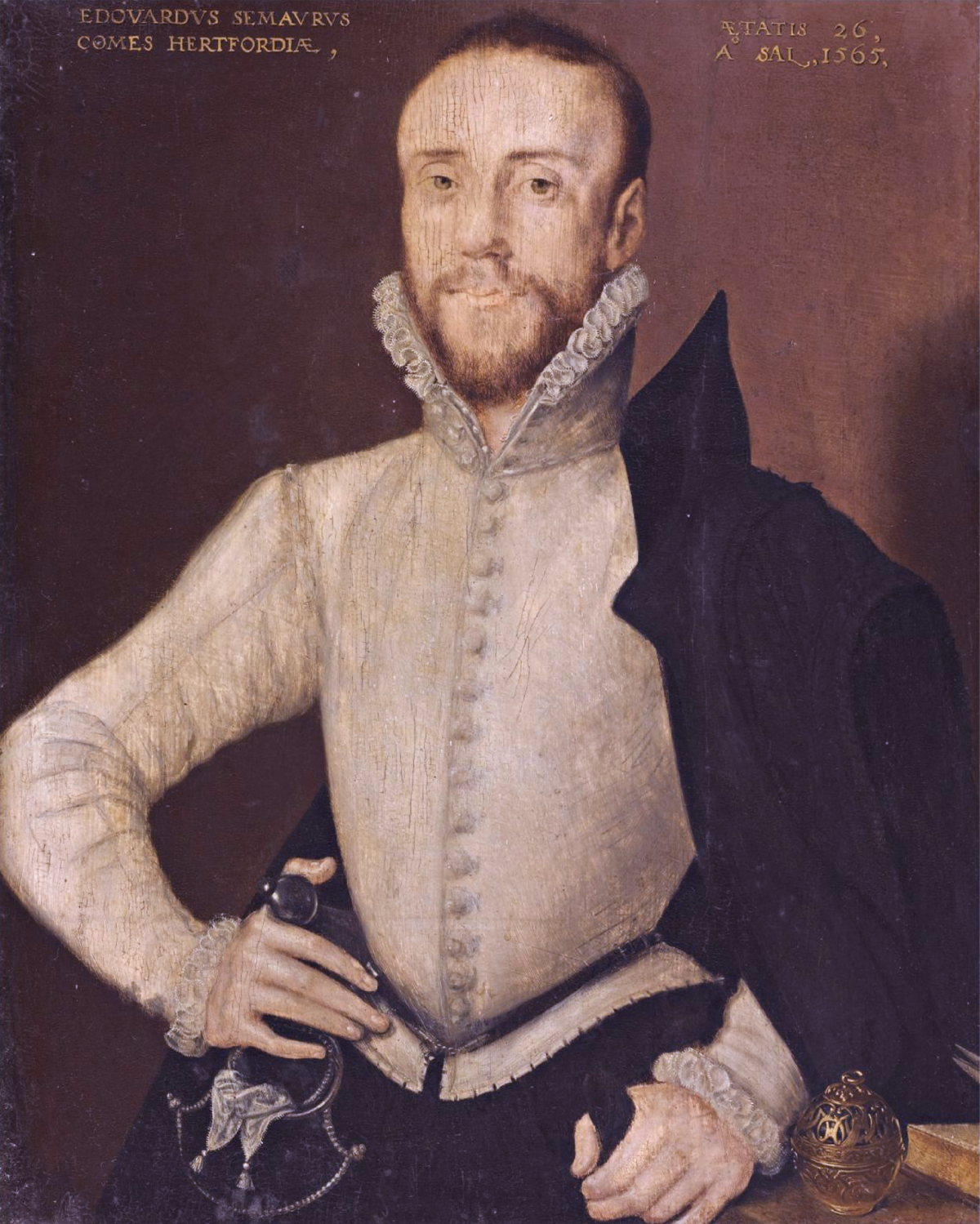
Oil on panel portrait of Edward Seymour attributed to Hans Eworth

One of Katherine's friends, Lady Jane Seymour, daughter of the Duke of Somerset, introduced her brother, Edward Seymour, 1st Earl of Hertford, to Lady Katherine Grey (so restyled after the annulment of her first marriage). Without royal assent, the two were married in late December 1560 during a secret ceremony at Lord Hertford's house in Cannon Row, where Lady Jane Seymour was the sole witness.

Soon thereafter, the Queen despatched Lord Hertford with Thomas Cecil, eldest son of Sir William Cecil, on a grand tour across Europe "for the improvement of their education". The Earl of Hertford provided his wife with a document that would, in the event of his death, enable her to prove the marriage and inherit his property, but apparently Katherine lost the document. Thus, after Lady Jane Seymour died of tuberculosis in 1561, Katherine was unable to prove that they had ever been married.

== Imprisonment ==
Katherine concealed the marriage from everyone for months, even after she became pregnant; in her eighth month of pregnancy and on progress with the royal court to Ipswich, she decided to ask someone to plead for her with the Queen. She first confided in Bess of Hardwick, who refused to listen to Katherine and berated her for implicating her. Katherine then went to her late sister's brother-in-law, Robert Dudley. Visiting his bedroom in the middle of the night, she explained her dilemma. As Dudley's room adjoined the Queen's chambers, he was afraid they might be overheard or that he might be caught with a visibly pregnant woman at his bedside, and tried to get rid of Katherine as soon as he could. The next day he told Elizabeth everything he knew regarding Katherine and her pregnancy.

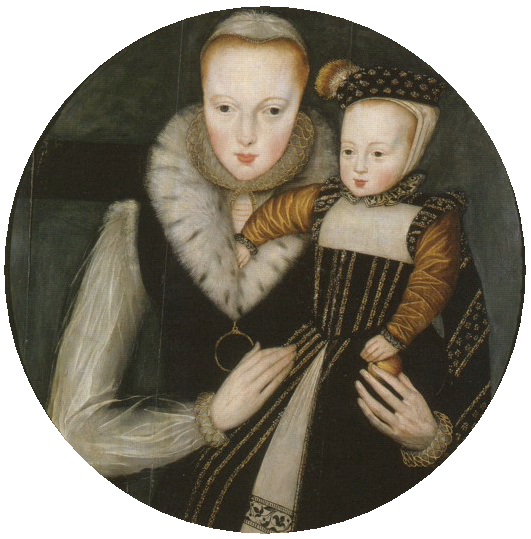
Lady Katherine Grey with her elder son Edward, Lord Beauchamp.

Elizabeth was infuriated that her cousin had married without her knowledge or consent. The marriage also upset Anglo-Scottish diplomacy, as the possibility of a union between Katherine and the Earl of Arran, a young and unstable nobleman with a strong claim to the Scottish throne, had thereby been removed as an option. Elizabeth also disapproved of her choice of husband and, still unmarried, also feared that Katherine's ability to bear male offspring could possibly facilitate a rebellion in support of Katherine as queen. To Katherine's misfortune, her claim to the throne was at the time argued by a book written by John Hales.

Elizabeth imprisoned Katherine in the Tower of London, where Edward Seymour was sent to join her on his return to England. Bess of Hardwick was also imprisoned, as Elizabeth had become convinced that the marriage was part of a wider conspiracy against the Crown. Sir Edward Warner, Lieutenant of The Tower, permitted secret visits between Katherine and Edward. Warner reported that the furnishings of Katherine's room, which were provided from the Royal Wardrobe in the Tower, had been damaged by her pet monkey and dogs. While imprisoned in the Tower, Katherine gave birth to two sons:

- Edward Seymour (1561–1612)
- Thomas Seymour (1562/3, Tower of London – 8 August 1600). Baptized on 11 February 1563, he married Isabel Onley (d. 20 August 1619), daughter of Edward Onley MP, of Catesby, Northamptonshire. The couple had no issue, and were buried at St. Margaret's Church, Westminster, where there is a monument with effigies in their memory.

In 1562, the marriage was annulled and the Seymours were censured as fornicators for "carnal copulation" by the Archbishop of Canterbury. This rendered the children illegitimate and thereby ineligible as successors to the throne. Nonetheless, this did not stop their being courted as potential heirs to the Crown.

== Final years ==
After the birth of Katherine's second child in 1563, the enraged Elizabeth ordered her permanent separation from her husband and elder son. Katherine was removed to the care of her uncle, Sir John Grey, at Pirgo. She stayed there until November 1564, when she was transferred to the charge of Sir William Petre. For two years she was in his custody, and probably resided at Ingatestone Hall; then she was removed to the care of Sir John Wentworth (a kinsman of Petre's first wife) at Gosfield Hall, and after seventeen months' confinement there was taken to Cockfield Hall, Yoxford, in Suffolk.

There, Lady Katherine died fourteen days later on 26 January 1568 at the age of 27 of consumption. She was interred at the Cockfield Chapel in Yoxford Church, Suffolk, before her body was moved to Salisbury Cathedral to be buried alongside her husband.

== Family tree ==
The following chart illustrates Lady Katherine Grey's relationship to the House of Tudor and other claimants to the English throne. Italics indicate people who predeceased Edward VI; Arabic numerals indicate the line of succession to Edward VI at the time of his death according to Henry VIII's will; and Roman numerals indicate the line of succession at the time of Edward VI's death according to Edward's will.

Henry VII	Elizabeth of York
Henry VIII	Margaret Tudor	Mary Tudor	Charles Brandon
Edward VI	Mary I (1)	Elizabeth I (2)	James V of Scotland	Margaret Douglas	Frances Brandon	Henry Grey
Mary, Queen of Scots	Henry Stuart	Jane Grey (3, I)	Katherine Grey (4, II)	Mary Grey (5, III)

== In popular culture ==
Katherine Grey was portrayed by Laura Clipsham in Trevor Nunn's film Lady Jane (1986) and Isabella Brownson in the Amazon Prime series My Lady Jane (2024).
