= Adrian Stokes (courtier) =

16th-century English politician

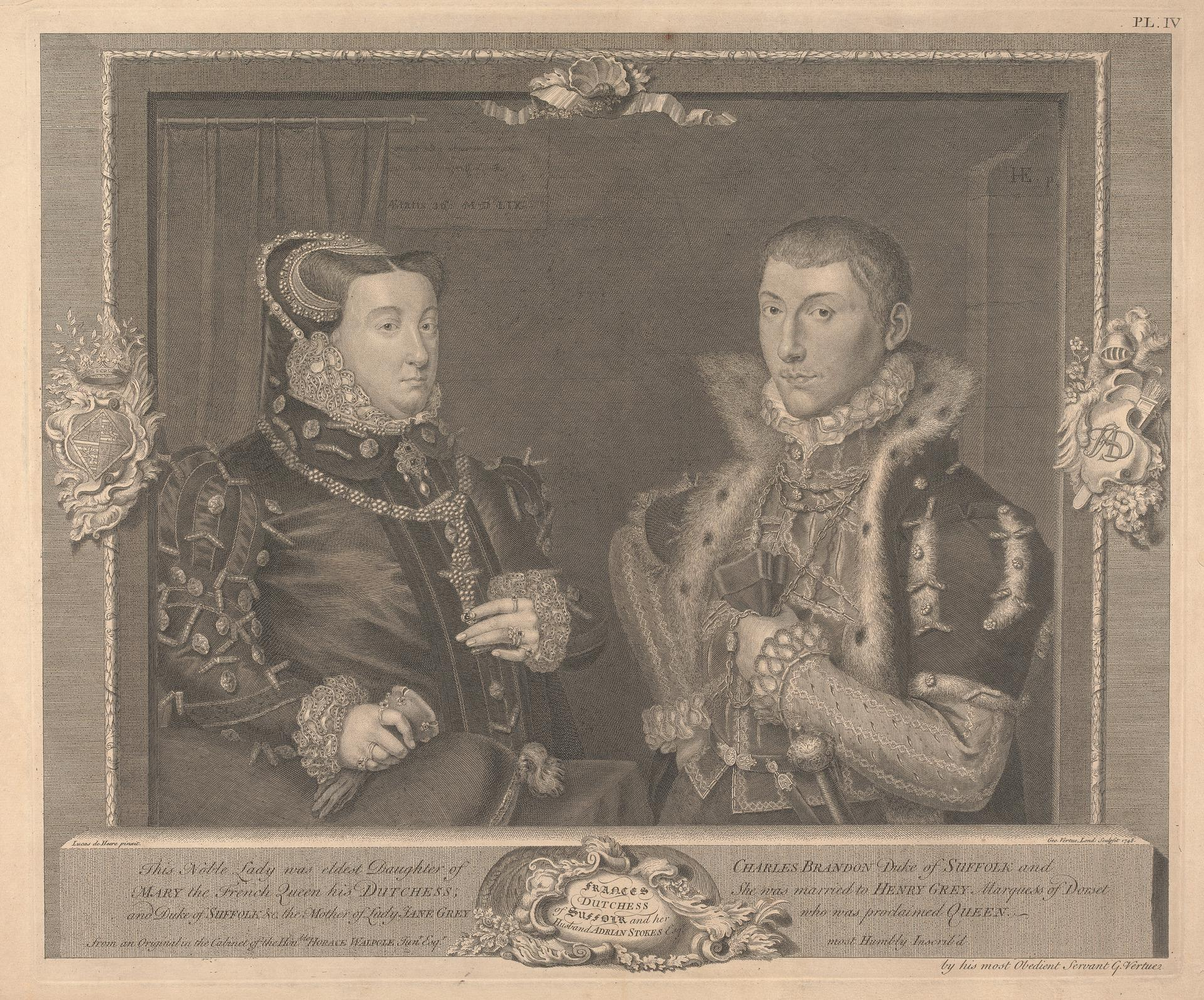
- A famous portrait, purportedly of Frances Grey and Adrian Stokes, made by George Vertue in 1748
- Born: 4 March 1519; Prestwold, Leicestershire
- Died: November 3, 1585 (aged 66)
- Burial place: Beaumanor Hall

Adrian Stokes (4 March 1519 – 3 November 1585) was an English courtier and politician.

== Biography ==
Stokes was probably a younger son of a gentry family from Prestwold, Leicestershire. He became Master of the Horse to Frances Grey, Duchess of Suffolk, and married her on 1 March 1555, just over a year after the execution of her first husband, Henry Grey, 1st Duke of Suffolk. They had three children, all of whom died in infancy.

Following the accession of Elizabeth I, rumours circulated that the queen would like to marry her master of the horse Robert Dudley, later earl of Leicester in emulation of her cousin and Stokes.

The Duchess of Suffolk died in 1559, leaving Stokes a life interest in most of her land. The manors he held included Beaumanor, Leicestershire and he was elected to the English House of Commons as knight of the shire (MP) for Leicestershire in 1559. In 1564 Stokes was classified by his bishop as a committed Protestant, and he served on local commissions to enforce attendance at church and to discover recusants.

Stokes was elected for Leicestershire again in 1571. In October 1571 his step-daughter Lady Mary Grey asked to be allowed to live with her step-father at Beaumanor. The following year Stokes married Anne Carew, daughter of Sir Nicholas Carew and widow of Sir Nicholas Throckmorton, an eminent diplomat and politician. By her first marriage Anne was the mother of ten sons and three daughters. Once Stokes was safely remarried, Lady Mary was allowed to live at Beaumanor. Stokes succeeded Throckmorton as keeper of Brigstock park, Northamptonshire.

Although his second marriage brought him control of the considerable Throckmorton estates, he also became responsible for the court expenses and dowries of his Throckmorton stepdaughters. The keepership of Brigstock also involved him in legal disputes over poaching and other encroachments. In Warwickshire he became notorious for the damage caused to the church at Astley, where he pulled down the spire rather than repair it and stripped the roof of its valuable lead. He died in 1585 and was buried in the chapel at Beaumanor.
