= Lady Jane (1986 film) =

- U.S. theatrical release poster
- Directed by: Trevor Nunn
- Screenplay by: David Edgar
- Story by: Chris Bryant
- Produced by: Peter Snell
- Starring: Helena Bonham Carter; Cary Elwes
- Cinematography: Douglas Slocombe
- Edited by: Anne V. Coates
- Music by: Stephen Oliver
- Production company: Capital Equipment Leasing
- Distributed by: Paramount Pictures (through United International Pictures)
- Release date: 7 February 1986
- Running time: 142 minutes
- Country: United Kingdom
- Language: English
- Budget: $8.5 million
- Box office: $277,646

Lady Jane is a 1986 British costume-historical romance film, directed by Trevor Nunn, written by David Edgar, and starring Helena Bonham Carter as the title character. It tells the story of Lady Jane Grey, her marriage to Lord Guildford Dudley, and her reign as the "Nine Days' Queen" of England following the death of King Edward VI.

The story had previously been turned into a 1936 film, Tudor Rose, and a 1923 silent film, Lady Jane Grey; Or, The Court of Intrigue.

== Plot ==
The death of Henry VIII of England throws his kingdom into chaos as his successor, Edward VI, is both under-age and in poor health. Anticipating the young king's imminent death from tuberculosis and anxious to keep England true to the Protestant Reformation by keeping the Catholic Princess Mary from the throne, John Dudley, 1st Duke of Northumberland, Lord President of the Council and second only to the king in power, hatches a plan to marry his second son, Lord Guildford, to Lady Jane Grey, and have the royal physician keep the young king Edward VI alive—albeit in excruciating pain—long enough to get him to name Jane his heir.

Jane is unhappy with the proposed marriage, and is forced into it through corporal punishment by her parents. At first, Jane and Guildford treat their union as a marriage of convenience, but later fall deeply in love.

After King Edward VI dies, Jane is placed on the throne. She is troubled by the questionable legality of her accession, but after consulting with Guildford, turns the tables on John Dudley and the others who thought to use her as a puppet.

After only nine days, however, Queen Jane's council abandon her because of her designs for reforming the country. The council then supports Mary, who at first imprisons Jane and Guildford.

Consumed with guilt, Jane's father, the Duke of Suffolk, raises a rebellion to restore her to the throne, presumably in concert with Thomas Wyatt's rebellion. When the rebellion fails, Queen Mary I offers to spare Jane's life if she renounces her Protestant faith. When she refuses, Jane, her father, and Guildford are executed.

== Cast ==
- Helena Bonham Carter as Lady Jane Grey
- Cary Elwes as Lord Guildford Dudley, Jane's husband
- Jane Lapotaire as Queen Mary I
- Patrick Stewart as Henry Grey, Duke of Suffolk, Jane's father
- Sara Kestelman as Lady Frances Brandon, Jane's mother
- Michael Hordern as Doctor Feckenham
- John Wood as John Dudley, 1st Duke of Northumberland
- Jill Bennett as Mrs. Ellen, Lady-in-Waiting
- Joss Ackland as Sir John Bridges
- Ian Hogg as Sir John Gates
- Richard Johnson as the Earl of Arundel
- Warren Saire as King Edward VI
- Lee Montague as Renard, Spanish Ambassador
- Richard Vernon as The Marquess of Winchester
- Adele Anderson as Lady Warwick
- Pip Torrens as Thomas
- Matthew Guinness as Doctor Owen
- Guy Henry as Lord Robert Dudley
- W. Morgan Sheppard as Executioner

== Locations ==
Dover Castle was used to represent the Tower of London in the film. Interior scenes of Hever Castle in Kent were used. The Long Gallery was used in the scene where Jane visits Queen Mary. The moat around Leeds Castle, also in Kent, was used in the scene where Dudley first visits Lady Jane. Several scenes were filmed at Haddon Hall in Derbyshire. The castle and moat of Herstmonceux Castle in East Sussex was also used, when the Royal Greenwich Observatory was located there.

== Reception ==
On Rotten Tomatoes the film has an approval rating of 56% based on reviews from nine critics. Audiences polled by CinemaScore gave the film an average grade of "B+" on an A+ to F scale.
