= Lady Mary Grey =

English noblewoman (1545–1578)

Lady Mary Keyes
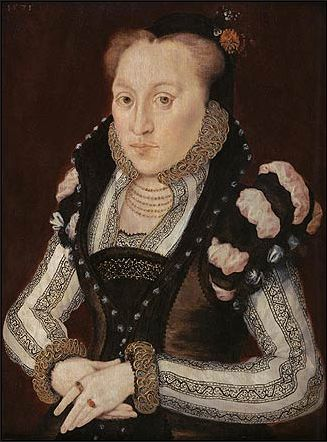
- Born: 20 April 1545
- Died: 20 April 1578 (aged 33)
- Burial: 14 May 1578; Westminster Abbey
- Spouse: Thomas Keyes (m. 1565; died 1571)
- Father: Henry Grey, Duke of Suffolk
- Mother: Lady Frances Brandon

Lady Mary Keyes (née Grey; 20 April 1545 – 20 April 1578) was the youngest daughter of Henry Grey, Duke of Suffolk, and Frances Brandon, and through her mother had a claim on the crown of England.

== Early life ==
Mary Grey, born about 20 April 1545, was the third and youngest daughter of Henry Grey, 1st Duke of Suffolk and Lady Frances Brandon, daughter of Charles Brandon, 1st Duke of Suffolk and Mary Tudor, the younger of the two daughters of King Henry VII and Elizabeth of York. Mary had two sisters, Lady Jane Grey and Lady Katherine Grey.

== Throne claims ==
As great-grandchildren of Henry VII, Mary and her sisters were potential heirs to the crown. When King Edward VI died on 6 July 1553, he left a will (approved by John Dudley, 1st Duke of Northumberland) naming Mary's eldest sister, Jane, recently married to Northumberland's son Guildford Dudley, to succeed to the throne. Some weeks before, on 25 May 1553, Mary Grey, still a young child, had been betrothed to her distant cousin Arthur Grey, 14th Baron Grey de Wilton, whose father was an ally of Northumberland. The attempt to secure a Protestant succession failed, and although Edward was briefly succeeded by Jane, the Privy Council of England changed sides and proclaimed his half sister, Mary I, as queen. Northumberland was executed on 22 August 1553. Queen Mary spared Jane's life and the lives of Jane's husband and father, but after the suppression of the Wyatt rebellion in early 1554, all three were executed, Jane and her husband on 12 February 1554, and Jane's father shortly thereafter, on 23 February. After Queen Mary's accession Mary Grey's betrothal to Arthur Grey was dissolved.

On 1 March 1555, Mary's mother, Frances Brandon, took a second husband, Adrian Stokes. When Frances died on November 20, 1559, she left a life estate in most of her property to Stokes, while Mary received only a small inheritance yielding a modest income of £20 a year. However, Queen Elizabeth I, who had acceded to the throne in November 1558, appointed Mary as one of her Maids of Honour and granted her a pension of £80.

Since Elizabeth was childless, the two surviving Grey sisters were next in the line of succession under the will of Henry VIII, and were not permitted to marry without the Queen's permission. In December 1560, however, Katherine secretly married Edward Seymour, the eldest son of the Protector Somerset, incurring the Queen's unrelenting displeasure. As the ceremony had been performed by a priest who was never subsequently identified, and the only witness was Seymour's sister, Lady Jane Seymour, who died shortly after the marriage, Elizabeth was able to treat the marriage as though it had never taken place, and on 12 March 1563, she obtained a declaration that the marriage was invalid and that Edward Seymour, Viscount Beauchamp, Katherine's eldest son by Seymour, was illegitimate. Both Katherine and her husband were confined to the Tower, and they were later held under house arrest.

== Marriage ==
Despite the disastrous consequences of her sister Katherine's secret marriage, Mary also married without the Queen's permission. On 16 July 1565, while Elizabeth was absent attending the marriage of her kinsman, Sir Henry Knollys (d. 21 December 1582), and Margaret Cave, the daughter of Sir Ambrose Cave, Mary secretly married Elizabeth's sergeant porter, Thomas Keyes, son of Richard Keyes, esquire, of East Greenwich, Kent, by Agnes Saunders, the daughter of Henry Saunders of Ewell, Surrey. Having learned from her sister's experience, Mary took the precaution of having three of her cousins attend as witnesses, her childhood friend, Mary Willoughby, now the wife of Sir Matthew Arundell, and two of the daughters of Lady Stafford. The marriage was an unsuitable one for many reasons. Keyes was from a minor landed gentry family in Kent, was more than twice Mary's age, and was a widower with six or seven children. Moreover, Mary was described by the Spanish ambassador as 'little, crook-backed and very ugly', while Keyes stood 6 feet 8 inches tall. Sir William Cecil wrote to Sir Thomas Smith that 'The Sergeant Porter, being the biggest gentleman of this court, has married secretly the Lady Mary Grey, the least of all the court ... The offence is very great'.

== House arrest ==
Mary and her husband never saw each other again. Elizabeth confined Mary to house arrest with William Hawtrey (d. 1597) at Chequers in Buckinghamshire, where she remained for two years, while Keyes was committed to the Fleet. In August 1567, Mary, still under house arrest, was sent to live with her step-grandmother Katherine, Duchess of Suffolk, whom Charles Brandon, 1st Duke of Suffolk, had married after the death of Mary's grandmother, Mary Tudor. The Duchess wrote to Cecil expressing shock at the few pitiful household effects with which Mary arrived at her house in the Minories. Mary remained in the Duchess's household for almost two years, and is said to have been close to the Duchess's two children, Peregrine and Susan Bertie.

On 27 January 1568, at the age of 27, after suffering years of imprisonment, house arrest, and separation from her husband and two young sons, Katherine Grey died at Cockfield Hall, the house of Sir Owen Hopton in Yoxford, Suffolk. According to De Lisle, it is possible that she had starved herself to death. With Katherine's death, Mary was brought to relative prominence as the next heir to Elizabeth under the will of Henry VIII; since Katherine's two sons had been declared illegitimate, even Elizabeth had to take seriously Mary's claim to the English throne. In June 1569, Mary was therefore sent to live with Sir Thomas Gresham at his house in Bishopsgate and later at his country house at Osterley. Her stay with the Greshams was an unhappy one, however, as Sir Thomas was now half blind and in constant physical pain, and his wife, Anne, bitterly resented Mary's presence in the household.

== Later life ==
After enduring years in the Fleet, Mary's husband Thomas Keyes was released in 1569, and permitted to return to Kent. However, his health had been broken by the conditions of his imprisonment, and he died shortly before 3 September 1571. Mary begged Elizabeth for permission to bring up her husband's orphaned children from his first marriage, but her request was denied, and it was not until May 1572, after Mary had been under strict house arrest for seven years, that Elizabeth relented sufficiently to allow her to live where she pleased. However, for the time being, Mary had no friends to take her in, and insufficient income to live independently. She continued to reside as an unwelcome guest with the Greshams until Sir Thomas suggested that she be sent to live at Beaumanor in Leicestershire with her late mother's second husband, Adrian Stokes, who had recently married Anne Carew, the widow of Sir Nicholas Throckmorton. In 1573 Mary left the Gresham household for good, 'with all her books and rubbish', as Sir Thomas put it.

Mary did not stay long at Beaumanor. By February 1573, she was established in a house of her own in London in St Botolph's Without Aldgate, and by the end of 1577, she had been rehabilitated to the extent that she was appointed one of Elizabeth's Maids of Honour.

== Death ==
On 17 April 1578, while plague was raging in London, Mary became ill and drew up her will. She left her mother's jewels to her step-grandmother, the Duchess of Suffolk, gifts of plate to Lady Arundell and to Adrian Stokes's wife, and money to her godchild, Mary Merrick, a granddaughter of her late husband, Thomas Keyes. She left a jewel of a unicorn's horn, a talisman against poisoning, to the Duchess of Suffolk and a gilt bowl to Blanche Parry.

Mary died on 20 April 1578, her 33rd birthday. Elizabeth granted her an imposing funeral in Westminster Abbey, with the Duchess of Suffolk's daughter Susan Bertie, now Countess of Kent, as chief mourner. She was buried in her mother's tomb in the Abbey, where her grave is still unmarked.

In spite of the intrigues involving her sisters, it does not appear that Mary ever made a serious claim to the throne. After her death, according to the terms of Henry VIII's will, the chief claimant became Margaret Stanley, Countess of Derby, the only surviving child of Eleanor Brandon, second daughter of Henry VIII's younger sister, Mary Tudor.

== Ancestry ==
Ancestors of Lady Mary Grey

8. Thomas Grey, 1st Marquess of Dorset
4. Thomas Grey, 2nd Marquess of Dorset
9. Cecily Bonville, 7th Baroness Harington and 2nd Baroness Bonville
2. Henry Grey, Duke of Suffolk
10. Richard Wotton
5. Margaret Wotton
11. Anne Belknap
1. Lady Mary Grey
12. Sir William Brandon
6. Charles Brandon, 1st Duke of Suffolk
13. Elizabeth Bruyn
3. Lady Frances Brandon
14. Henry VII of England
7. Mary Tudor
15. Elizabeth of York

== Cultural depictions ==
Mary is the main character of Philippa Gregory's The Last Tudor (2016), the final instalment in The Plantagenet and Tudor Novels.

Leanda de Lisle's biography The Sisters Who Would Be Queen: Mary, Katherine, and Lady Jane Grey; A Tudor Tragedy was published in 2009 and was a NY Times bestseller.
