= William Herbert, 1st Earl of Pembroke (died 1570) =

English peer of the 16th century (1501-1570)

The Right Honourable The Earl of Pembroke KG PC
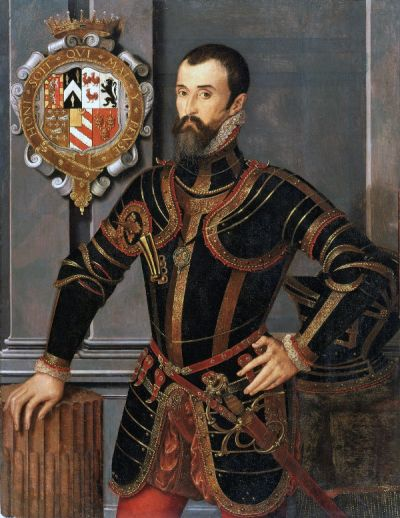
- The young William Herbert wearing Greenwich armour. Portrait at the National Museum in Cardiff.
- Born: c. 1501
- Died: 17 March 1570
- Title: 1st Earl of Pembroke
- Spouse(s): Anne Parr; Anne Talbot
- Children: 3 (including Henry Herbert, 2nd Earl of Pembroke)
- Parent(s): Sir Richard Herbert; Margaret Cradock

Arms of William Herbert, 1st Earl of Pembroke (Herbert of Ewyas, Herefordshire): Herbert (Per pale azure and gules, three lions rampant argent), differenced (for illegitimacy) by a bordure componée gules bezantée and or. The difference was dropped by the 3rd Earl, who bore Herbert undifferenced

William Herbert, 1st Earl of Pembroke, 1st Baron Herbert of Cardiff KG PC (c. 1501 – 17 March 1570) was a Welsh Tudor period nobleman, politician, and courtier.

Herbert was the son of Sir Richard Herbert and Margaret Cradock. His father was an illegitimate son of William Herbert, 1st Earl of Pembroke of the eighth creation (1468), by his mistress, Maud, daughter of Adam ap Howell Graunt.

== Early life ==
William Herbert's early life was distinguished by intense ambition coupled with an equally fierce temper and hot-headed nature. Described by John Aubrey as a "mad fighting fellow", the young Herbert began his career as a gentleman servant to the earl of Worcester. However, when a mercer called Vaughan was killed by Herbert, after an affray between some Welshmen and the watchmen for unknown reasons in Bristol, he fled to France.

Upon arrival, he immediately joined the service of King Francis I as a soldier, earning a reputation for courage and great skill on the battlefield. "In a short time he became eminent, and was favoured by the king, who afterwards recommended him to Henry VIII, who much valued him, and heaped favours and honours upon him". For his service to Henry, Herbert was granted the estates of Wilton, Remesbury, and Cardiff Castle, and his position as a man of means was secured.

Herbert's first wife, Anne Parr, was a sister of Queen Consort Katherine Parr, sixth wife to Henry VIII. He rose with the Parrs after his sister-in-law's marriage and was knighted in 1544. He had been granted Wilton Abbey and other land by Henry VIII by 1544. He soon pulled down the abbey and built the first Wilton House in its place; the house continues to be the seat of his descendants.

== Earldom ==
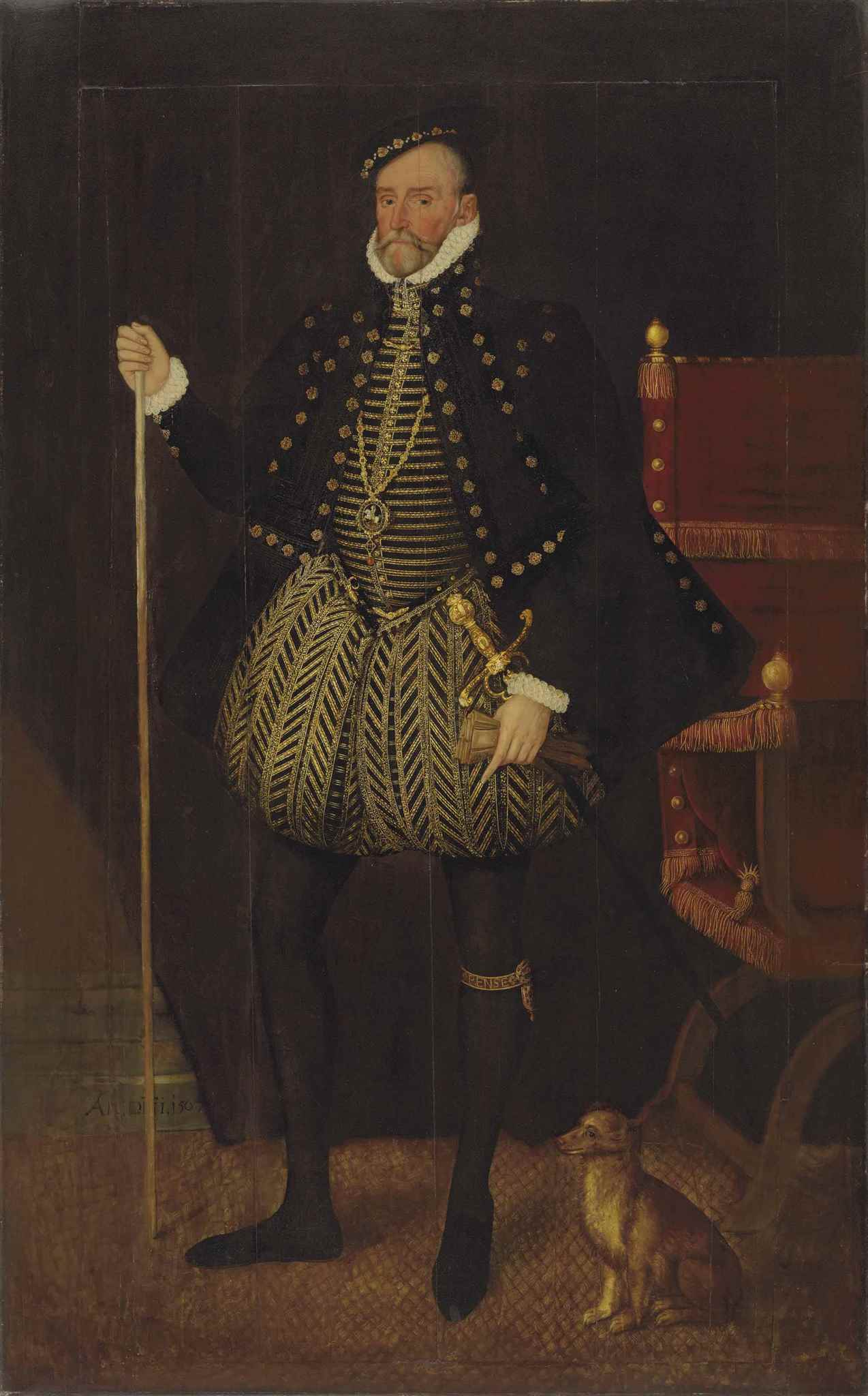
William Herbert, 1st Earl of Pembroke in 1567

Herbert was a guardian of the young King Edward VI after the death of Henry VIII in 1547. As an executor of Henry's will and the recipient of valuable grants of land, Herbert was a prominent and powerful person during Edward's reign, with both the protector Edward Seymour, 1st Duke of Somerset and his rival, John Dudley, 1st Duke of Northumberland, angling for his support. He threw in his lot with Northumberland, and after Somerset's fall obtained some of his lands in Wiltshire. He was made a Knight of the Garter in 1549, and created Baron Herbert of Cardiff on 10 October 1551, and 1st Earl of Pembroke (of the tenth creation) the following day, by Edward VI.

Herbert's eldest son and heir, Henry, married Lady Katherine Grey at Durham House on 25 May 1553, the same day as her sister, Lady Jane Grey, was married to Northumberland's son Guilford Dudley. The third couple married that day was Northumberland's youngest daughter, Katherine Dudley, to Henry Hastings, 3rd Earl of Huntingdon. After the death of Edward VI, Herbert initially supported Northumberland's attempt to place Jane on the throne. When it became clear that Lady Mary Tudor would take the throne (as Mary I), he cast his daughter-in-law Katherine out of his house and had the marriage annulled. It was at Baynard's Castle that the Privy Council met to end the claim of Lady Jane Grey to the throne and proclaim Mary as Queen of England in 1553. Lady Katherine's father and sister Jane were both executed for high treason in February 1554 by order of Queen Mary I. Herbert managed to distance himself from the Grey family after their fall, and obtained the new Queen's favour by crushing Wyatt's rebellion.

During the Italian War of 1551–1559, Herbert commanded the English army sent to France in support of Spain. His troops did not arrive in time for the Battle of St. Quentin (1557), but played a significant role in the capture of the city afterwards. Pembroke was Mary's most effective commander in the war with France. Mary sometimes suspected Pembroke's loyalty, but he was employed as governor of Calais, as president of Wales and in other ways. He was also to some extent in the confidence of Philip II of Spain. The earl retained his place at court under Elizabeth I until 1569, when he was suspected of favouring the projected marriage between Mary, Queen of Scots, and the Duke of Norfolk.

According to John Aubrey's very colourful Brief Life, he could "neither read nor write" but "had a stamp for his name." Aubrey wrote: "He was of good naturall parts, but very colericque. In Queen Mary's time, upon the return of the Catholique religion, the nunnes came again to Wilton Abbey; and this William, Earl of Pembroke, came to the gate which lookes towards the court by the street, but now is walled up, with his cappe in his hand, and fell upon his knees to the Lady Abbess and nunnes, crying peccavi. Upon Queen Mary's death, the Earl came to Wilton (like a tigre) and turned them out crying, 'Out, ye jades! to worke, to worke—ye jades, goe spinne!'"

Herbert had a secretary, Robert Streynsham, who lived in the parsonage in Ospringe (near Faversham in Kent).

Herbert is reported to have had a close bond with his pet dog. Aubrey wrote that he "had a little cur-dog which loved him, and the earl loved the dog. When the earl died the dog would not go from his master's dead body, but pined away, and died under the hearse." Herbert's dog can be seen in the portrait on the left.

== Arms ==
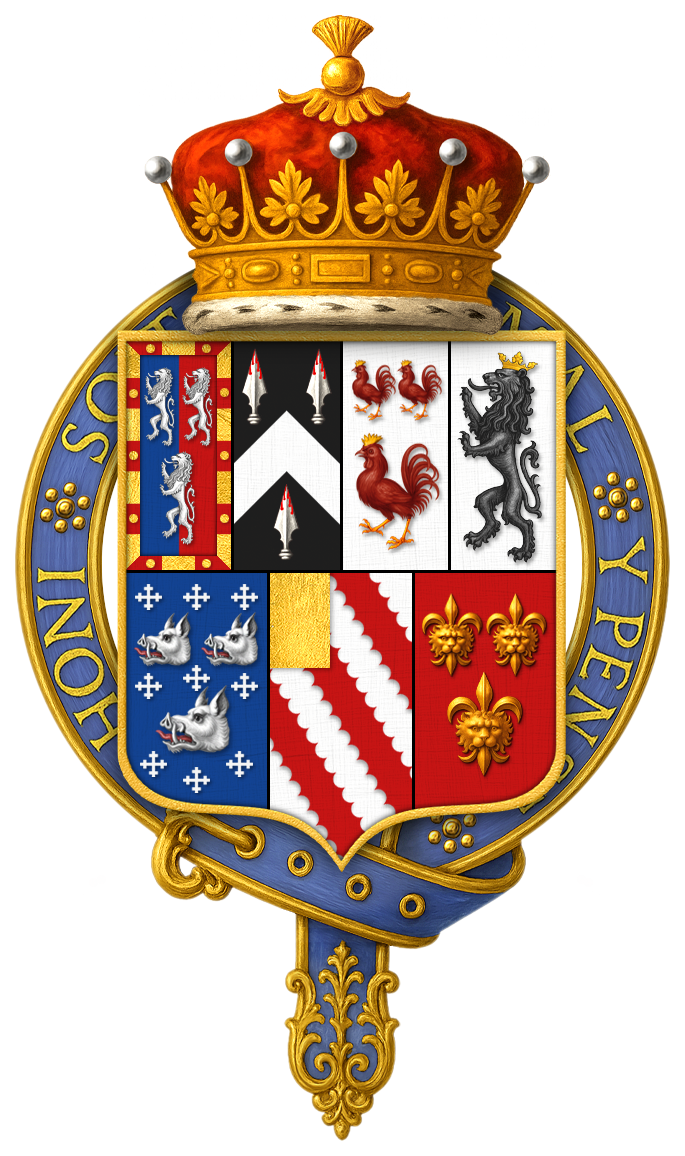
Quartered arms of Sir William Herbert, 1st Earl of Pembroke, KG

- 1: Herbert with difference of a bordure componée gules bezantée and or, for illegitimacy of Sir Richard Herbert of Ewyas (d.1510), father of the 1st Earl);
- 2: Sable, a chevron between three lance heads argent (Bleddin ap Maenarch) (per A.P. Shaw)
- 3: Argent, three cockerels gules (Einion Sais and Gam, a Cradock heiress, per A.P. Shaw, "The Heraldic Stained Glass at Hassop Hall, co. Derby". Part I, published in Journal of the Derbyshire Archeological and Natural History Society; (Derbyshire Archaeological Journal), Volume 31, 1909, pp. 191–220, esp. pp. 203–207, .[1]) (Source:[2]) doi:10.5284/1065609
- 4: Argent, a lion rampant sable crowned or ("Arms of the valiant knight Sir John Morley", per File:Quarterings of 2nd Earl of Pembroke as recorded by York Herald, 1620.jpg, matched with File:Arms of 2nd Earl of Pembroke as recorded by York Herald, 1620.jpg)
- 5: Gules (azure?) semée of cross-crosslets three boar's heads couped argent (Cradock, for his mother Margaret Cradock, heiress of Candleston Castle, Glamorgan; Cradock was heir of Horton))
- 6: Argent, three bends engrailed gules a canton or (Horton of Candleston Castle, Glamorgan, and of Tregwynt, Pembrokeshire, heir of Cantilupe)
- 7: Gules, three leopard's faces jessant-de-lys or (de Cantilupe of Candleston Castle, Glamorgan; as for Cantilupe (modern) feudal barons of Eaton Bray in Bedfordshire)

== Marriages and issue ==
Herbert married twice:

- Firstly to Anne Parr (b. 1515; d. 20 February 1552), the younger sister of Queen Catherine Parr, 6th and last wife of King Henry VIII, by whom he had progeny:
  - Henry Herbert, 2nd Earl of Pembroke (c. 1539-1601), eldest son and heir, who in 1553 married Lady Katherine Grey. The marriage was annulled in 1554 and he married secondly Katherine Talbot, a daughter of George Talbot, 6th Earl of Shrewsbury, in a double wedding with his sister Lady Anne Herbert who married Katherine's brother Francis. Katherine and Francis were children of George Talbot, 6th Earl of Shrewsbury, and his wife Lady Gertrude Manners, daughter of Thomas Manners, 1st Earl of Rutland. His third wife was Mary Sidney, a granddaughter of John Dudley, 1st Duke of Northumberland, by whom he had issue, including William Herbert, 3rd Earl of Pembroke and Philip Herbert, 4th Earl of Pembroke.
  - Sir Edward Herbert (1547–1595), who married Mary Stanley, a daughter of Sir Thomas Stanley, Under-Treasurer of the Mint, by whom he had issue including William Herbert, 1st Baron Powis.
  - Lady Anne Herbert (1550–1592), who in February 1563 married Francis, Lord Talbot, in a double wedding with her brother Henry, at his wedding to Katherine Talbot. Francis was the eldest son and heir apparent of George Talbot, 6th Earl of Shrewsbury, whom he predeceased. There is no known issue from this marriage.
- Secondly he married Anne Talbot, a daughter of George Talbot, 4th Earl of Shrewsbury, and widow of Peter Compton. There was no issue from this marriage.

== Death ==
William died on 17 March 1570, in Hampton Court. He was buried on 18 April 1570 in Old St Paul's Cathedral, where his first wife, Anne (Parr) Herbert, had been buried. His grave and monument were destroyed in the Great Fire of London in 1666. A modern monument in the crypt lists him as one of the important graves lost.

Honorary titles
Preceded by Unknown	Custos Rotulorum of Glamorgan bef. 1544–1570	Succeeded by The Earl of Pembroke
Vacant Title last held by The Earl of Bedford	Lord Lieutenant of Somerset; 1559–1570	Vacant Title next held by The Earl of Pembroke
Preceded by New office	Lord Lieutenant of Wiltshire; 1551–1570	Succeeded by The Earl of Pembroke
Political offices
Preceded by Anthony Browne	Master of the Horse; 1548–1552	Succeeded by The Earl of Warwick
Preceded by The Earl of Arundel	Lord Steward; 1568–1570	Succeeded by The Earl of Leicester
Preceded by The Earl of Warwick	Lord President of Wales and the Marches; 1550–1553	Succeeded by Nicholas Heath
Preceded by Nicholas Heath	Lord President of Wales and the Marches; 1555–1558	Succeeded by Gilbert Bourne
Peerage of England
New title Title granted by Edward VI	Earl of Pembroke; 1551–1570	Succeeded by Henry Herbert
New title Title granted by Edward VI	Baron Herbert of Cardiff; 1551–1570	Succeeded by Henry Herbert
