= Custos Rotulorum of Lancashire =

This is an incomplete list of people who have served as Custos Rotulorum of Lancashire.

- Bartilmew Hesketh c.1535
- Sir John Holcroft 1547–1560
- Sir Richard Molyneux, 1st Baronet by 1598–1623
- Sir Richard Molyneux by 1627–1630
- James Stanley, 7th Earl of Derby by 1636
- Interregnum 1646–1660
- Richard Kirkby 1664–1681
- Caryll Molyneux, 3rd Viscount Molyneux c.1685–1689
- Hon Charles Gerard 1689–1701
- James Stanley, 10th Earl of Derby 1702–1710
- James Hamilton, 4th Duke of Hamilton 1710–1712
- vacant
- James Stanley, 10th Earl of Derby 1714–1736

The office was permanently joined with that of Lord Lieutenant of Lancashire before 1834.
