= Earl of Derby =

Title in the Peerage of England

- Arms of Stanley, Earls of Derby Blazon Arms: Argent, on a bend azure three stags' heads caboshed or. Crest: On a chapeau gules turned up ermine an eagle, wings extended, or, preying on an infant in its cradle proper, swaddled gules, the cradle laced or. Supporters: Dexter, a griffin, wings elevated; sinister, a stag, each or, and ducally collared with line reflexed over the back azure. Motto: Sans changer (Without changing).
- Creation date: 1139 (first creation)
- Created by: Stephen, King of England
- Peerage: Peerage of England
- First holder: Robert de Ferrers, 1st Earl of Derby (first creation)
- Present holder: Edward Stanley, 19th Earl of Derby
- Heir apparent: Edward John Robin Stanley, Lord Stanley
- Subsidiary titles: Baron Stanley of Bickerstaffe; Baron Stanley of Preston
- Seat: Knowsley Hall
- Former seat: Oaks Park
- Motto: Sans changer (Without changing)

Earl of Derby (/ˈdɑːrbi/ DAR-bee) is a title in the Peerage of England. The title was first adopted by Robert de Ferrers, 1st Earl of Derby, under a creation of 1139. It continued with the Ferrers family until the 6th Earl forfeited his property toward the end of the reign of Henry III and died in 1279. Most of the Ferrers property and (by a creation in 1337) the Derby title were then held by the family of Henry III. The title merged in the Crown upon Henry IV's accession to the throne in 1399.

The title was created again, this time for the Stanley family, in 1485. Lord Derby's subsidiary titles are Baron Stanley of Bickerstaffe in the County Palatine of Lancaster (created 1832), and Baron Stanley of Preston in the County Palatine of Lancaster (1886). The courtesy title of the heir apparent is Lord Stanley. The 1st to 5th Earls also held an earlier Barony of Stanley, created for the 1st Earl's father in 1456 and currently abeyant; the 2nd to 5th Earls held the Barony of Strange created in 1299, currently held by the Viscounts St Davids; and the 7th to 9th Earls held another Barony of Strange, created in error in 1628 and currently held independently of other peerages.

Several successive generations of the Stanley Earls, along with other members of the family, have been prominent members of the Conservative Party, and at least one historian has suggested that this family rivals the Cecils (Marquesses of Salisbury) as the single most important family in the party's history. They were at times one of the richest landowning families in England.

The Earls of Derby have given their name to a number of sporting events: the Epsom Derby (usually known simply as the Derby) in horse racing, named for the 12th Earl; the Stanley Cup, the championship trophy of the National Hockey League, presented to the Dominion of Canada in 1892 by the 16th Earl, during his tenure as Governor General of Canada; and the Lord Derby Cup, contested by French rugby league clubs, donated by the 17th Earl, a former British ambassador to Paris. The term "local derby" in sport, referring to a contest between rivals in the same sport with geographically proximate home grounds, may also derive from the family's title and interest in sport.

The family seat is Knowsley Hall, near Liverpool, Merseyside.

== The Ferrers creation ==
Ferrières in Normandy, the hometown of the de Ferrers family, was an important centre for iron (French: fer) and takes its name from the iron ore mines used during the Gallo-Roman period. Lord of Longueville, Normandy, and a Domesday Commissioner; he built Tutbury Castle and Duffield Castle and had large holdings in Derbyshire as well as 17 other counties.

Robert de Ferrers, 1st Earl of Derby (1062–1139) was created Earl of Derby by King Stephen in 1138 for his valiant conduct at the Battle of Northallerton. He was married to Hawise de Vitre and died in 1139.

His son Robert de Ferrers, 2nd Earl of Derby (?–bef. 1160) became the next earl and was married to Margaret Peverel. He founded Darley Abbey and Merevale Abbey.

His son William de Ferrers, 3rd Earl of Derby (died 1190) was married to Sybil de Braose. He rebelled against King Henry II and was imprisoned at Caen, Normandy. He died in the Crusades at the Siege of Acre.

He was succeeded by his son William de Ferrers, 4th Earl of Derby (died 1247) who married Agnes de Kevelioc (also known as Agnes of Chester), daughter of Hugh de Kevelioc, 3rd Earl of Chester.

He was succeeded by his son William de Ferrers, 5th Earl of Derby (died 1254) who married Sibyl Marshall and then Margaret de Quincy with whom he had his son and heir Robert de Ferrers, 6th Earl of Derby (1239–1279), who became the next Earl.

He rebelled against King Henry III and was arrested and imprisoned first in the Tower of London, then in Windsor Castle and Wallingford Castle, and in 1266 his lands and earldom were forfeited, including Tutbury Castle which still belongs to the Duchy of Lancaster. Through one line the descent of the Earls of Derby eventually gave rise to the Earls Ferrers. Laurence Shirley, 4th Earl Ferrers, was the only peer of the realm to be hanged for murder. Another familial line takes in the Baron Ferrers of Chartley descent.

NOTE HOWEVER: This lineage conflicts with Burke (1831) (pp. 192–194)

In that volume he gives the lineage as:

- Robert de Ferrers – created 1st Earl after the Battle of the Standard.
- Robert de Ferrers – 2nd Earl.
- William de Ferrers – 3rd Earl who married Margaret, d. and heiress of William Peverel, of Nottingham.
- Robert de Ferrers – 4th Earl who married Sybilla, daughter of William de Braose. It was Robert who rebelled against Henry II.
- William de Ferrers – 5th Earl who accompanied Richard I on Crusade and died at the siege of Acre.
- William de Ferrers – 6th Earl who was closely associated with William Marshall (Earl of Pembroke); and then his son -
- William de Ferrers – 7th Earl who had livery of Chartley Castle and married the d. of William Marshall with whom he had seven daughters.

== Creation of Henry III ==
The large estates which were taken from Robert in 1266 were given by Henry III to his son, Edmund Crouchback; and his son, Thomas, Earl of Lancaster, also called himself Earl Ferrers. In 1337 Edmund's grandson, Henry of Grosmont (c. 1310 – 1361), afterwards Duke of Lancaster, was created Earl of Derby, and this title was taken by Edward III's son, John of Gaunt, who had married Henry's daughter, Blanche. John of Gaunt's son and successor was Henry Bolingbroke, who acceded to the throne as Henry IV in 1399. The title Earl of Derby then merged in the Crown.

== The Stanley creation ==
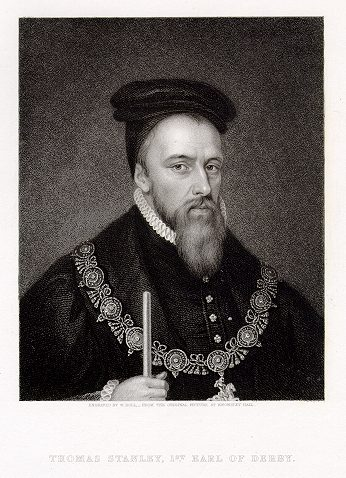
Thomas Stanley, 1st Earl of Derby

The Stanley family was descended from Ligulf of Aldithley, who was also the ancestor of the Audleys (see Audley-Stanley family). One of his descendants married an heiress whose marriage portion included Stoneley, Staffordshire – hence the name Stanley. Sir Thomas Stanley served as Lord Lieutenant of Ireland and represented Lancashire in the House of Commons. In 1456 he was summoned to the House of Lords as Lord Stanley. His eldest son Thomas Stanley, 2nd Baron Stanley, married Lady Margaret Beaufort, the mother of King Henry VII, and also Eleanor Nevill. The title of Earl of Derby was conferred on him in 1485 by his stepson Henry VII after the Battle of Bosworth Field where Thomas sided against King Richard III. The title may derive from the family's extensive lands in the hundred of West Derby, Lancashire, rather than the county or city of Derby.

His eldest son and heir apparent George Stanley, Lord Stanley (commonly called Lord Strange), married Joan Strange, 9th Baroness Strange and 5th Baroness Mohun, and was summoned to the House of Lords as Lord Strange in right of his wife. Lord Derby was succeeded by his grandson Thomas, the eldest son of Lord Strange. He had already succeeded his mother as tenth Baron Strange and sixth Baron Mohun. He married Anne Hastings, daughter of Lord Hungerford and Hastings. The second Earl's son Edward became the 3rd Earl. He notably served as Lord High Steward at the coronation of Queen Mary of England in 1553 and was Lord Lieutenant of Cheshire and Lancashire.

Lord Derby was married four times. His second wife Dorothy Howard, daughter of Thomas Howard, 2nd Duke of Norfolk, supplied his heir Henry, the fourth Earl. He served as Ambassador to France and was one of the peers at the trial of Mary, Queen of Scots, in 1586. Lord Derby married Margaret Clifford, daughter of Henry Clifford, 2nd Earl of Cumberland, and his wife Eleanor, younger daughter of Charles Brandon, 1st Duke of Suffolk, and his wife Mary Tudor, daughter of King Henry VII. Both Lord Derby's sons succeeded to the earldom. The eldest son Ferdinando, the fifth Earl, was summoned to the House of Lords through a writ of acceleration in his father's junior title of Baron Strange in 1589. He also built Leasowe Castle, probably as an observation platform for watching horse races on the nearby sands. Lord Derby married Alice Spencer but was without male issue. He died under mysterious circumstances and some have claimed that he was poisoned to prevent him from staking a claim to the throne of England through his maternal grandmother. On his death, the baronies of Stanley, Strange and Mohun fell into abeyance between his three daughters.

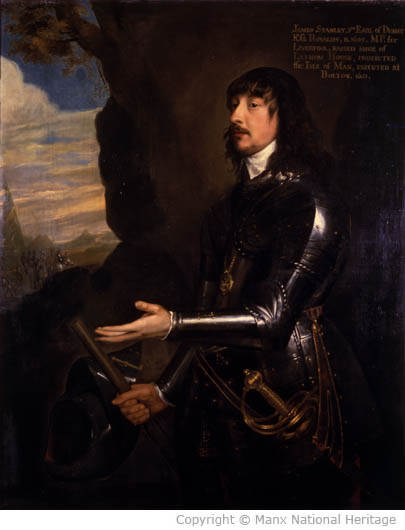
James Stanley, 7th Earl of Derby. Remembered in the Isle of Man as: Yn Stanlagh Mooar (the Great Stanley).

He was succeeded in the earldom by his younger brother William, the sixth Earl. He was Lord Lieutenant of Lancashire and Cheshire and purchased from his nieces their claims in the Isle of Man. William married Elizabeth de Vere daughter of Edward de Vere, 17th Earl of Oxford. Their son James succeeded to the earldom on his father's death. In 1628, during his father's lifetime, he was summoned to the House of Lords through a writ of acceleration as Lord Strange, as it was believed that his father held this title. When it was discovered that this was a mistake, the House of Lords decided that there were two baronies of Strange, the original 1299 creation and the new, 1628 creation. James was a staunch Royalist. In 1643 he moved to the Isle of Man and established it as a Royalist stronghold. He was beheaded in Bolton, Lancashire by the Parliament forces in 1651. His wife was Charlotte de la Trémouille, daughter of Claude de la Trémoille, Duc de Thouars, who is known as the heroine who defended Lathom House in 1644 and the Isle of Man in 1651.

Their son Charles became the 8th Earl. He served as Lord Lieutenant of both Cheshire and Lancashire. Lord Derby married Dorothea Helena Kirkhoven, daughter of Jehan Kirkhoven, Lord of Heenvliet (in South Holland) and Baron de Rupa of the Netherlands. They had two sons who both succeeded to the earldom. The 8th Earl's eldest son William Richard George became the 9th Earl. He was also Lord Lieutenant of Cheshire and Lancashire. He married Elizabeth Butler, daughter of Thomas Butler, Earl of Ossory, and sister of James Butler, 2nd Duke of Ormonde. He had two daughters and one son. He outlived his son and on his death in 1702, the barony of Strange fell into abeyance between his daughters. He was succeeded in the earldom by his younger brother, James, the tenth Earl. He was a politician and served as Chancellor of the Duchy of Lancaster and as Captain of the Yeomen of the Guard. Like many of his predecessors, he was also Lord Lieutenant of Cheshire and Lancashire. In 1732 he succeeded his great-niece as 6th Baron Strange. Lord Derby was childless and on his death in 1736, the male line of the second Earl died out. He was succeeded in the barony of Strange, which could be passed on through female lines, by his first cousin once removed, James Murray, 2nd Duke of Atholl.

The earldom was inherited by his distant relative Sir Edward Stanley, 5th Baronet, of Bickerstaffe, a descendant of a younger brother of the second Earl, who became the 11th Earl of Derby (see below for earlier history of the baronetcy). He had previously represented Lancashire in Parliament and after he succeeded in the earldom he served as Lord Lieutenant of Lancashire. Lord Derby married Elizabeth Hesketh. His residence was Bickerstaffe Hall near Ormskirk, Lancashire. The 11th Earl's younger brother was the Hon. and Rev. John Stanley, Rector of Bury Parish Church 1743–1778. Edward's eldest son, James, Lord Stanley, was commonly called Lord Strange. Edward outlived James (who died in 1771) and was succeeded by James' son Edward, the 12th Earl. He held political office as Chancellor of the Duchy of Lancaster and also founded The Derby horse-race. Lord Derby married Lady Elizabeth Hamilton, daughter of James Hamilton, 6th Duke of Hamilton. His second marriage was to a Drury Lane actress, Elizabeth Farren.

The 12th Earl's first marriage produced his heir Edward, the thirteenth Earl. He represented Preston and Lancashire in the House of Commons and in 1832, two years before he succeeded his father, he was raised to the peerage in his own right as Baron Stanley, of Bickerstaffe in the County Palatine of Lancaster. Lord Derby was also a natural historian and his zoological collections were founded Liverpool Museum. He was also a patron of the arts, especially of the poet Edward Lear who wrote The Owl and the Pussycat for the Earl's children. He was married to Charlotte Hornby. In 1844, he had a church built on the Knowsley Estate, St. Mary the Virgin, where several Stanleys found their final resting place.

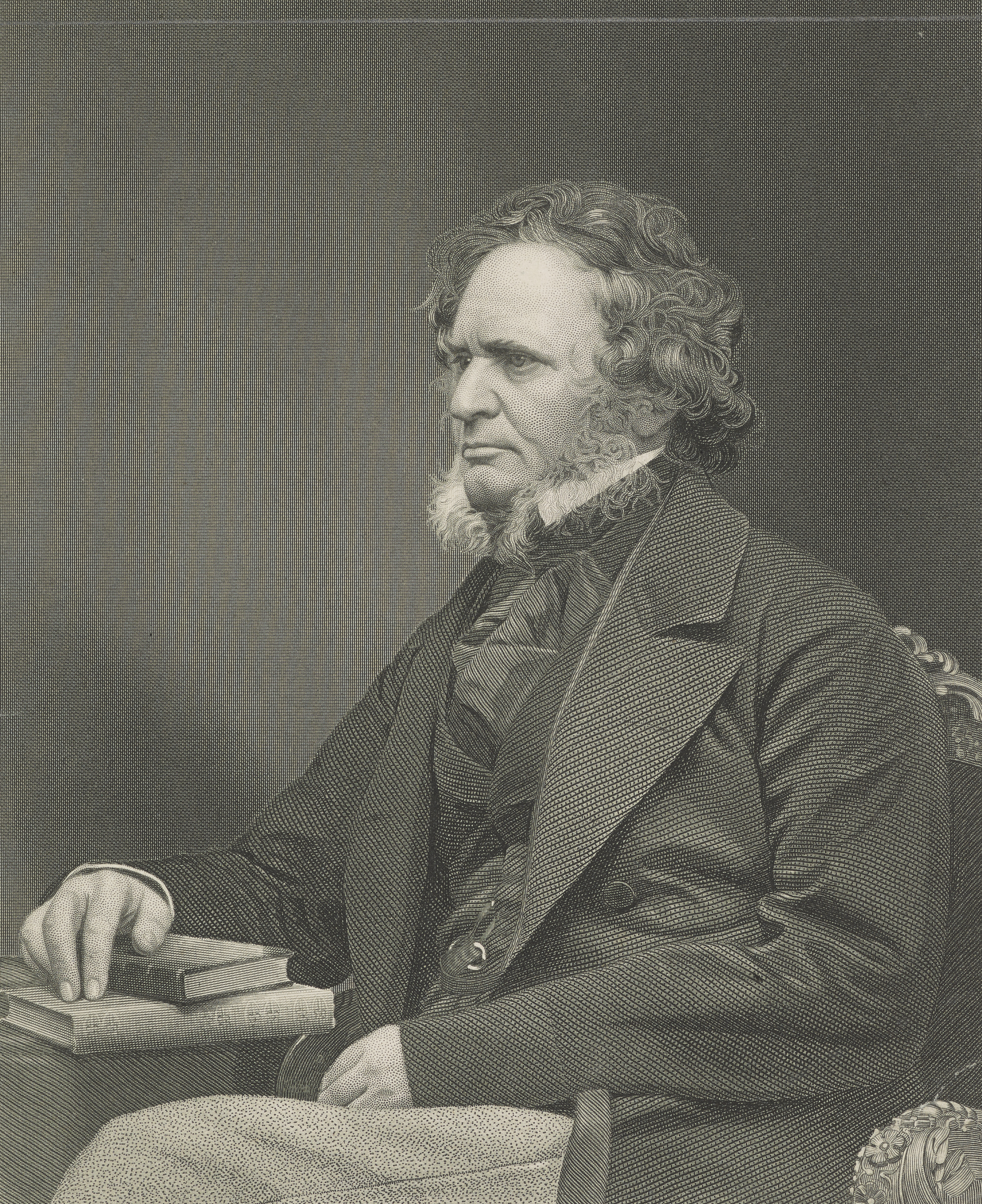
Edward Smith-Stanley, 14th Earl of Derby

His son, Edward, succeeded him to become the 14th Earl. He is the most famous of the Earls of Derby. Known as a great parliamentary orator, he sat as Member of Parliament for Stockbridge, a seat bought by his father, Windsor and Lancashire North. In 1844 he was summoned to the House of Lords through a writ of acceleration in his father's junior title of Baron Stanley. Although at first a Whig, he later became a Tory and served three times Prime Minister of the United Kingdom. Lord Derby was married to Emma Wilbraham, daughter of Edward Bootle-Wilbraham, 1st Baron Skelmersdale. They had a daughter and two sons, both of whom succeeded to the earldom. The eldest son Edward Henry, was a prominent politician and served under his father as Parliamentary Under-Secretary of State for Foreign Affairs and Foreign Secretary. He became Foreign Secretary again under Benjamin Disraeli. In 1880 he joined the Liberal Party and was Colonial Secretary under William Gladstone between 1882 and 1885.

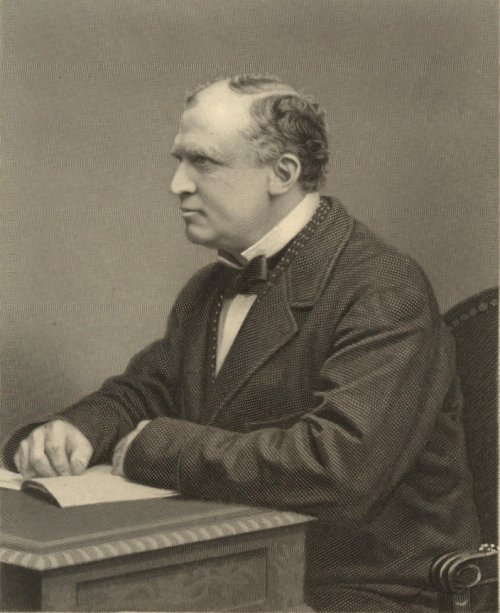
Edward Henry Stanley, 15th Earl of Derby

His younger brother and successor, Frederick Arthur Stanley, 16th Earl of Derby, was a Conservative politician and held office as Secretary of State for War, as Colonial Secretary and as President of the Board of Trade. In 1886, seven years before succeeding his brother, he was raised to the peerage in his own right as Baron Stanley of Preston, in the County Palatine of Lancaster. He was also Governor General of Canada between 1888 and 1893. In 1892, he purchased and donated the Stanley Cup, to be awarded to the "championship hockey club of the Dominion of Canada" each year; it eventually became the trophy for the championship of the National Hockey League. Lord Derby was married to Lady Constance Villiers, daughter of George William Villiers, 4th Earl of Clarendon.

He was succeeded by his son Edward, the seventeenth Earl. Like many of his ancestors he was a politician and notably served as Secretary of State for War. He was also Ambassador to France, and during this time followed his father's lead by donating the Lord Derby Cup, given each year to the winners of the French rugby league knockout competition. Lord Derby married Alice Montagu daughter of William Montagu, 7th Duke of Manchester. A pair of Memorial Gates were erected in 1958 on Knowsley Lane on the Knowsley Estate in his memory. His two sons, Edward Stanley, Lord Stanley, and the Hon. Oliver Stanley both became Conservative politicians and served together in the same cabinet in 1938. Lord Derby outlived his eldest son and was succeeded by his grandson John, the eldest son of Lord Stanley, who became the 18th Earl. He was Lord Lieutenant of Lancashire and also established Knowsley Safari Park in 1971. He married Isabel Miles-Lade but died childless. As of 2017 the titles are held by his nephew Edward Richard William Stanley, 19th Earl of Derby. He is the son of Hugh Henry Montagu Stanley, younger brother of the 18th Earl.

The Stanley baronetcy, of Bickerstaffe in the County Palatine of Lancaster, was created in the Baronetage of England in 1627 for Edward Stanley. He was the great-grandson of the Hon. Sir James Stanley, of Cross Hall, Lathom, younger brother of the second Earl of Derby. This branch of the family is known as the "Stanleys of Bickerstaffe". Sir Edward Stanley's great-grandson, the fourth Baronet, represented Preston in Parliament. His son, the aforementioned fifth Baronet, succeeded as eleventh Earl of Derby in 1736. For further history of the baronetcy, see above.

James Stanley, son of the first Earl, became Bishop of Ely in 1506. He sent a small army into the Battle of Flodden, commanded by his alleged son Sir John Stanley who later entered the monastery of Westminster Abbey.

Edward Stanley, a descendant of Peter Stanley, younger son of the second Baronet, sat as Member of Parliament for Somerset West and Bridgwater.

The Earl of Derby owns Knowsley Hall and Greenhalgh Castle; they were the Lords of Mann, i.e. of the Isle of Man from 1405 until 1594.

Several Earls of Derby are buried in St. Mary's Church, Knowsley. Others are buried in the Derby Chapel at Ormskirk Parish Church.

The Barons Stanley of Alderley are members of another branch of the Stanley family. They are descended from the Hon. Sir John Stanley, third son of the first Baron Stanley. Also, Edward Stanley, 1st Baron Monteagle, was the younger son of the first Earl of Derby.

A boarding house of Wellington College was named 'Stanley' in honour of the 14th Earl. During his time at Wellington, the 17th Earl was a pupil of this house.

== Earl of Derby, first creation (1138) ==
- Robert de Ferrers, 1st Earl of Derby (died 1139)
- Robert de Ferrers, 2nd Earl of Derby (died 1162)
- William de Ferrers, 3rd Earl of Derby (died 1190)
- William de Ferrers, 4th Earl of Derby (died 1247)
- William de Ferrers, 5th Earl of Derby (died 1254)
- Robert de Ferrers, 6th Earl of Derby (1239–1266)
- Edmund "Crouchback", Earl of Derby (1266–1296)

== Earl of Derby, second creation (1337) ==
- Henry of Grosmont, 1st Earl of Derby (c. 1310–1361); also Duke of Lancaster (1351) and Earl of Leicester (1345)
- John of Gaunt, 2nd Earl of Derby (1340–1399)
- Henry (of) Bolingbroke, 3rd Earl of Derby (1367–1413; became King Henry IV in 1399)

Earldom of Derby merged in the crown in 1399.

== Earl of Derby, third creation ==
=== Baron Stanley (1456) ===
- Thomas Stanley, 1st Baron Stanley (1405–1459)
- Thomas Stanley, 2nd Baron Stanley (c. 1435 – 1504; created Earl of Derby in 1485)

=== Earl of Derby (1485) ===
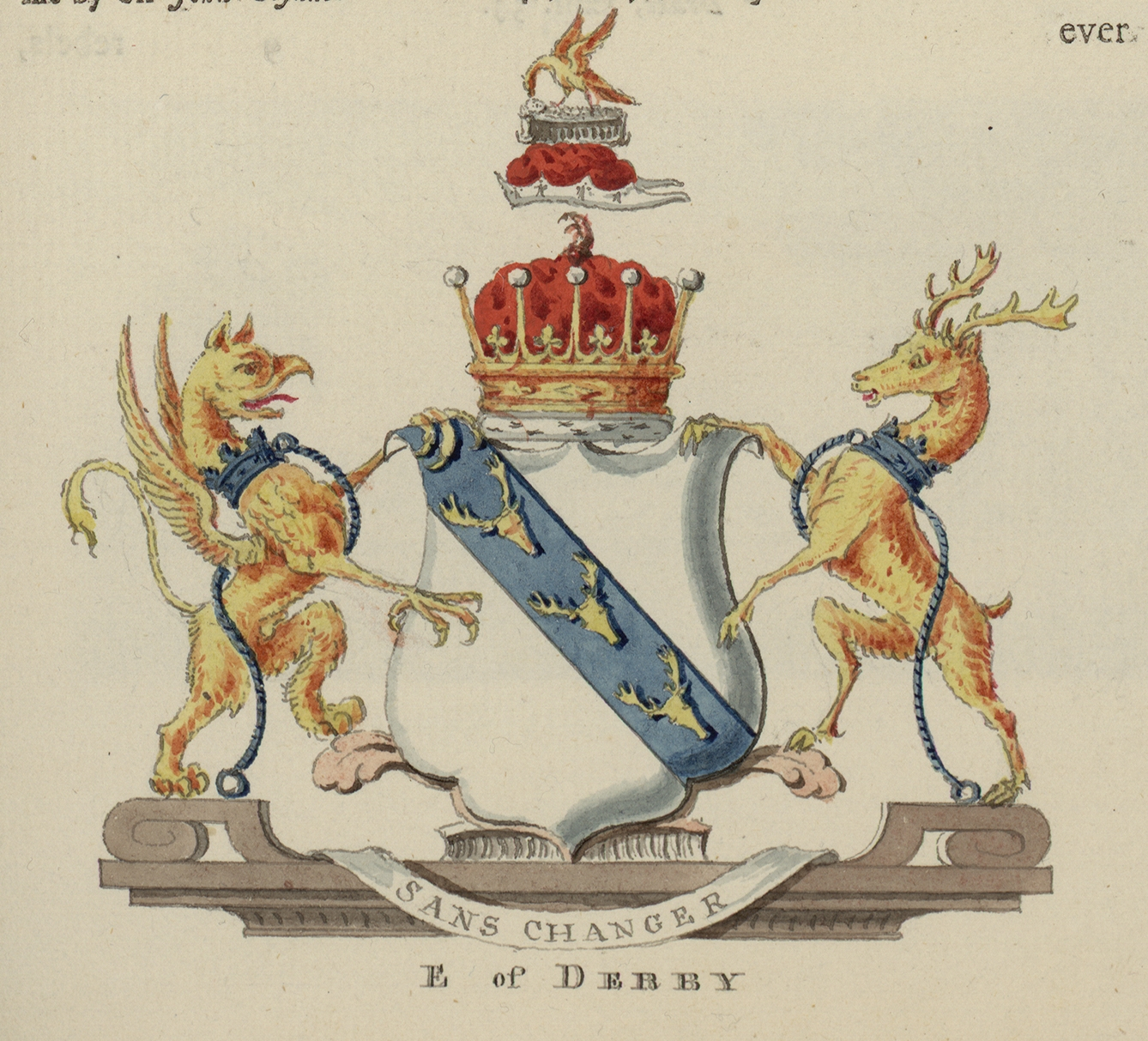
Armorial achievement of the Earls of Derby of the Stanley family, 1781

- Thomas Stanley, 1st Earl of Derby (c. 1435–1504)
- Thomas Stanley, 2nd Earl of Derby (1477–1521)
- Edward Stanley, 3rd Earl of Derby (c. 1508 – 1572)
- Henry Stanley, 4th Earl of Derby (1531–1593)
- Ferdinando Stanley, 5th Earl of Derby (1559–1594)
- William Stanley, 6th Earl of Derby (bef. 1584–1642)
- James Stanley, 7th Earl of Derby (1607–1651)
- Charles Stanley, 8th Earl of Derby (1628–1672)
- William Richard George Stanley, 9th Earl of Derby (1655–1702)
- James Stanley, 10th Earl of Derby (1664–1736)
- Edward Stanley, 11th Earl of Derby (1689–1776)
- Edward Smith-Stanley, 12th Earl of Derby (1752–1834)
- Edward Smith-Stanley, 13th Earl of Derby (1775–1851)
- Edward Geoffrey Smith-Stanley, 14th Earl of Derby (1799–1869)
- Edward Henry Stanley, 15th Earl of Derby (1826–1893)
- Frederick Arthur Stanley, 16th Earl of Derby (1841–1908)
- Edward George Villiers Stanley, 17th Earl of Derby (1865–1948)
- Edward John Stanley, 18th Earl of Derby (1918–1994)
- Edward Richard William Stanley, 19th Earl of Derby (born 1962)

The heir apparent is the present holder's son, Edward John Robin Stanley, Lord Stanley (born 1998).

=== Stanley baronets, of Bickerstaffe (1627) ===
- Sir Edward Stanley, 1st Baronet (died 1640; great-great-grandson of 1st Earl of Derby)
- Sir Thomas Stanley, 2nd Baronet (1616–1653)
- Sir Edward Stanley, 3rd Baronet (1643–1671)
- Sir Thomas Stanley, 4th Baronet (1670–1714)
- Sir Edward Stanley, 5th Baronet (1689–1776; succeeded as 11th Earl of Derby in 1736)

For further Baronets, see above

=== Baron Stanley of Preston (1886) ===
- Frederick Arthur Stanley, 1st Baron Stanley of Preston (1841–1908; succeeded his brother as 16th Earl of Derby in 1893)

For further Barons, see above

=== Line of succession ===
Line of succession (simplified)
- Thomas Stanley, 1st Earl of Derby (c. 1435–1504)
  - Thomas Stanley, 2nd Earl of Derby (1477–1521)
    - Edward Stanley, 3rd Earl of Derby (1509–1572)
      - Henry Stanley, 4th Earl of Derby (1531–1593)
        - Ferdinando Stanley, 5th Earl of Derby (1559–1594)
        - William Stanley, 6th Earl of Derby (1561–1642)
          - James Stanley, 7th Earl of Derby (1607–1651)
            - Charles Stanley, 8th Earl of Derby (1628–1672)
              - William Stanley, 9th Earl of Derby (c. 1655–1702)
              - James Stanley, 10th Earl of Derby (1664–1736)
  - George Stanley, 9th Baron Strange (c. 1460–1503)
    - Sir James Stanley (1486–1562)
      - Henry Stanley (1515–1598)
        - Sir Edward Stanley, 1st Baronet, of Bickerstaffe (died 1640)
          - Sir Thomas Stanley, 2nd Baronet (1616–1653)
            - Sir Edward Stanley, 3rd Baronet (1643–1671)
              - Sir Thomas Stanley, 4th Baronet (1670–1714)
                - Edward Stanley, 11th Earl of Derby (1689–1776)
                  - James Smith-Stanley, Lord Strange (1716–1771)
                    - Edward Smith-Stanley, 12th Earl of Derby (1752–1834)
                      - Edward Smith-Stanley, 13th Earl of Derby (1775–1851)
                        - Edward Smith-Stanley, 14th Earl of Derby (1799–1869)
                          - Edward Henry Stanley, 15th Earl of Derby (1826–1893)
                          - Frederick Stanley, 16th Earl of Derby (1841–1908)
                            - Edward Stanley, 17th Earl of Derby (1865–1948)
                              - Edward Montagu Cavendish Stanley, Lord Stanley (1894–1938)
                                - (Edward) John Stanley, 18th Earl of Derby (1918–1994)
                                - Hon. Hugh Henry Stanley (1926–1971)
                                  - Edward Stanley, 19th Earl of Derby (b. 1962)
                                    - (1). Edward John Robin Stanley, Lord Stanley (b. 1998)
                                    - (2). Hon. Oliver Hugh Henry Stanley (b. 2002)
                                  - (3). Hon. Peter Hugh Charles Stanley (b. 1964)
                                    - (4). Richard Hugh Edward Stanley (b. 1993)
                                      - (5). William Otto David Stanley (b. 2025)
                                    - (6). Algernon Edmund Stanley (b. 1999)
                              - Rt. Hon. Oliver Frederick George Stanley (1896–1950)
                                - Michael Charles Stanley (1921–1990)
                                  - male issue and descendants in remainder
                            - Hon. Ferdinand Charles Stanley (1871–1935)
                              - Frederick Arthur Stanley (1905–1978)
                                - male issue and descendants in remainder
                            - Hon. Frederick William Stanley (1878–1942)
                              - David William Stanley (1906–1997)
                                - male issue and descendants in remainder
                        - Hon. Henry Thomas Smith-Stanley (1803–1875)
                          - Charles Geoffrey Stanley (1839–1877)
                            - Charles Henry Stanley (1863–19?)
                              - Charles Geoffrey Nason Stanley (1884–1977)
                                - Eric William Stanley (1922–1998)
                                  - male issue and descendants in remainder
                                - Arthur Patrick Stanley (b. 1932)
                                  - male issue and descendants in remainder
                              - Henry William Stanley (1903–1977)
                                - Leslie Hugh Stanley (1931–2006)
                                  - male issue and descendants in remainder
                                - Norman Edward Stanley (b. 1937)
                                  - male issue and descendants in remainder
                        - Hon. Charles James Fox Stanley (1808–1884)
                          - Charles Edward Henry Stanley (1843–1909)
                            - Charles Douglas Stanley (1878–1975)
                              - Charles John Geoffrey Stanley (1918–2018)
                                - male issue and descendants in remainder
            - Peter Stanley (d. 1686)
              - Thomas Stanley (d. 1733)
                - Thomas Stanley (1717–1764)
                  - James Stanley (1750–1810)
                    - Edward Stanley (1789–1870)
                      - Edward James Stanley (1826–1907)
                        - Edward Arthur Vesey Stanley (1879–1941)
                          - male issue and descendants in remainder

There are further heirs to the barony of Stanley descended from the younger brothers of the first earl.

=== Family tree of the earls of Derby (third creation) ===
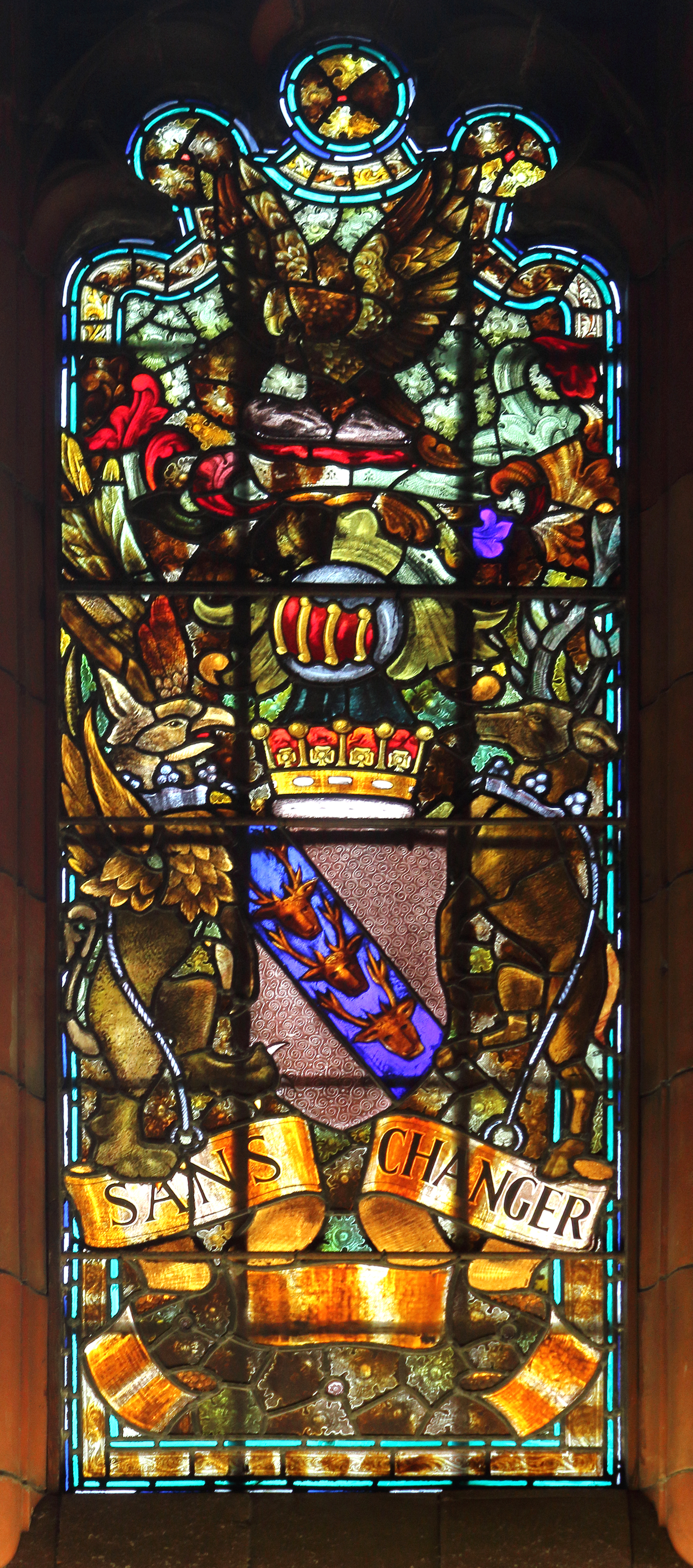
Arms of the Earl of Derby in the Victoria Building, University of Liverpool.

Thomas STANLEY c. 1405–1459
Thomas; 1435–1504
George; 1460–1503
Thomas; 1477–1521	James; 1486–1562
Edward c. 1508–1572	Henry; 1515–1598
Henry; 1531–1593	Edward d. c. 1640
Ferdinando; 1559–1594	William; 1584–1642	Thomas; 1616–1653
James; 1607–1651	Edward; 1643–1671
Charles; 1628–1672	Thomas; 1670–1714
William c. 1655–1702	James; 1664–1736	Edward; 1689–1776
James SMITH-STANLEY; 1716–1771
Edward; 1752–1834
Edward; 1775–1851
Edward; 1799–1869
Edward STANLEY; 1826–1893	Frederick STANLEY; 1841–1908
Edward; 1865–1948
Edward; 1894–1938
John; 1918–1994	Hugh; 1926–1971
Edward; 1962
Edward; 1998

Family tree of Dukes, Marquesses, and Earls of Atholl, Earls of Derby (3rd Stanley family creation), and Earls of Dunmore

John Lestrange III d. 1269
Baron Strange (1st creation), of Salop, 1295
John Lestrange IV d. 1276	Roger le Strange d. 1311; 1st Baron Strange of Salop
Baron Strange (1st creation), of Salop extinct, 1311
Baron Strange (2nd creation), of Knockyn, 1295
John Le Strange V d. 1309; 1st Baron Strange of Knockyn
Baron Mohun of Dunster, 1299
John Le Strange VI c. 1282–1311; 2nd Baron Strange of Knockyn	John de Mohun d. 1330; 1st Baron Mohun
John Le Strange c. 1297–1323; 3rd Baron Strange of Knockyn	Roger Le Strange; 1301–1349; 4th Baron Strange of Knockyn	John de Mohun d. 1322
Earl of Atholl (4th creation), 1367
Roger Le Strange c. 1327–1382; 5th Baron Strange of Knockyn	John Mohun; 1320–1376; 2nd Baron Mohun	Robert Stewart; 1316–1390; 1st Earl of Atholl, Earl of Strathearn, Later King Robert II
Earl of Atholl (6th creation), 1403	Earl of Atholl (7th creation), 1404
John Beaufort c. 1373–1410; Earl of Somerset	John Le Strange c. 1350–1397; 6th Baron Strange of Knockyn	Maud Mohun	John Stewart c. 1337–1406; 2nd Earl of Atholl, Earl of Carrick, Later King Robert III	Robert Stewart; 1340–1420; Duke of Albany, Earl of Atholl	Walter Stewart c. 1360–1437; Earl of Atholl, Earl of Strathearn, Earl of Caithness
Earldom of Atholl (4th creation) merged in the crown, 1390	Earldom of Atholl (6th creation) expired, 1406	Earldom of Atholl (7th creation) attainted, 1404
Baron Stanley, 1456	Earl of Atholl (5th creation), 1398
John Beaufort; 1401–1444; Duke of Somerset	Thomas Stanley c. 1405–1459; 1st Baron Stanley, King of Mann	Richard Le Strange; 1381–1449; 7th Baron Strange of Knockyn, 3rd Baron Mohun	James Stewart "Black Knight of Lorn"; 1399–c. 1451	Joan Beaufort c. 1404–1445	James I 1394–1437; King of Scots	David Stewart; 1378–1402; Duke of Rothesay, Earl of Atholl, Earl of Carrick
Earldom of Atholl (5th creation) extinct, 1402
Earl of Derby (3rd creation), 1485	Earl of Atholl (8th creation), c. 1457; Lord of Balveny, 1460
Margaret Beaufort; 1443–1509	Thomas Stanley; 1435–1504; 1st Earl of Derby, 2nd Baron Stanley, King of Mann	John Le Strange c. 1440–1477; 8th Baron Strange of Knockyn	John Stewart c. 1437–1442–1512; 1st Earl of Atholl
Henry VII; 1457–1509	George Stanley; 1460–1503; 9th Baron Strange of Knockyn suo uxoris	Joan Le Strange c. 1460–1514; 9th Baroness Strange of Knockyn suo jure	John Stewart c. 1480–c. 1521; 2nd Earl of Atholl
Mary Tudor; 1496–1533	Thomas Stanley; 1504–1521; 2nd Earl of Derby, 10th Baron Strange of Knockyn, 3rd Baron Stanley, King of Mann	John Stewart; 1507–1542; 3rd Earl of Atholl
Eleanor Brandon; 1519–1547	Edward Stanley c. 1509–1572; 3rd Earl of Derby, 11th Baron Strange of Knockyn, 4th Baron Stanley, Lord of Mann	John Stewart "the fair" d. 1579; 4th Earl of Atholl
Earl of Atholl (9th creation), 1596	Lord Murray of Tullibardine, 1604, Earl of Tullibardine (1st creation) and Lord Murray, Gask and Balquhidder, 1606
Margaret Clifford; 1540–1596	Henry Stanley; 1531–1593; 4th Earl of Derby, 12th Baron Strange of Knockyn, 5th Baron Stanley, Lord of Mann	John Stewart; 1566–1603; 1st Earl of Atholl, 6th Lord Innermeath	Marie Ruthven (d. after 1605)	John Stewart; 1563–1595; 5th Earl of Atholl	John Murray (c. 1550 – c. 1609); 1st Earl of Tullibardine, etc.
Earldom of Atholl (8th creation) extinct, 1595
Earl of Tullibardine (2nd creation), 1628
Ferdinando Stanley; 1559–1594; 5th Earl of Derby, 13th Baron Strange of Knockyn, 6th Baron Stanley, Lord of Mann	William Stanley; 1561–1642; 6th Earl of Derby, Lord of Mann	James Stewart d. 1625; 2nd Earl of Atholl	Dorothea Stewart	William Murray c. 1574–1627; 2nd Earl of Tullibardine, etc.	Patrick Murray; 1578–1644; 1st Earl of Tullibardine, etc.
Barony of Strange of Knockyn (9th creation) abeyant, 1594	Earldom of Atholl (9th creation) extinct, 1625	Resigned Earldom of Tullibardine and lordships in favour of his brother, 1626
Elizabeth Stanley; 1588–1633
Baron Strange (4th creation), 1628	Earl of Atholl (10th creation), 1629
Ferdinando Hastings; 1608–1655; 6th Earl of Huntingdon and Baron Hastings	James Stanley; 1607–1651; 7th Earl of Derby, 1st Baron Strange (4th creation)	John Murray c. 1610–1642; 1st Earl of Atholl	James Murray; 1617–1670; 2nd Earl of Tullibardine, etc.
Marquess of Atholl, Viscount of Balquhidder, and Lord Murray, Balveny and Gask, 1676
Charles Stanley; 1628–1672; 8th Earl of Derby, 2nd Baron Strange (4th creation)	Amelia Ann Sophia Stanley; 1633–1702/03	John Murray; 1631–1703; 1st Marquess of Atholl, etc., 2nd Earl of Atholl, 3rd Earl of Tullibardine, etc.
Earl of Tullibardine, Viscount Glenalmond and Lord Murray, 1696 (for life); Duke of Atholl, Marquess of Tullibardine, Earl of Strathtay and Strathardle, Viscount of Balwhidder, Glenalmond and Glenlyon, Lord Murray, Balveny and Gask, 1703	Earl of Dunmore, Viscount of Fincastle, Lord Murray of Blair, Moulin and Tillimet, 1686
Theophilus Hastings; 1650–1701; 7th Earl of Huntingdon and Baron Hastings	William Richard George Stanley c. 1655–1702; 9th Earl of Derby, 3rd Baron Strange (4th creation)	James Stanley; 1664–1736; 10th Earl of Derby, 6th Baron Strange (4th creation)	John Murray; 1660–1724; 1st Duke of Atholl, etc., 2nd Marquess of Atholl, etc., Earl of Tullibardine and Viscount Glenalmond and Lord Murray	Charles Murray; 1661–1710; 1st Earl of Dunmore, etc.
Theophilus Hastings; 1696–1747; 9th Earl of Huntingdon and Baron Hastings	Henrietta Stanley; 1687–1718; 4th Baroness Strange (4th creation)	William Murray; 1689–1746 styled Marquess of Tullibardine	James Murray; 1690–1764; 2nd Duke of Atholl, etc., 7th Baron Strange (4th creation)	George Murray; 1694–1760	John Murray; 1685–1752; 2nd Earl of Dunmore, etc.	William Murray; 1696–1756; 3rd Earl of Dunmore, etc.
Attainted and excluded from succession	Attainted and excluded from succession
Elizabeth Rawdon; 1731–1808; 16th Baroness Botreaux, 15th Baroness Hungerford, 13th Baroness de Moleyns, 13th Baroness Hastings	John Rawdon; 1720–1793; 1st Earl of Moira, 2nd Baron Rawdon, 4th Rawdon Baronet	Henrietta Ashburnham c. 1716–1732; 5th Baroness Strange (4th creation)	Charlotte Murray; 1731–1805; 8th Baroness Strange (4th creation)	John Murray; 1729–1774; 3rd Duke of Atholl	John Murray; 1730–1809; 4th Earl of Dunmore, etc.
Earl Strange and Baron Murray of Stanley, 1786	Baron Dunmore, 1831
Francis Rawdon-Hastings; 1754–1826; 1st Marquess of Hastings, 2nd Earl of Moira, 3rd Baron Rawdon, 5th Rawdon Baronet	Flora Mure-Campbell; 1780–1840; 6th Countess of Loudoun	John Murray; 1755–1830; 4th Duke of Atholl, etc., 1st Earl Strange, etc., 9th Baron Strange (4th creation)	George Murray; 1761–1803	George Murray; 1762–1836; 5th Earl of Dunmore, etc., 1st Baron Dunmore	Alexander Murray; 1764–1842
Baron Glenlyon
George Augustus Francis Rawdon-Hastings; 1808–1844; 2nd Marquess of Hastings; 3rd Earl of Moira; Earl of Rawdon, 4th Baron Rawdon	Barbara Rawdon-Hastings; 1810–1858; 20th Baroness Grey de Ruthyn	Charlotte Murray; 1775–1832 m. Adam Drummond of Megginch	John Murray; 1778–1846; 5th Duke of Atholl, etc., 2nd Earl Strange, etc., 10th Baron Strange (4th creation)	James Murray; 1782–1837; 1st Baron Glenlyon	George Murray; 1784–1860
Edith Maud Rawdon-Hastings; 1833–1874; 10th Countess of Loudoun	John Drummond; 1803–1889	George Augustus Frederick John Murray; 1814–1864; 6th Duke of Atholl, etc., 3rd Earl Strange, etc., 11th Baron Strange (4th creation), 2nd Baron Glenlyon	George Edward Murray; 1818–1854	Alexander Edward Murray; 1804–1845; 6th Earl of Dunmore, etc., 2nd Baron Dunmore	Virginius Murray; 1817–1861
Paulyn Francis Cuthbert Rawdon-Hastings; 1856–1907	Malcolm Drummond; 1856–1924	John James Hugh Henry Stewart-Murray; 1840–1917; 7th Duke of Atholl, etc., 4th Earl Strange, etc., 12th Baron Strange (4th creation), 3rd Baron Glenlyon	George Herbert Murray; 1849–1936	Douglas Stuart Murray; 1853–1920	Charles Adolphus Murray; 1841–1907; 7th Earl of Dunmore, etc., 3rd Baron Dunmore	Reginald Murray; 1846–1925
Baron Stanley abeyance ended, 1921	Baron Strange of Knockyn abeyance ended, 1921
Edith Abney-Hastings; 1883–1960; 12th Countess of Loudoun; Baroness Botreaux, Baroness Hastings, 7th Baroness Stanley	Elizabeth Philipps Abney-Hastings; 1884–1974; 22nd Baroness Hungerford, 20th Baroness de Moleyns, 14th Baroness Strange of Knockyn	John George Stewart-Murray; 1871–1942; 8th Duke of Atholl, etc., 5th Earl Strange, etc., 13th Baron Strange (4th creation), 4th Baron Glenlyon	James Thomas Stewart-Murray; 1879–1957; 9th Duke of Atholl, etc., 6th Earl Strange, etc., 14th Baron Strange (4th creation), 5th Baron Glenlyon	George Evelyn Pemberton Murray; 1880–1947	George Murray; 1884–1940	Alexander Edward Murray; 1871–1962; 8th Earl of Dunmore, etc., 4th Baron Dunmore	Arthur Charles Murray; 1882–1964
Earldom of Strange and Baronies of Murray and Glenlyon extinct and Barony of Strange abeyant, 1957
Baron Strange (4th creation) abeyance terminated, 1965
Jestyn Reginald Austin Plantagenet Philipps; 1917–1991; 2nd Viscount St Davids, 23rd Baron Hungerford, 21st Baron de Moleyns, 15th Baron Strange of Knockyn	John Drummond; 1900–1982; 15th Baron Strange (4th creation)	George Anthony Murray; 1907–1945	Edward David Murray; 1908–1940 styled Viscount Fincastle	Reginald Arthur Murray; 1911–1981; 10th Earl of Dunmore, etc.	Kenneth Randolph Murray; 1913–1995; 11th Earl of Dunmore, etc.
Baron Strange (4th creation) abeyant, 1982–1986
Colwyn Iestyn John Philipps; 1939–2009; 3rd Viscount St Davids, 24th Baron Hungerford, 22nd Baron de Moleyns, 16th Baron Strange of Knockyn	Jean Cherry Drummond; 1928–2008; 16th Baroness Strange (4th creation)	George Iain Murray; 1931–1996; 10th Duke of Atholl, etc.	John Murray; 1929–2012; 11th Duke of Atholl, etc.	John Alexander Murray; 1939–1980; 9th Earl of Dunmore, etc., 5th Baron Dunmore
Barony Dunmore extinct, 1980
Rhodri Colwyn Philipps b. 1966; 4th Viscount St Davids, 25th Baron Hungerford, 23rd Baron de Moleyns, 17th Baron Strange of Knockyn	Roland Augusto Jestyn Estanislao Philipps b. 1970	Adam Humphrey Drummond b. 1953; 17th Baron Strange (4th creation)	Bruce George Ronald Murray b. 1960; 12th Duke of Atholl, etc.	Malcolm Kenneth Murray b. 1946; 12th Earl of Dunmore, etc.	Geoffrey Charles Murray b. 1949
Heir presumptive to the Viscouncy St Davids, Barony Hungerford, Barony de Moleyns, and Barony of Strange of Knockyn	Heir presumptive to the Earldom of Dunmore
John Adam Humphrey Drummond b. 1992	Michael Bruce John Murray b. 1985 styled Marquess of Tullibardine	David Nicholas George Murray b. 1986
Heir apparent to the Barony of Strange (4th creation)	Heir apparent to the Dukedom of Atholl

== See also ==
- Baron Mohun
- Edward Stanley, Lord Stanley
- Baron Monteagle (1541 creation)
- Baron Stanley
- Baron Stanley of Alderley
- Baron Strange
- Oliver Stanley
- Parliament Square
