= Charlotte Stanley, Countess of Derby =

English noblewoman (1599–1664)

Charlotte Stanley
- Countess of Derby
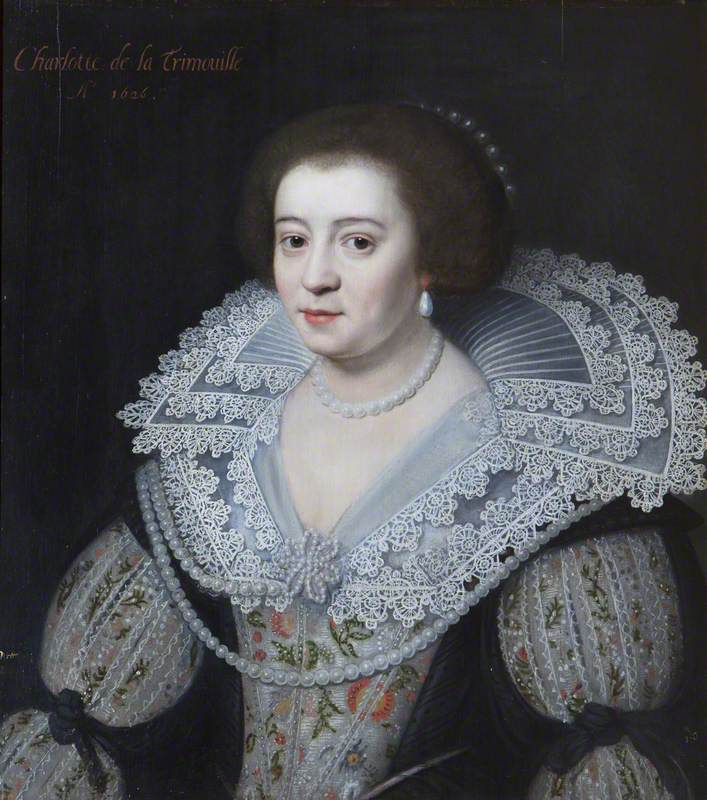
- Portrait by Michiel Jansz. van Mierevelt, 1626
- Born: Charlotte de La Trémoille; December 1599; Thouars, France
- Died: 31 March 1664 (aged 64)
- Noble family: La Trémoille (by birth); Stanley (by marriage)
- Spouse: James Stanley, 7th Earl of Derby (m. 1626; died 1651)
- Issue among others..: Charles Stanley, 8th Earl of Derby
- Father: Claude de La Trémoille
- Mother: Charlotte Brabantina of Nassau

Charlotte Stanley, Countess of Derby (December 1599 – 31 March 1664), born Charlotte de La Trémoille, was a French noblewoman who was famous for her robust defence of Lathom House during the English Civil War.

== Early life ==
Charlotte, born at the chateau of Thouars, Poitou, in France, was the daughter of the French nobleman Claude de La Trémoille, 2nd Duke of Thouars, and his wife, Countess Charlotte Brabantina of Nassau. Her maternal grandparents were William I, Prince of Orange, and Charlotte de Bourbon.

On 26 June 1626, Charlotte married the English nobleman James Stanley, 7th Earl of Derby, and was naturalised as an English citizen by Act of Parliament in February 1629.

Her husband was a Royalist commander in the English Civil War, later taken prisoner at Nantwich in 1651 and beheaded at Bolton.

== English Civil War ==
Lady Derby was famous for her defence of Lathom House in the Siege of Lathom House by Parliamentary forces during the First English Civil War in 1644. During the absence of her spouse, she was left in charge of what turned out to be the last remaining Royalist stronghold in Lancashire.

Immediately after the fall of Warrington, she was requested to acknowledge Parliament's authority and surrender her house, but she refused on the grounds that doing so would dishonour her husband. She offered to limit herself to defending her home and this postponed further attacks on her position.

In February 1644, Latham House was besieged by the forces of Sir Thomas Fairfax. Lady Derby had fortified the castle to resist bombardment and assembled a militia of seasoned marksmen who were able to inflict significant losses by sniping. She expressly refused repeated offers of surrender. On 27 May 1644, Prince Rupert arrived with Royalist forces and the siege was broken. Lady Derby and her staff were evacuated to the Isle of Man. Lady Derby's heroic defence of Lathom House is commemorated in Letitia Elizabeth Landon's poetical illustration in Fisher's Drawing Room Scrap Book, 1833 to a portrait of Lord and Lady Derby (by William Derby after van Dyck).

== Isle of Man ==
Her husband was also Lord of Mann. Lady Derby's attempt to barter the Island for her husband's freedom provoked an anti-English revolt led by Illiam Dhone.

Lady Derby was holding Man, but the total destruction of the Royal army at the Battle of Worcester, the flight of Prince Charles to an exile in France and the execution of her husband left her without hope of assistance. The last Royalist stronghold to surrender to parliamentarian forces at the conclusion of civil war hostilities was Castle Rushen at Castletown on the Isle of Man, defended under the leadership of the redoubtable Charlotte, widow of James Stanley, 7th Earl of Derby. It yielded to Colonel Duckenfield in October 1651.

She eventually yielded with reluctance to the necessity of a surrender and retained, says David Hume incorrectly, "the glory of being the last person in the three kingdoms, and in all their dependent dominions, who submitted to the victorious rebels". (Note: Not all historians agree with this assessment. Jonathan Duncan postulated that Elizabeth Castle on Jersey may have surrendered later; (Sir George Carteret, the governor of the castle, surrendered it on 15 December 1651).) The last holdout against Cromwellian forces occurred on the island of Inishbofin, County Galway, Ireland in 1653.

== Family ==
Charlotte and Derby were parents of four daughters and six sons. Only five of their children appear to have survived to a marriageable age:

- Charles Stanley, 8th Earl of Derby (19 January 1628 – 21 December 1672).
- Lady Henriette Mary Stanley (17 November 1630 – 27 December 1685) married William Wentworth, 2nd Earl of Strafford.
- Lady Catherine Stanley (4 December 1631 – 1652) married Henry Pierrepont, 1st Marquess of Dorchester.
- Lady Amelia Ann Sophia Stanley (17 July 1633 – 22 February 1702/3) married John Murray, 1st Marquess of Atholl.
- John Stanley (4 November 1641 – 10 September 1719) married a commoner, Alice Biddle.

Charles's two sons, William, the 9th Earl (c. 1655–1702), and James, the 10th (1664–1736), both died without sons, and consequently, when James died in February 1736, his titles and estates passed to Sir Edward Stanley (1689–1776), a descendant of the 1st Earl. From him the later Earls of Derby are descended.
