= List of vice-admirals of Lancashire =

This is a list of people who have served as Vice-Admiral of Lancashire.

Lancashire and Cheshire

- Edward Stanley, 3rd Earl of Derby bef. 1569–1572
- Henry Stanley, 4th Earl of Derby 1573–1593
- Ferdinando Stanley, 5th Earl of Derby 1593–1594
- vacant
- William Stanley, 6th Earl of Derby bef. 1606–1638
- James Stanley, 7th Earl of Derby 1638–?

Lancashire

- John Moore 1644–1650 (Parliamentary)
- Interregnum
- Charles Stanley, 8th Earl of Derby 1661–1672 (also Vice-Admiral of Cheshire)
- William Banks 1673–1676 (also Vice-Admiral of Cheshire)
- vacant
- William Stanley, 9th Earl of Derby 1684–1691 (also Vice-Admiral of Cheshire)
- Charles Gerard, 2nd Earl of Macclesfield 1691–1701 (also Vice-Admiral of Cheshire)
- Richard Savage, 4th Earl Rivers 1702 (also Vice-Admiral of Cheshire)
- James Stanley, 10th Earl of Derby 1702–1712
- James Douglas-Hamilton, 4th Duke of Hamilton 1712
- vacant
- Edward Stanley, 13th Earl of Derby 1831–1851
- vacant
- Edward Stanley, 19th Earl of Derby 2023–present
