= Vice-Admiral of Cheshire =

Vice Admiral of Cheshire
- Active: 1559–1835
- Country: United Kingdom
- Branch: Royal Navy
- Type: Naval administration
- Role: Admiralty court and Naval Jurisdiction.

The holder of the post Vice-Admiral of Cheshire was responsible for the defence County of Cheshire, England. As a Vice-Admiral, the post holder was the chief of naval administration for his district. His responsibilities included pressing men for naval service, deciding the lawfulness of prizes (captured by privateers), dealing with salvage claims for wrecks and acting as a judge.

== History ==
The earliest record of an appointment was of Edward Stanley, 3rd Earl of Derby bef. 1569–1572

In 1863 the Registrar of the Admiralty Court stated that the offices had 'for many years been purely honorary' (HCA 50/24 pp. 235–6). Appointments were made by the Lord High Admiral when this officer existed. When the admiralty was in commission appointments were made by the crown by letters patent under the seal of the admiralty court.

== Vice Admirals of Cheshire ==
This is a list of people who have served as Vice-Admiral of Cheshire.

Cheshire and Lancashire

- Edward Stanley, 3rd Earl of Derby bef. 1569–1572
- Henry Stanley, 4th Earl of Derby 1573–1593
- Ferdinando Stanley, 5th Earl of Derby 1593–1594
- vacant
- William Stanley, 6th Earl of Derby bef. 1606–1638
- James Stanley, 7th Earl of Derby 1638–?

Cheshire

- Sir William Brereton, 1st Baronet 1644–1649
- Interregnum
- Charles Stanley, 8th Earl of Derby 1661–1672 (also Vice-Admiral of Lancashire)
- William Banks 1673–1676 (also Vice-Admiral of Lancashire)
- vacant
- William Stanley, 9th Earl of Derby 1684–1691 (also Vice-Admiral of Lancashire)
- Charles Gerard, 2nd Earl of Macclesfield 1691–1701 (also Vice-Admiral of Lancashire)
- Richard Savage, 4th Earl Rivers 1702–1703 (also Vice-Admiral of Lancashire)
- Hugh Cholmondeley, 1st Earl of Cholmondeley 1703–1725
- George Cholmondeley, 2nd Earl of Cholmondeley 1725–1733
- George Cholmondeley, 3rd Earl of Cholmondeley 1733–1770
- George Cholmondeley, 1st Marquess of Cholmondeley 1770–1827
- George Grey, 6th Earl of Stamford 1827–1845
- vacant
- Bertram Talbot, 17th Earl of Shrewsbury 1854–1856
