= Caryll Molyneux, 3rd Viscount Molyneux =

Irish peer

Caryll Molyneux, 3rd Viscount Molyneux (1623/24 – 1700) was an English peer.

== Life ==
He was the younger son of Richard Molyneux, 1st Viscount Molyneux and Mary Caryll, daughter of Sir Thomas Caryll of Bentone in Sussex. He inherited the title from his elder brother, Richard Molyneux, 2nd Viscount Molyneux, in 1654. He married Mary Barlow, daughter of Sir Alexander Barlow of Barlow (elder brother of the Catholic martyr Ambrose Barlow) and his wife Dorothy Gresley, by whom he had one surviving son, William, and five daughters, Mary, Frances, Margaret, Elizabeth and Anne.

Molyneux joined the Royalist army at the outbreak of the English Civil War, and served with his brother in the Lancashire Regiment, which was mostly Catholic, through almost all the fighting from Manchester (1642) to Worcester (1651). After the death of his brother in 1654, he succeeded to the viscounty and the constableship of Liverpool Castle. As a well-known Catholic Cavalier, he experienced harsh treatment from the victors; and the family estates suffered.

It was not until the reign of James II that Molyneux's fortunes improved. He was then appointed Custos Rotulorum of Lancashire (1685–89), Lord Lieutenant of Lancashire (1687–1688) and Admiral of the Narrow Seas, and was one of the few who fought with any success on James's side against the Prince of Orange, seizing and holding Chester, until all further resistance was in vain. After using the castle to store arms, he was arrested on a fabricated charge of treason for a suspected Jacobite rebellion called "The Lancashire plot". Along with other Catholics, he was imprisoned in the Tower of London, but was acquitted in 1694. He did not however recover the hereditary constableship, and the castle was leased to the burgesses, who in 1704 were authorised by the Crown to destroy it.

After Viscount Molyneux's death at Croxteth in 1700, his title passed to his only surviving son, William Molyneux, 4th Viscount Molyneux.

Honorary titles
Preceded by The Earl of Derby	Lord Lieutenant of Lancashire; 1687–1688	Succeeded by The Earl of Derby
Peerage of Ireland
Preceded by Richard Molyneux	Viscount Molyneux; 1654–1699	Succeeded by William Molyneux
