= Richard Savage, 4th Earl Rivers =

English nobleman and soldier

General The Right Honorable The Earl Rivers PC

Personal details
- Born: Richard Savage ca. 1654 London, Middlesex, England
- Died: 18 August 1712 (aged 57–58) Ealing Grove, Middlesex, London, England, Great Britain

Military service
- Allegiance: England (1686–1707); Great Britain (1707–1712)
- Branch/service: English Army; British Army
- Years of service: 1686–1712
- Rank: General
- Commands: Master-General of the Ordnance; Constable of the Tower of London
- Battles/wars: Williamite War in Ireland; War of the Spanish Succession

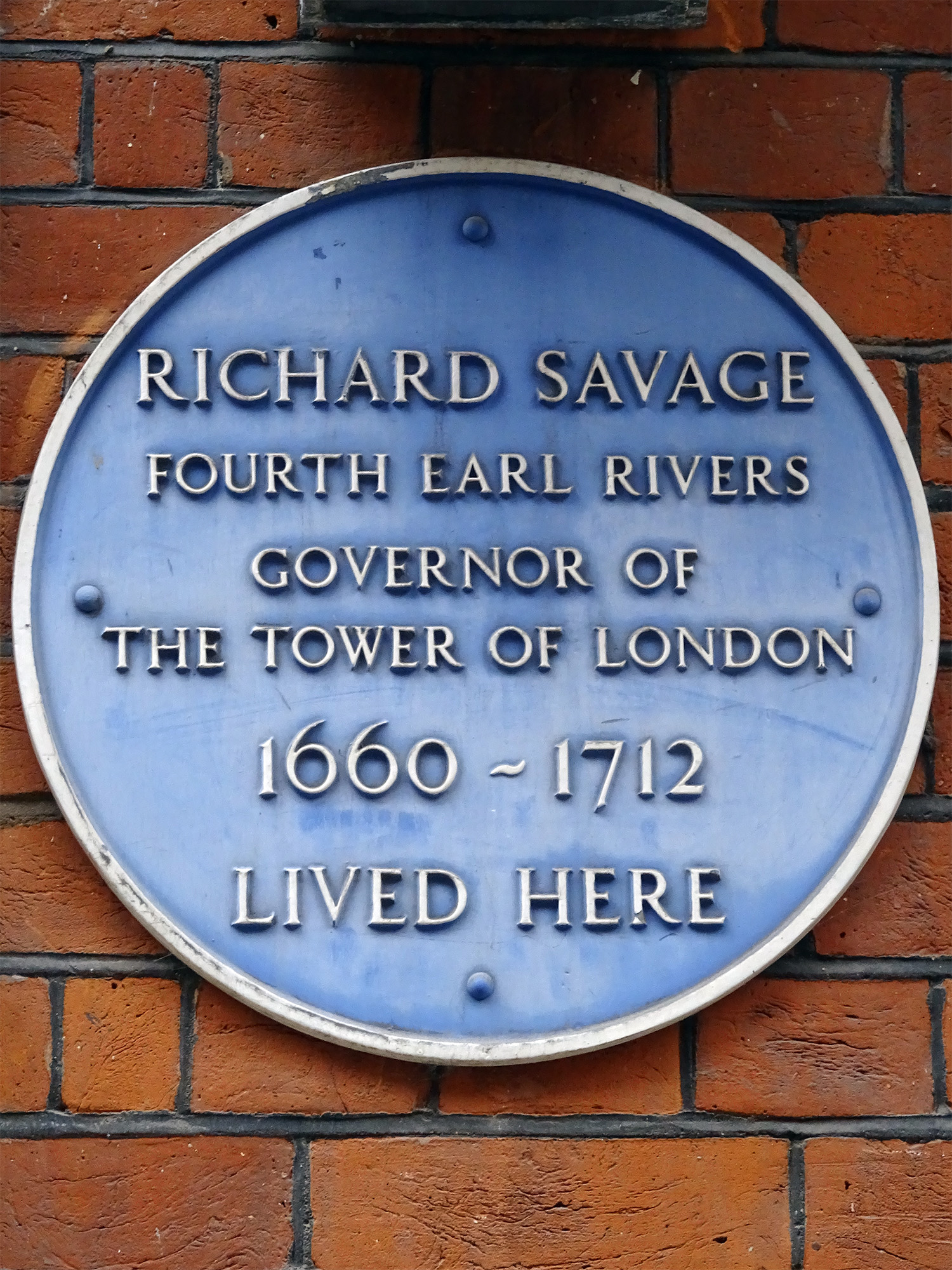
Blue plaque at 9 Old Queen Street Westminster London SW1H 9HP

General Richard Savage, 4th Earl Rivers PC (ca. 1654 – 18 August 1712) was an English nobleman and soldier who was a senior Army officer in the English and then British Army. The second son of Thomas Savage, 3rd Earl Rivers and his first wife Elizabeth Scrope, Savage was styled Viscount Colchester after the death of his elder brother Thomas in 1680, he was designated by that title until he succeeded to the peerage upon the death of his father, the 3rd Earl, in 1694. Savage served as Master-General of the Ordnance and Constable of the Tower, and was briefly commander-in-chief of the forces in lieu of James Butler, 2nd Duke of Ormonde until his death in 1712.

== Early life and career ==
A member of the Savage family, Richard Savage was the second son of Thomas Savage, 3rd Earl Rivers. Early in life, Richard acquired notoriety as a rake and he would carry this reputation throughout his life, fathering several bastard children and being noted for his 'dare-devilry and dissipation'. After becoming Viscount Colchester on his brother's death he entered Parliament as member for Wigan in 1681 and procured a commission in the Horseguards under Sarsfield in 1686. Savage served as MP for Wigan until 1685. He was the first nobleman and one of the first persons who joined the Prince of Orange on his landing in England in November 1688, and he accompanied William to London. Savage later became the MP for Liverpool in 1689.

Obtaining promotion in the army, he served with distinction in the Williamite war in Ireland and in the Netherlands and was made Major-General in 1698 and Lieutenant-General in 1702. In 1694 he succeeded his father as 4th Earl Rivers and could no longer continue as a Member of Parliament, instead taking his father's seat in the House of Lords. He served abroad in 1702 under Marlborough, who formed a high opinion of his military capacity and who recommended him for the command of a force for an invasion of France in 1706. The expedition was eventually diverted to Portugal, and Rivers, finding himself superseded before anything was accomplished, returned to England, where Marlborough procured for him a command in the cavalry.

The favour shown him by Marlborough did not deter Rivers from paying court to the Tories when it became evident that the Whig ascendancy was waning, and his appointment as constable of the Tower in 1710 on the recommendation of Harley and without Marlborough's knowledge was the first unmistakable intimation to the Whigs of their impending fall. Rivers now met with marked favour at court, being entrusted with a delicate mission to the Elector of Hanover in 1710, which was followed by his appointment in 1711 as Master-General of the Ordnance, a post hitherto held by Marlborough himself.

In 1708, he became one of the first members to be sworn in as a member of the Privy Council of the United Kingdom following the Acts of Union under Queen Anne.

== Personal life ==
Jonathan Swift, who was intimate with Earl Rivers, speaks of him as an 'arrant knave'; but the dean may have been disappointed at being unmentioned in Rivers's will, for he made a fierce comment on the earl's bequests to his mistresses and his neglect of his friends. In June 1712 Rivers was promoted to the rank of general, and became commander-in-chief in England; he died a few weeks later, on 18 August 1712.

He married in 1679 Penelope, daughter of Roger Downes, by whom he had a daughter Elizabeth, who married the 4th Earl of Barrymore. He also left several illegitimate children, two of whom were by Anne, Countess of Macclesfield. Rivers' intrigue with Lady Macclesfield was the cause of that lady's divorce from her husband Charles Gerard, 2nd Earl of Macclesfield in 1701. Richard Savage, the poet, claimed identity with Lady Macclesfield's son by Lord Rivers, but though his story was accepted by Dr Johnson and was generally believed, the evidence in its support is faulty in several respects. As Rivers left no legitimate son the earldom passed on his death to his cousin, John Savage, grandson of the 2nd earl, and a priest in the Roman Catholic Church, on whose death, about 1735, all the family titles became extinct.

Parliament of England
| Preceded by The Earl of Ancram; William Banks | Member of Parliament for Wigan; 1681–1685; With: The Earl of Ancram | Succeeded by The Earl of Ancram; Lord Charles Murray |
| Preceded by Sir Richard Atherton; Thomas Legh | Member of Parliament for Liverpool; 1689–1694; With: Thomas Norris | Succeeded by Thomas Norris; Thomas Brotherton |
Military offices
| Preceded by Sir John Fenwick, Bt | Colonel of Viscount Colchester's Regiment of Horse; 1688–1692 | Succeeded by The Lord Berkeley of Stratton |
| Preceded by The Duke of Marlborough | Captain and Colonel of the 3rd Troop of Horse Guards; 1692–1703 | Succeeded by The Earl of Arran |
| Preceded by The Duke of Marlborough | Master-General of the Ordnance; 1712 | Succeeded by The Duke of Hamilton |
| Preceded by The Duke of Northumberland | Colonel of the Royal Horse Guards; 1712 | Succeeded by The Earl of Peterborough |
Honorary titles
| Preceded by The Earl of Warrington | Lord Lieutenant of Cheshire; 1695–1703 | Succeeded by The Viscount Cholmondeley |
| Preceded by The Earl of Macclesfield | Vice-Admiral of Cheshire; 1702–1703 | Succeeded by The Viscount Cholmondeley |
| Preceded by The Earl of Macclesfield | Lord Lieutenant of Lancashire; 1702 | Succeeded by The 9th Earl of Derby |
| Preceded by The Earl of Macclesfield | Vice-Admiral of Lancashire; 1702 | Succeeded by The 10th Earl of Derby |
| Preceded by The Lord Guilford | Lord Lieutenant of Essex; 1705–1712 | Succeeded by The Viscount Bolingbroke |
| Preceded by Sir Charles Barrington, Bt | Vice-Admiral of Essex; 1705–1712 | Succeeded by Sir Charles Barrington, Bt |
| Preceded by The Earl of Essex | Constable of the Tower; Lord Lieutenant of the Tower Hamlets; 1710–1712 | Succeeded by The Earl of Northampton |
Peerage of England
| Preceded by Thomas Savage | Earl Rivers; 1694–1712 | Succeeded by John Savage |
