= John Egerton, 2nd Earl of Bridgewater =

English nobleman (1623–1686)

John Egerton PC
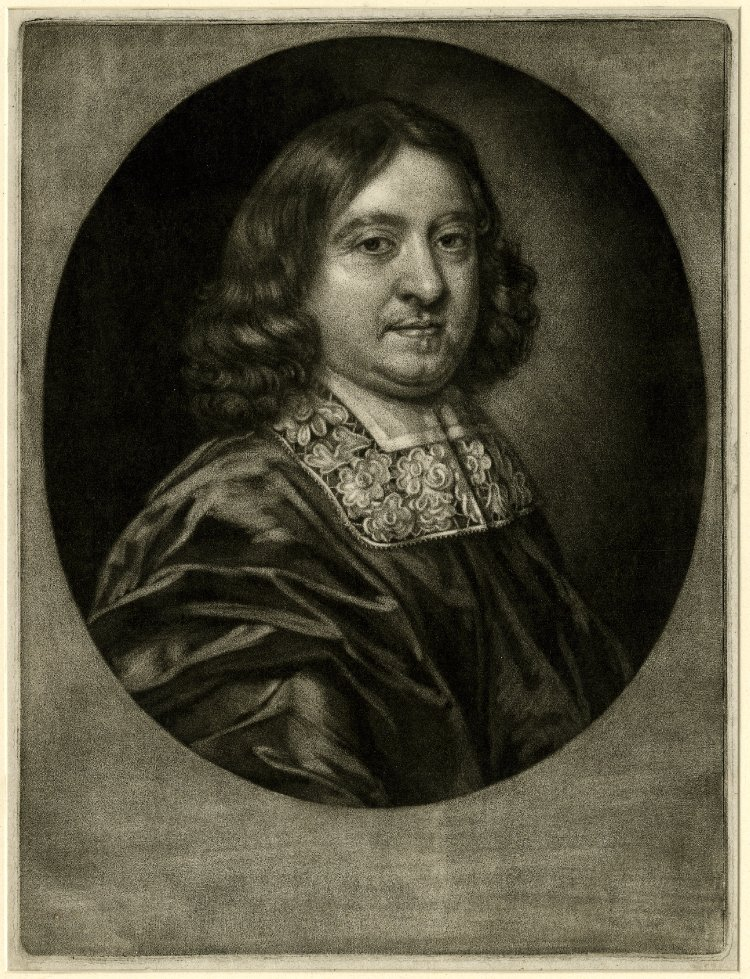

2nd Earl of Bridgewater
- Reign: 1649–1686
- Predecessor: John Egerton, 1st Earl of Bridgewater
- Successor: John Egerton, 3rd Earl of Bridgewater
- Born: 30 May 1623
- Died: 26 October 1686 (aged 63)
- Buried: Little Gaddesden, Hertfordshire
- Noble family: Egerton
- Spouse: Lady Elizabeth Cavendish (m. 1641)
- Issue: John Egerton, 3rd Earl of Bridgewater; Sir William Egerton KB; Thomas Egerton; Charles Egerton MP; Elizabeth Egerton
- Father: John Egerton, 1st Earl of Bridgewater
- Mother: Lady Frances Stanley

John Egerton, 2nd Earl of Bridgewater, PC (30 May 1623 – 26 October 1686), was an English nobleman from the Egerton family.

== Life ==
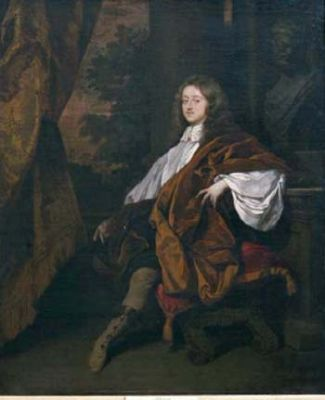
John Egerton, 2nd Earl of Bridgwater, by Peter Lely (1665)

The surviving son of John Egerton, 1st Earl of Bridgewater, and his wife Lady Frances Stanley, his maternal grandparents were Ferdinando Stanley, 5th Earl of Derby, and Lady Alice Spencer. According to the Will of King Henry VIII, his mother, at one time, was second-in-line to inherit England's throne. However, Frances, Countess of Bridgewater's elder sister, Lady Anne Stanley, was passed over in favour of King James VI of Scotland.

Styled Viscount Brackley before succeeding to the earldom in 1649, he served as Lord Lieutenant of Buckinghamshire (1660–1686), Cheshire (1670–1676), Lancashire (1670–1676), and Hertfordshire (1681–1686), as well as being sworn of the Privy Council in 1679.

Lord Bridgewater was buried at Little Gaddesden, Hertfordshire.

== Family ==
Egerton arms: Argent, a lion rampant gules between three pheons sable

In 1641, as Lord Brackley, he married Lady Elizabeth Cavendish (1626–1663), a daughter of William Cavendish, 1st Duke of Newcastle, and his first wife Elizabeth Basset. Lord and Lady Bridgewater's children included:

- John Egerton, 3rd Earl of Bridgewater (9 November 1646–19 March 1701)
- Sir William Egerton KB (15 August 1649–24 December 1691), who married Honora Leigh
- Thomas Egerton (1651–1685), of Tatton Park, ancestor of the Barons and Earls Egerton
- two other sons
- Charles Egerton MP
- Elizabeth Egerton (24 August 1653 – 1709), who married Robert Sidney, 4th Earl of Leicester
- two other daughters.

== See also ==
- Egerton family

Honorary titles
| Vacant English Interregnum Title last held by The Lord Wharton | Lord Lieutenant of Buckinghamshire; 1660–1686 | Succeeded by The 3rd Earl of Bridgewater |
| Vacant English Interregnum Title last held by The 1st Earl of Bridgewater | Custos Rotulorum of Buckinghamshire; 1660–1686 | Succeeded by The Lord Jeffreys |
| Preceded by The 8th Earl of Derby | Lord Lieutenant of Cheshire and Lancashire; 1673–1676 | Succeeded by The 9th Earl of Derby |
| Preceded by The 1st Earl of Essex | Lord Lieutenant of Hertfordshire; 1681–1686 | Succeeded by The 1st Earl of Rochester |
Peerage of England
| Preceded by John Egerton | Earl of Bridgewater; 2nd creation 1649–1686 | Succeeded by John Egerton |
