= Edward Stanley, 3rd Earl of Derby =

English nobleman and politician (1509–1572)

- Earl of Derby
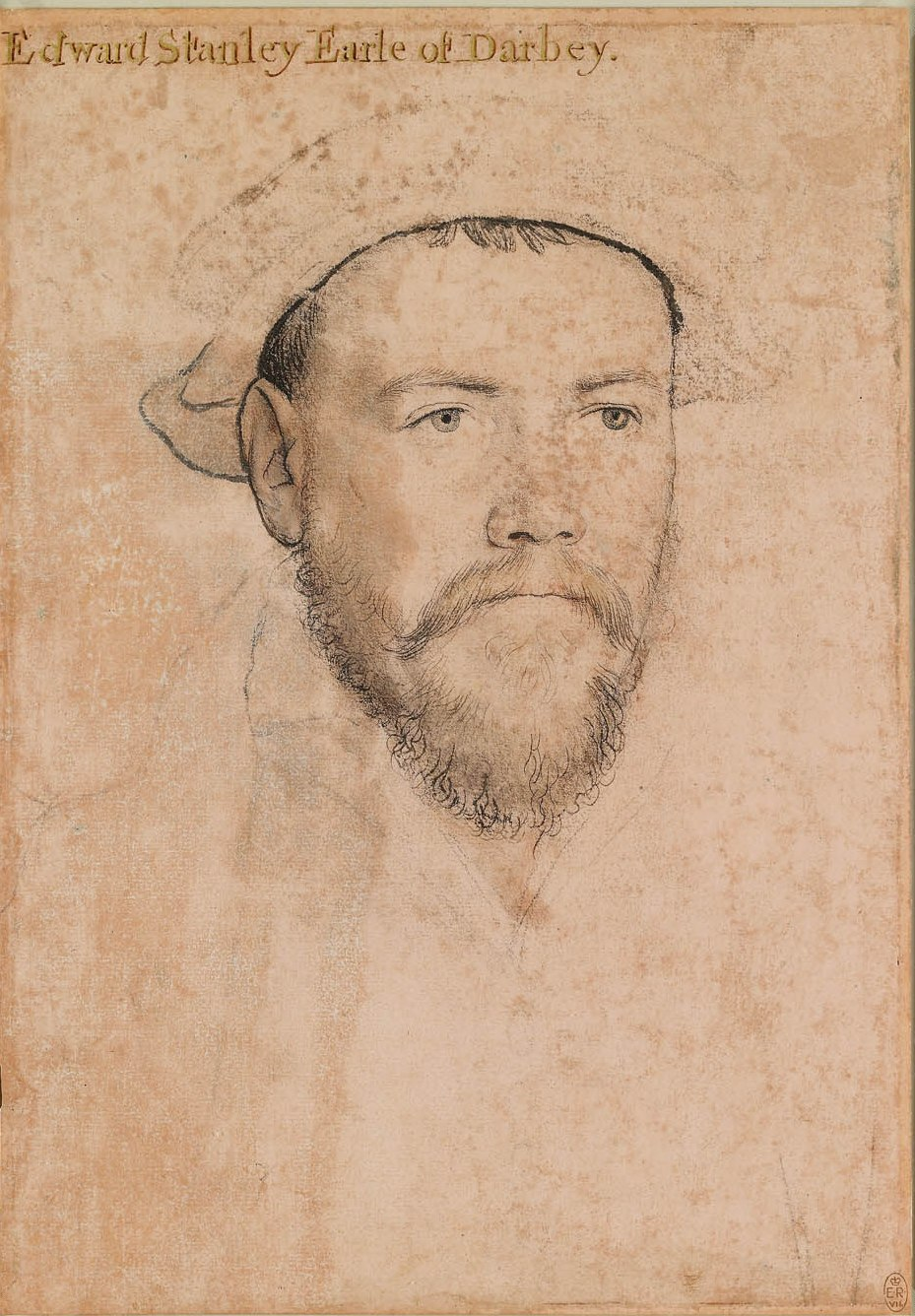

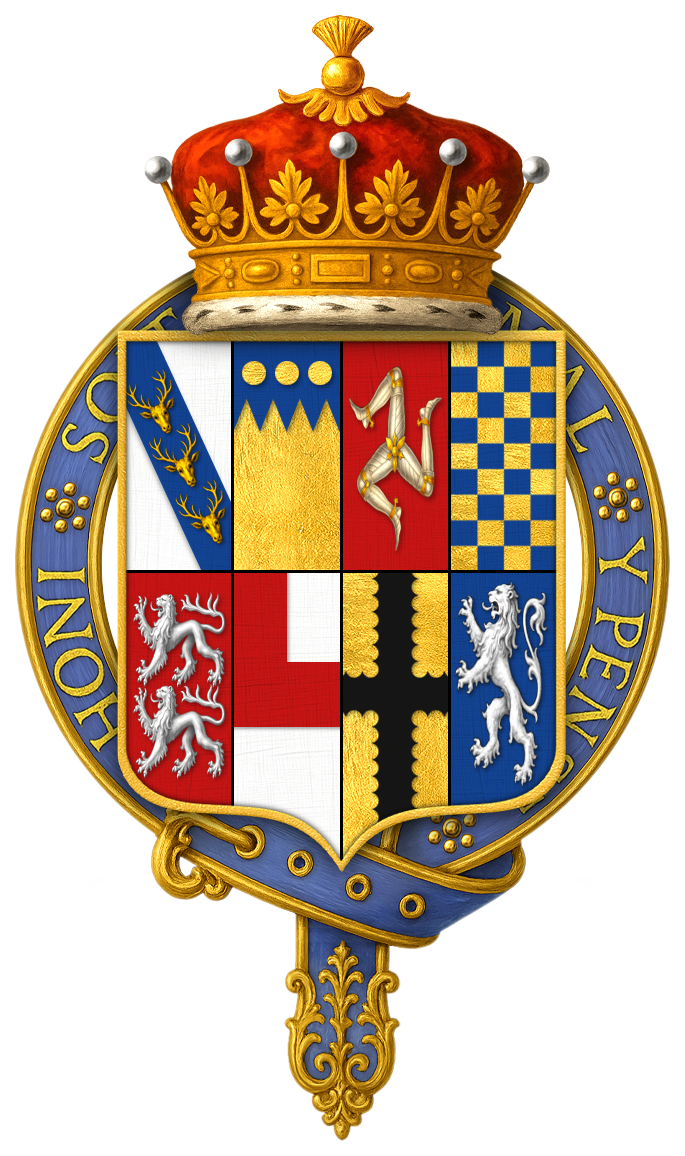
- Coat of arms
- Tenure: 1521-1572
- Predecessor: Thomas Stanley, 2nd Earl of Derby
- Successor: Henry Stanley, 4th Earl of Derby
- Born: 10 May 1509
- Died: 24 October 1572 (aged 63); Lathom House
- Spouses: Catherine Howard (m. 1529; died 1530): Dorothy Howard
- Issue: Henry Stanley, 4th Earl of Derby; Lady Elizabeth Stanley; Jane Stanley; Mary Stanley; Thomas Stanley; Anne Stanley; Margaret Stanley

Edward Stanley, 3rd Earl of Derby (c. 10 May 1509– 24 October 1572) was an English nobleman and politician. He succeeded his father as Lord of Mann until his death, and then was succeeded by his son.

== Early life ==
At the age of thirteen, Edward received the titles and estates of his father, the 2nd Earl of Derby, and King Henry VIII took responsibility for bringing him up until he was of age. His commissioners, including Cardinal Thomas Wolsey, were responsible for most of his affairs.

In 1528, he accompanied Cardinal Wolsey on a mission to France, and in 1530, he was one of the peers who gave Pope Clement VII the declaration regarding Henry's divorce from Catherine of Aragon.

== Marriages and issue ==
In 1530, Thomas Howard, 3rd Duke of Norfolk bought the remaining year of Edward Stanley's wardship and married him, without the King's permission, to his daughter, Katherine Howard. The King rebuked Norfolk, but allowed the marriage. Katherine fell victim to the plague a few weeks later. Undeterred, Norfolk arranged for a marriage between his half-sister, Dorothy Howard, and Edward Stanley, with whom he had issue:

- Henry Stanley, 4th Earl of Derby
- Elizabeth (1533–1590) wife of Henry Parker, 11th Baron Morley
- Jane (d. 1569) wife of Edward Sutton, 4th Baron Dudley
- Mary (d. 1609) wife of Edward Stafford, 3rd Baron Stafford
- Thomas, great-grandfather of Venetia Stanley
- Anne, wife of Charles Stourton, 8th Baron Stourton, then of Sir John Arundell of Lanherne
- Margaret (d. 1585), widow of John Germin & 2nd wife of Sir Nicholas Poyntz (d. 1585/86) of Iron Acton, Glos.

== Later career ==
In 1532, Edward accompanied King Henry to Boulogne, where they met with King Francis I of France. After this meeting, Edward became a Knight of the Bath. A few years later, Edward took a major role in quelling the Pilgrimage of Grace, a large (mainly church-related) rebellion started in Lincolnshire and spread into North England. In 1542, Edward accompanied the Duke of Norfolk on a raid into Scotland.

When Edward VI ascended to the throne in 1547, Edward became a Knight of the Garter, and in 1550, he was one of the peers who were present at the peace proceedings with Scotland and France. A year later, various charges were brought against him (with little or no evidence), mainly due to his opposition to clerical reform. However, when Queen Mary I ascended to the throne, he was again in favour, and was appointed Lord High Steward and became a Privy Councillor. He was a commissioner of Lady Jane Grey's trial and was frequently present during the trials of accused heretics. He remained in favour under Queen Elizabeth I's reign, and remained on her Privy Council. She eventually appointed him Chamberlain of Chester.

Edward Stanley died at Lathom House, and his titles and estates were passed on to his eldest son, Henry Stanley.

== Ancestry ==
Ancestors of Edward Stanley, 3rd Earl of Derby

8. Thomas Stanley, 1st Earl of Derby
4. George Stanley, 9th Baron Strange
9. Lady Eleanor Nevill
2. Thomas Stanley, 2nd Earl of Derby
10. John le Strange, 8th Baron Strange
5. Joan le Strange, 9th Baroness Strange
11. Jacquetta Woodville
1. Edward Stanley, 3rd Earl of Derby
12. William Hastings, 1st Baron Hastings
6. Edward Hastings, 2nd Baron Hastings
13. Katherine Neville, Baroness Hastings
3. Anne Hastings
14. Thomas Hungerford of Rowden
7. Mary Hungerford
15. Lady Anne Percy

== Footnotes ==
Honorary titles
Unknown	Lord Lieutenant of Lancashire; 1552–1572	Succeeded by The Earl of Derby
Unknown	Vice-Admiral of Lancashire; 1569–1572	Succeeded by The Earl of Derby
Unknown	Lord Lieutenant of Cheshire; Vice-Admiral of Cheshire; 1569–1572	Succeeded by The Earl of Derby
Head of State of the Isle of Man
Preceded by Thomas Stanley	Lord of Mann; 1521–1572	Succeeded by Henry Stanley
Peerage of England
Preceded by Thomas Stanley	Earl of Derby; 1521–1572	Succeeded by Henry Stanley
Preceded by Thomas Stanley	Baron Strange (descended by acceleration); 1521–1559	Succeeded by Henry Stanley
