= James Stanley, 7th Earl of Derby =

English nobleman and politician (1607–1651)

James Stanley, 7th Earl of Derby KG
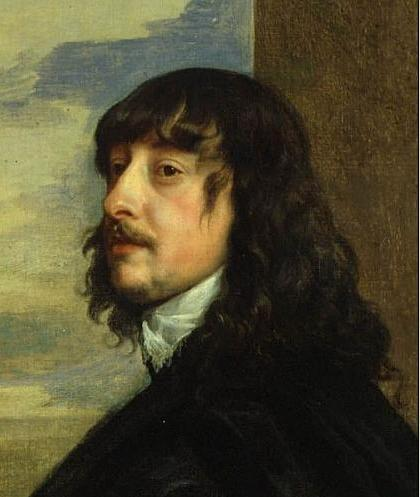
- James Stanley, 7th Earl of Derby, portrait by van Dyck, circa 1632/41, Frick Collection, New York
- Born: 31 January 1607; Knowsley Hall, Kingdom of England
- Died: 15 October 1651 (aged 44); Bolton, Commonwealth of England
- Burial place: Church of St Peter and St Paul, Ormskirk
- Military career
- Allegiance: Royalist
- Conflicts: Bolton Massacre, Battle of Marston Moor, Battle of Wigan Lane, Battle of Worcester

Arms of Stanley: Argent, on a bend azure three buck's heads cabossed or

James Stanley, 7th Earl of Derby (31 January 1607 – 15 October 1651) was an English nobleman, politician, and supporter of the Royalist cause in the English Civil War. Before inheriting the title in 1642 he was known as Lord Strange. He was feudal Lord of the Isle of Man ("Lord of Man"), where he was known as "Yn Stanlagh Mooar" ("the Great Stanley").

== Origins ==
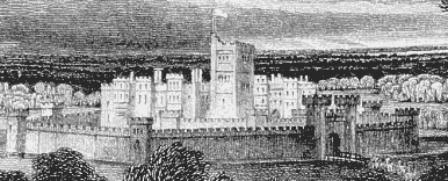
Artist's impression (1864) of Lathom House, at the time of the Civil War. Built in 1496 by Thomas Stanley, 1st Earl of Derby (circa 1435–1504). It had 18 towers, was surrounded by a wall 6 feet thick and a moat 8 yards wide, its drawbridge defended by a gateway tower. In the centre was a tall tower known as the Eagle Tower

He was born at Knowsley Hall, near Lathom House, on 31 January 1607, the eldest son of William Stanley, 6th Earl of Derby (1561–1642), KG, by his wife Elizabeth de Vere, a daughter of Edward de Vere, 17th Earl of Oxford. Through his paternal grandmother, he was a great-great-grandson of Mary Tudor, Queen of France and Charles Brandon, 1st Duke of Suffolk, thereby making him a direct descendant of Henry VII.

== Early life ==
After travelling abroad he was elected as a Member of Parliament for Liverpool in 1625. On 2 February 1626 he was created a Knight of the Bath on the coronation of King Charles I. 1626 he served jointly with his father as Lord Lieutenant of Lancashire, Lord Lieutenant of Cheshire and Chamberlain of the City of Chester. He assisted in the administration of the Isle of Man and in 1627 was appointed Lord of Mann, a position first awarded in 1405 by King Henry IV to his ancestor John Stanley (c. 1350–1414), KG. Subsequently, he was appointed Lord Lieutenant of North Wales.

== Created Baron Strange ==
Arms of Strange de Knockin: Gules, two lions passant argent. Quartered by Stanley

The ancient title Baron Strange of Knockyn, created in 1299, as it had been created by writ, was capable of being inherited by females. It had become abeyant in 1594 following the death leaving no sons of Ferdinando Stanley, 5th Earl of Derby, 13th Baron Strange (1559–1594), who however left three daughters and co-heiresses legally capable of inheriting the ancient title of Baron, whereupon it became abeyant between all three. They were not, however, as females, legally capable of inheriting the Earldom, which went to his younger brother William Stanley, 6th Earl of Derby (1561–1642). By modern reckoning, the abeyance of the barony of Strange of Knockyn was not terminated until 1921.

However, in 1594 the status of this barony was not apparent to the family nor to the authorities in the House of Lords, and all parties assumed that the 6th Earl had also become 14th Baron Strange of Knockyn. On 7 March 1628 his son and heir apparent, James Stanley (later 7th Earl of Derby), was summoned to the House of Lords through a writ of acceleration as Lord Strange, the supposed subsidiary title of his father. When it was discovered that his father's assumption of the barony was erroneous, it was deemed that there were two baronies of Strange, one created in 1299 then in abeyance, and another created "accidentally" in 1628.

== Civil War ==
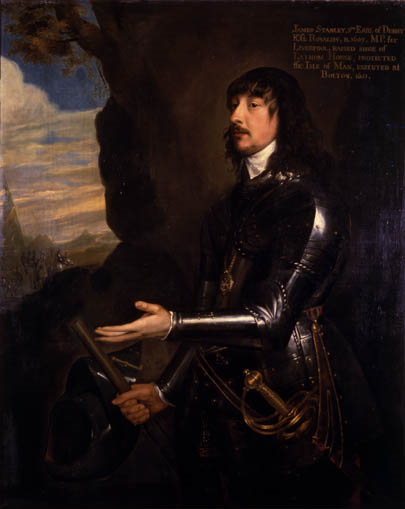
James Stanley, 7th Earl of Derby, after van Dyck, Collection of Government of Isle of Man

He took no part in the political disputes between King and Parliament and preferred country pursuits and the care of his estates to the royal court or public life. Nevertheless, when the Civil War broke out in 1642, Lord Strange devoted himself to the king's cause. With the death of his father on 29 September 1642 he succeeded as 7th Earl of Derby.

His plan of securing Lancashire at the beginning and raising troops there, which promised success, was however discouraged by Charles, said to be jealous of his power and royal lineage, who commanded his presence at Nottingham.

His subsequent attempts to recover the county were unsuccessful. He was unable to get possession of Manchester, was defeated at the battles of Chowbent and at Lowton Moor, and, in 1643, after gaining Preston he failed to take Bolton and Lancaster Castle. Finally, after successfully beating off the attack by Sir William Brereton on Warrington, he was defeated at the Battle of Whalley and withdrew to York, whereupon Warrington surrendered to the Parliamentarian forces.

In June 1643 he left for the Isle of Man to attend to affairs there. In the summer of 1644, he took part in Prince Rupert's successful campaign in the north. The Siege of Lathom House was relieved (the defence of which had been led by his wife Charlotte de la Tremoille), and the town of Bolton was taken with much bloodshed, in what became known as the Bolton Massacre.

He followed Rupert to the Battle of Marston Moor, and after the complete defeat of Charles's cause in the North, withdrew to the Isle of Man, where he held out for the king and offered asylum to royalist fugitives. His administration of the Isle imitated that of Thomas Wentworth, 1st Earl of Strafford in Ireland. It was strong rather than just. He maintained order, encouraged trade, remedied some abuses, and defended the people from the exactions of the church; but he crushed opposition by imprisoning his antagonists, and aroused a prolonged agitation by abolishing the tenant-right and introducing leaseholds.

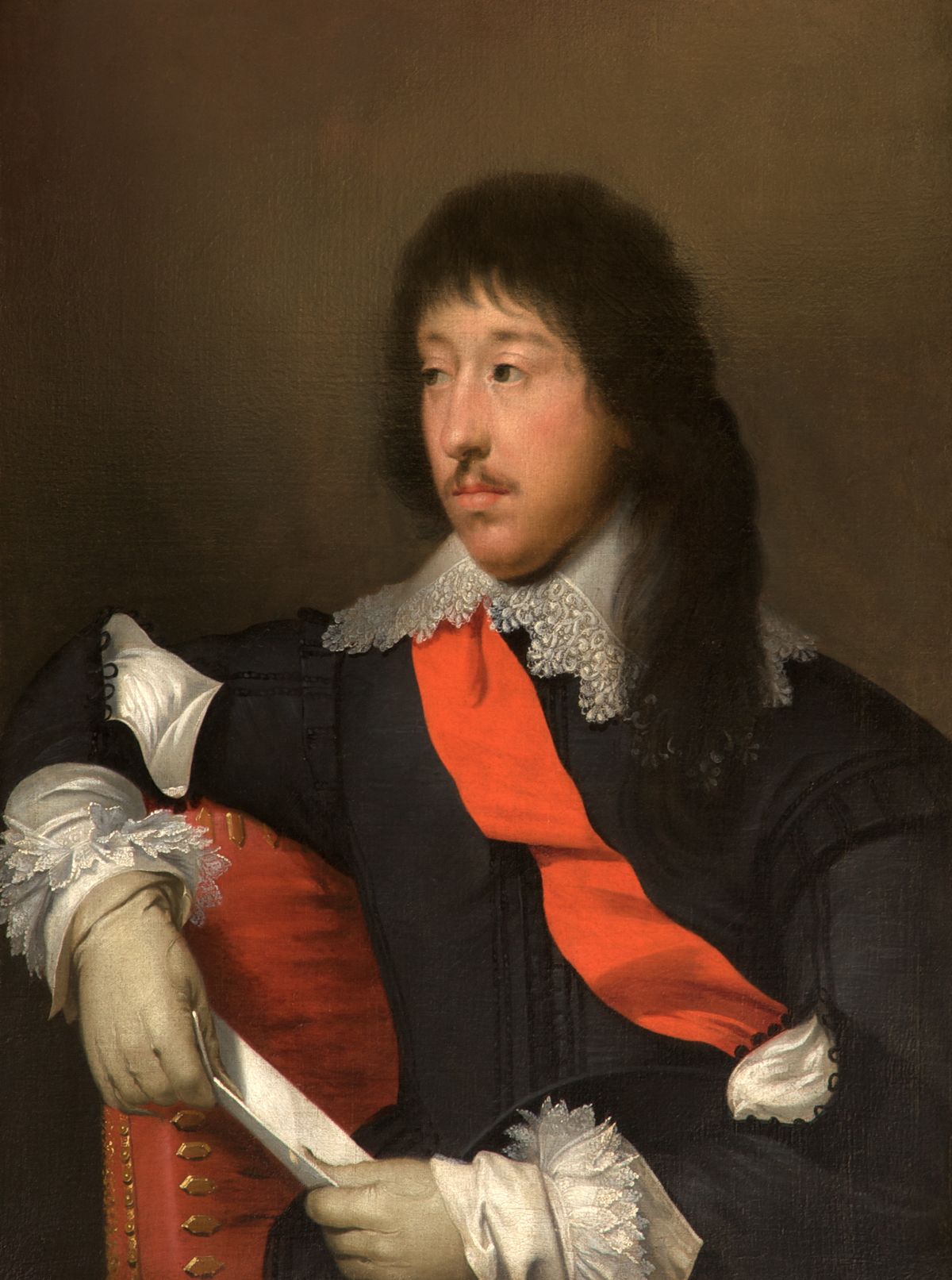
James Stanley, 7th Earl of Derby, portrait by Cornelius Johnson (1593–1661), Tabley House, Knutsford, Cheshire. Stanley was a man of deep religious feeling and of great nobility of character

In July 1649, following the execution of Charles I, he refused with scorn the terms offered him by Henry Ireton. On 12 January 1650, he was made a Knight of the Garter by the late king's exiled son the future Charles II. He was chosen by the future Charles II to command the troops of Lancashire and Cheshire, and on 15 August 1651, he landed at Wyre Water in Lancashire in support of Charles II's invasion, and met Charles on 17 August 1651. He proceeded to Warrington but failed to obtain the support of the Presbyterians due to his refusal to take the Covenant, and on 25 August was totally defeated at the Battle of Wigan Lane, being severely wounded and escaping with difficulty.

== Capture, execution and burial ==
He was with Charles at the Battle of Worcester, after which on 3 September 1651 he accompanied him to Boscobel House. While on his way north alone he was captured near Nantwich and was tried by court-martial at Chester on 29 September and was found guilty of treason under the terms of the Act of Parliament passed in the preceding month (which declared those who corresponded with Charles II guilty of treason), and he was condemned to death. His appeal to Parliament for pardon, although supported by Oliver Cromwell, was rejected. He endeavoured to escape but was recaptured by Captain Hector Schofield. He was taken to Bolton for his execution because of his part in the Bolton massacre.

He was beheaded on 15 October 1651 at the market cross in Churchgate, Bolton, near the Man and Scythe Inn, owned at the time by the Earl of Derby's family. Today the market cross bears an inscribed tablet commemorating the execution. In the Inn survives a chair inscribed "15 October 1651: In this chair James, 7th Earl of Derby sat at the Man and Scythe Inn, Churchgate, Bolton, immediately prior to his execution".

He was buried in the Derby Chapel, built in about 1572 in accordance with the will of the 3rd Earl of Derby, in the Church of St Peter and St Paul, Ormskirk.

== Marriage and children ==
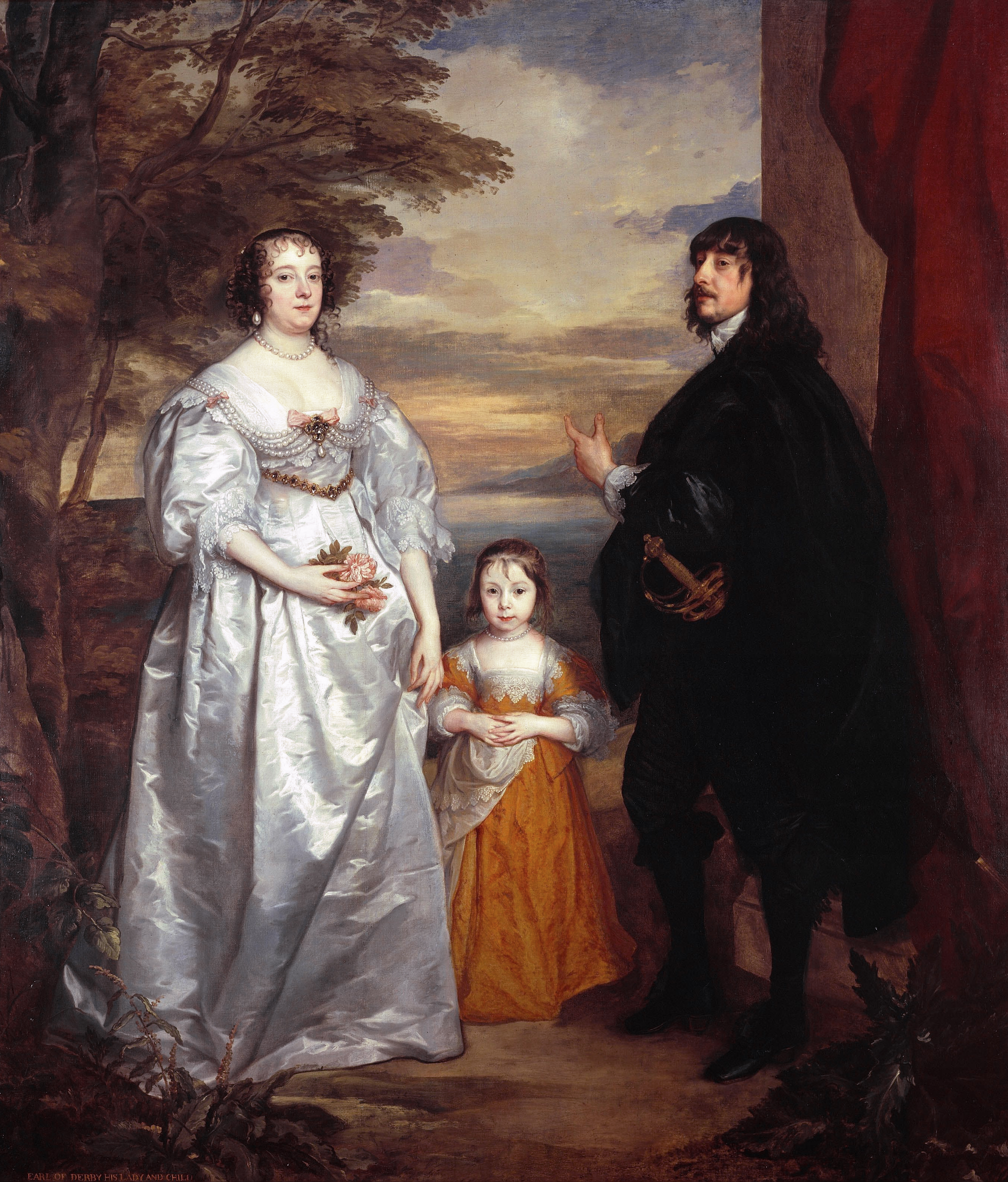
James Stanley, 7th Earl of Derby with his wife Charlotte de La Trémoille and one of their daughters. Painting by van Dyck, circa 1631–1641

On 26 June 1626 he married Charlotte de La Trémoille (1599–1664), a daughter of Claude de La Trémoille, duc de Thouars by his wife Countess Charlotte Brabantina of Nassau. Her maternal grandparents were William I, Prince of Orange (1533–1584), founder of the House of Orange-Nassau and ancestor of the monarchy of the Netherlands, whose wife was Charlotte de Bourbon, a daughter of Louis de Bourbon, Duke of Montpensier. Lady Strange was naturalised by Act of Parliament in 1629.

They had six sons and four daughters, three of whom died young and two of whom died unmarried:

=== Sons ===
- Charles Stanley, 8th Earl of Derby, 2nd Baron Strange (1628–1672), eldest son and heir, who had two sons:
  - William Stanley, 9th Earl of Derby, 3rd Baron Strange (c. 1655–1702), eldest son, who left only female children who inherited the barony of Strange;
  - James Stanley, 10th Earl of Derby, 6th Baron Strange (1664–1736), who having inherited the earldom from his brother and the barony of Strange from his brother's descendant Henrietta Ashburnham, 5th Baroness Strange (d. 1732), died childless, when the barony of Strange passed to James Murray, 2nd Duke of Atholl, 7th Baron Strange (1690–1764), the grandson of his sister Amelia Stanley, and the earldom of Derby passed to his cousin Edward Stanley, 11th Earl of Derby (1689–1776), a descendant of Thomas Stanley, 1st Earl of Derby. The present Earl of Derby is his descendant.
- Edward Stanley (7 January 1639 – October 1664), died unmarried;
- William Stanley (18 October 1640 – 25 October 1670), died unmarried;
- John Stanley (4 November 1641 – 10 September 1719), married a commoner Alice Biddle;
- two sons (died young)

=== Daughters ===
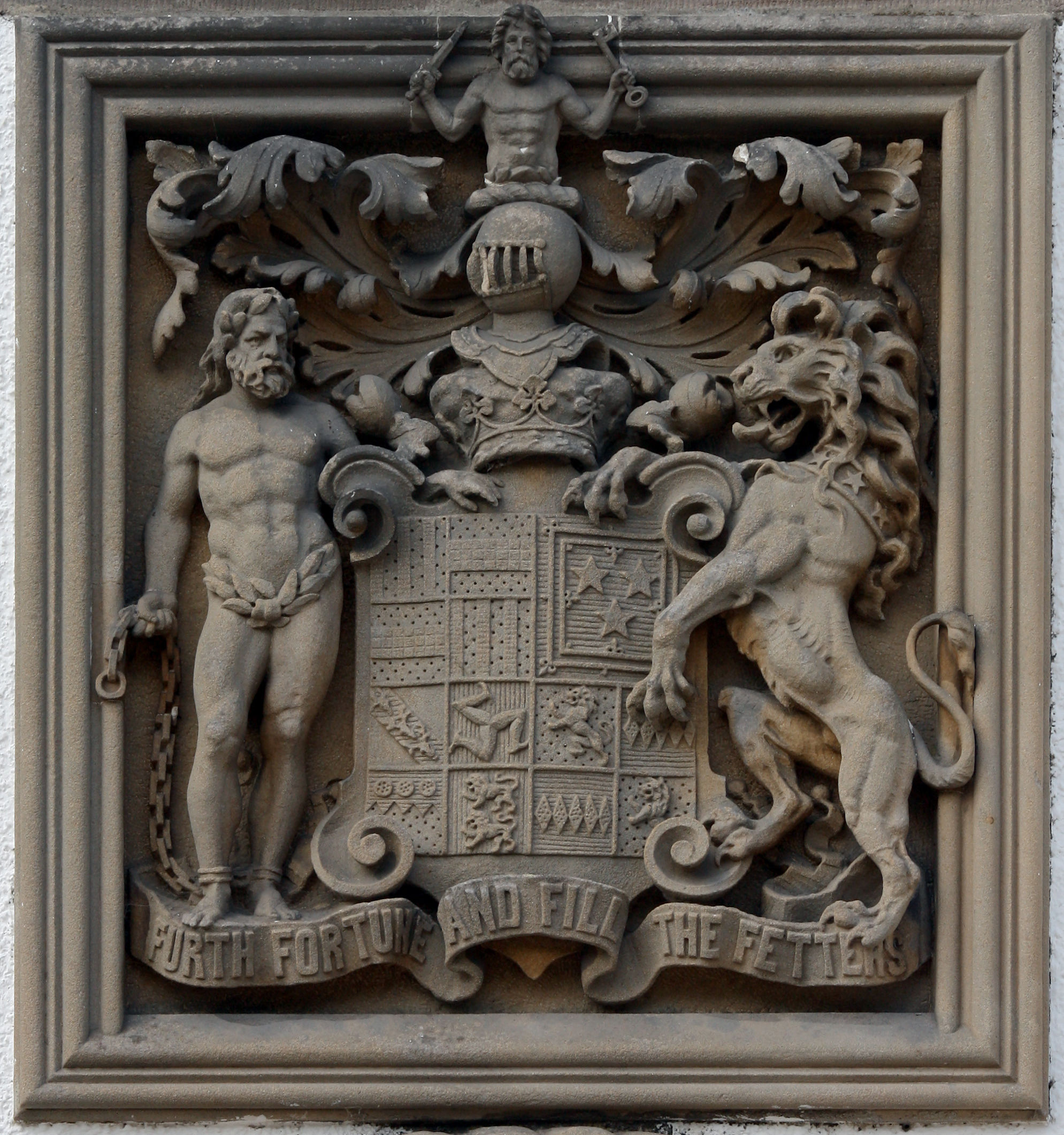
Coat of arms of Murray, Dukes of Athol, at Blair Castle. The 3rd grand quarter displays Stanley quartering Lord of Man, Lathom and Strange

- Charlotte Stanley (died young)
- Henriette Stanley (17 November 1630 – 27 December 1685), who married William Wentworth, 2nd Earl of Strafford, but died childless;
- Amelia Stanley (1633 – 22 February 1702/3), who married John Murray, 1st Marquess of Atholl. She was, in her issue, heiress of her father's Barony of Strange, which as it was deemed (like that created in 1299) to have been created by writ, was able to pass to females. In 1736 the title passed to her grandson James Murray, 2nd Duke of Atholl. Today the Dukes of Atholl still quarter the arms of Stanley, Strange of Knockyn and the arms of the Lord of Man.
- Catherine Stanley, who married Henry Pierrepont, 1st Marquess of Dorchester, but died childless

== Character ==
Lord Derby was a man of deep religious feeling and of great nobility of character, who though unsuccessful in battle, served the king's cause with single-minded purpose and without expectation of reward. His political usefulness was handicapped in the later stages of the struggle by his dislike of the Scots, whom he regarded as guilty of the death of Charles I and as unfit instruments of the Restoration. According to Clarendon he was "a man of great honour and clear courage", and his defects "the result of too little knowledge of the world".

== Literary works ==
Lord Derby left in manuscript A Discourse Concerning the Government of the Isle of Man (later printed in the Stanley Papers and in Francis Peck's Desiderata Curiosa, vol. ii.) and several volumes of historical collections, observations and devotions (Stanley Papers) and a commonplace book.

== Notes ==
Political offices
Preceded by The Earl of Derby	Lord Lieutenant of Cheshire and Lancashire; 1607–1642; With: The Earl of Derby	English Interregnum
Preceded by The Earl of Derby	Vice-Admiral of Cheshire and Lancashire; 1638	English Interregnum
Head of State of the Isle of Man
Preceded by Elizabeth de Vere, Countess of Derby	Lord of Mann; 1627–1651	Succeeded by Thomas Fairfax
Peerage of England
Preceded by William Stanley	Earl of Derby; 1642–1651	Succeeded by Charles Stanley
New creation	Baron Strange; 1628–1651	Succeeded by Charles Stanley
