= Charles Stanley, 8th Earl of Derby =

English noble and politician (1628–1672)

The Earl of Derby
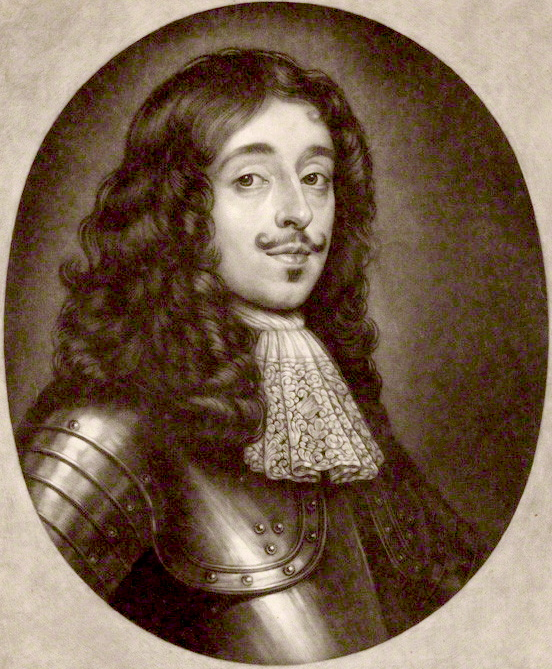
- Tenure: 1651–1672
- Born: 19 January 1628
- Died: 21 December 1672 (aged 44)
- Locality: Liverpool
- Spouse: Dorothea Helena Kirkhoven
- Issue: William Stanley, 9th Earl of Derby; James Stanley, 10th Earl of Derby
- Father: James Stanley, 7th Earl of Derby
- Mother: Charlotte de La Trémouille

Charles Stanley, 8th Earl of Derby, 2nd Baron Strange (19 January 1628 – 21 December 1672), was an English nobleman and politician. He was the eldest son of James Stanley, 7th Earl of Derby and Charlotte de La Trémouille.

== Life ==
As Lord Strange, he took little part in the English Civil War. In France at the time of his father's condemnation in 1651, he petitioned unsuccessfully for the latter's life. After succeeding to the Earldom, he lived quietly at Bidston Hall, Cheshire, emerging to support Booth's unsuccessful rising in 1659. Attainted for so doing, he was restored the following year and the family's lands in the Isle of Man were returned to him.

He served as mayor of Liverpool, between 1666 and 1667.

== Marriage and children ==
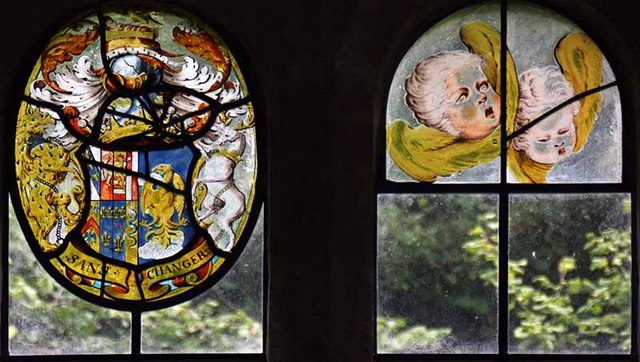
Arms of Stanley impaling Kirkhoven, representing the marriage of the 8th Earl of Derby, St Paul's Church, Witherslack, Cumbria

In 1650, he married Dorothea Helena Kirkhoven (died 1674), daughter of Jehan, Lord of Heenvliet of Holland; he was one of the diplomats involved in negotiating the marriage between William II, Prince of Orange and Mary, Princess Royal, daughter of King Charles I, future parents of King William III of England. Dorothea's mother was Katherine Wotton, widow of Henry Stanhope, Lord Stanhope (d. 1634), 2nd surviving son of Philip Stanhope, 1st Earl of Chesterfield and the elder daughter of Thomas Wotton, 2nd Baron Wotton by his wife Mary Throckmorton, a daughter of Sir Arthur Throckmorton of Paulerspury, Northamptonshire.

They had two sons:

- William Stanley, 9th Earl of Derby (c. 1655–1702), elder son and heir, who married Lady Elizabeth Butler and had two daughters but no sons
- James Stanley, 10th Earl of Derby (1664–1736), younger son, who married Mary Morley and had one child, who died in infancy; James succeeded his elder brother in the earldom.

In 1660, Dorothea, who had her father's Netherlands nationality, was naturalised as English by Act of Parliament.

Honorary titles
English Interregnum	Vice-Admiral of Cheshire; 1661–1672	Vacant Title next held by The Earl of Derby
English Interregnum	Vice-Admiral of Lancashire; 1661–1672	Succeeded by William Banks
English Interregnum	Lord Lieutenant of Cheshire jointly with The Lord Brereton 1662–1664 and Lancashire; 1660–1672	Succeeded by The Earl of Bridgewater
Peerage of England
Preceded by James Stanley	Earl of Derby; 1651–1672	Succeeded by William Stanley
Head of State of the Isle of Man
Preceded by Thomas Fairfax	Lord of Mann; 1660–1672	Succeeded by William II Stanley
