= Lord Lieutenant of Cheshire =

List of people who have served as Lord Lieutenant of the County Palatine of Chester

This is a list of people who have served as Lord Lieutenant of the County Palatine of Chester. Since 1689, all Lords Lieutenant have also been Custos Rotulorum of Cheshire.

== Lord Lieutenants of Cheshire ==
Lord Lieutenant	From	Until
Edward Stanley, 3rd Earl of Derby	1569	1572
Henry Stanley, 4th Earl of Derby	1572	25 September 1593
vacant
William Stanley, 6th Earl of Derby jointly with James Stanley, 7th Earl of Derby	21 December 1607; 12 December 1626	1642; 1642
William Fiennes, 1st Viscount Saye and Sele	1642 (Parliamentarian)	
Interregnum 1649–1660
Charles Stanley, 8th Earl of Derby jointly with William Brereton, 2nd Baron Brereton	30 July 1660; 19 July 1662	21 December 1672; April 1664
John Egerton, 2nd Earl of Bridgewater	24 January 1673	1676
William Stanley, 9th Earl of Derby	11 May 1676	8 August 1687
William Herbert, 1st Marquess of Powis	28 February 1688	1688
William Stanley, 9th Earl of Derby	17 October 1688	23 December 1688
Henry Booth, 1st Earl of Warrington	12 April 1689	2 January 1694
vacant 1694–1695
Richard Savage, 4th Earl Rivers	11 May 1695	1703
Hugh Cholmondeley, 1st Earl of Cholmondeley	16 June 1703	April 1713
Other Windsor, 2nd Earl of Plymouth	4 September 1713	1714
Hugh Cholmondeley, 1st Earl of Cholmondeley	21 October 1714	18 January 1725
George Cholmondeley, 2nd Earl of Cholmondeley	7 April 1725	7 May 1733
George Cholmondeley, 3rd Earl of Cholmondeley	14 June 1733	10 June 1770
George Cholmondeley, 4th Earl of Cholmondeley	19 July 1770	May 1783
George Harry Grey, 5th Earl of Stamford	29 May 1783	23 May 1819
George Harry Grey, 6th Earl of Stamford	24 June 1819	26 April 1845
Richard Grosvenor, 2nd Marquess of Westminster	20 May 1845	1867
William Egerton, 1st Baron Egerton	29 January 1868	21 February 1883
Hugh Grosvenor, 1st Duke of Westminster	31 March 1883	22 December 1899
Wilbraham Egerton, 1st Earl Egerton	19 March 1900	1905
Hugh Grosvenor, 2nd Duke of Westminster	19 December 1905	1920
Sir William Bromley-Davenport	15 April 1920	1949
Philip Lever, 3rd Viscount Leverhulme	6 September 1949	1990
William Arthur Bromley-Davenport	2 August 1990	7 March 2010
Thomas Briggs	7 March 2010	25 August 2021
Alexis, Lady Redmond	25 August 2021	Present

== Vice Lieutenants ==
- Alan Egerton, 3rd Baron Egerton 11 January 1902
- Sir George Dixon 15 December 1920

== Deputy Lieutenants ==
- Thomas, Lord Newton 23 February 1901
- Colonel Sir Edward Cotton-Jodrell 23 February 1901
