= Claude de La Trémoille, 2nd Duke of Thouars =

French nobleman

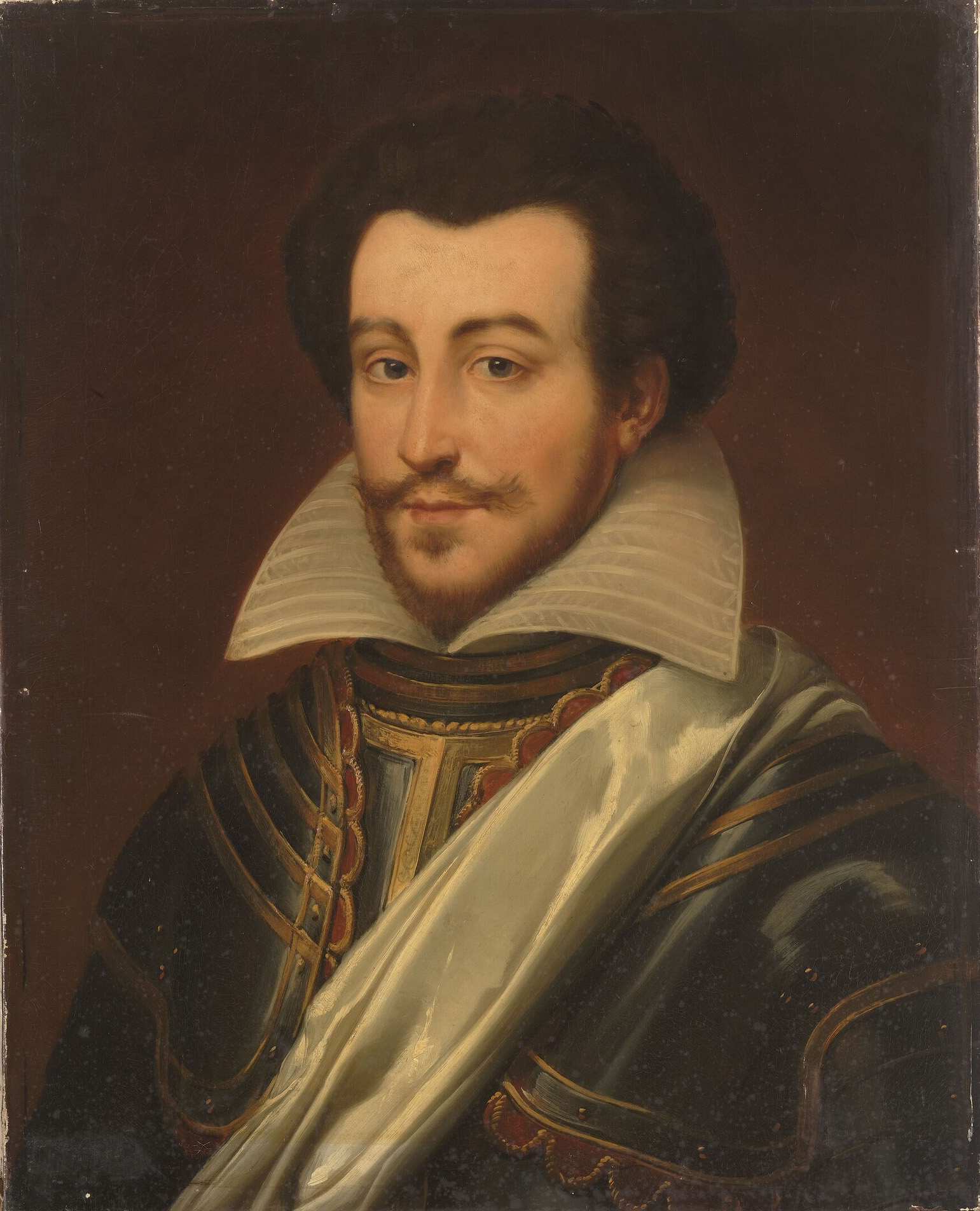
Claude de La Trémoille

Claude de La Trémoille, 2nd Duke of Thouars (1566 – 25 October 1604) was a sixteenth-century French nobleman of the La Tremoille family. He was the son of Louis III de La Trémoille and his wife, Jeanne de Montmorency.

King Henry IV of France had been friendly with La Trémoille when he was King of Navarre, but kept him in a subordinate position once he became King of France, preferring La Trémoille's cousin, Henry de La Tour d'Auvergne, the Viscount of Turenne. In 1587, La Trémoille converted to Protestantism. He fought for Henry IV at the battle of Coutras and also at Ivry, and was rewarded by elevation to the peerage, as Duke of Thouars, in 1595. This new title, however, made La Trémoille lose more money than it earned him. In 1598, Turenne proposed to his sister-in-law Charlotte-Brabantine to marry La Trémoille. Thanks to her relations with the houses of Orange and Bouillon, Charlotte-Brabantine played an important part in the French Protestant diplomacy. They had four children: Henry (1598–1674); Charlotte (1599–1664), who married James Stanley, Earl of Derby; Élisabeth (1601–1604) and Frédéric (1602–1642) comte de Laval.

In 1602, Charlotte-Brabantine dissuaded her husband from engaging in the conspiracy of Biron and encouraged him to lend allegiance to the king. He died in 1604.

Claude de La Trémoille, 2nd Duke of Thouars House of La Trémoille Born: 1566 Died: 25 October 1604
French nobility
Preceded by Louis III de La Trémoille	Duc de Thouars; 25 March 1577 – 25 October 1604	Succeeded by Henri de La Trémoille
