= Charles Gerard, 2nd Earl of Macclesfield =

English politician

Charles Gerard, 2nd Earl of Macclesfield (c. 1659 – 5 November 1701), was an English peer, soldier and MP.

== Biography ==
He was born in France, the eldest son of Charles Gerard, Baron Brandon (later 1st Earl of Macclesfield), and Jeanne, the daughter of Pierre de Civelle, equerry to Queen Henrietta Maria. He became an English national by Act of Parliament in 1677.

By 1678 he was a lieutenant-colonel in Lord Gerard's Horse and a full colonel in 1679. That year he entered politics, being elected knight of the shire for Lancashire in both March and October, and again in 1681.

Like his father Charles, the 1st Earl, he was involved in the intrigues of the Duke of Monmouth. In 1685 he was sentenced to death for being a party to the Rye House Plot, but was pardoned by Charles II. In 1689 he was re-elected Member of Parliament for Lancashire, which he represented until 1694, when he succeeded to his father's peerage. He was Custos Rotulorum for Lancashire from 1689 until his death in 1701. As Lord Lieutenant of Denbighshire he was also Colonel of the Denbighshire Militia in 1697.

Having become a major-general in 1694, Macclesfield saw some service abroad, and in 1701 he was selected the first commissioner for the investiture of the elector of Hanover (afterwards King George I) with the order of the Garter, on which occasion he also was charged to present a copy of the Act of Settlement to the dowager electress Sophia.

He died suddenly on 5 November 1701 at about 40 years old, leaving no legitimate children.

== Family ==
In March 1698, Macclesfield was divorced from his wife Anna, daughter of Sir Richard Mason of Sutton, by Act of Parliament; the first occasion on which a divorce was so granted without a previous decree of an ecclesiastical court. The countess was the mother of two children who were known by the name of Savage, and whose reputed father was Richard Savage, 4th Earl Rivers. The poet Richard Savage claimed that he was the younger of these children. The divorced countess married Colonel Henry Brett about the year 1700, and died at the age of eighty-five in 1753. Her daughter, Anna Margaretta Brett, was a mistress of George I. The 2nd earl of Macclesfield was succeeded by his brother Fitton Gerard, 3rd Earl (c. 1665–1702), on whose death without heirs the title became extinct in December 1702.

On his death, Macclesfield left most of his estate to Charles Mohun, 4th Baron Mohun. In 1691 Mohun married Charlotte Orby, a granddaughter of Charles, 1st Earl of Macclesfield. Although they were soon separated, in 1694 Mohun accompanied Macclesfield on the Brest expedition. James Douglas, 4th Duke of Hamilton also had a claim on the estate through his second wife Elizabeth Gerard, who was also a granddaughter of the 1st Earl. It seems that Macclesfield preferred Mohun, a former captain of horse in his regiment, over Hamilton whom he disliked because of his Tory sympathies. Hamilton challenged Mohun through the courts. After over a decade of legal dispute, the pair fought their famous duel in Hyde Park, which resulted in the deaths of both men.

== Notes ==
Parliament of England
Preceded by Roger Bradshaigh; Thomas Preston	Member of Parliament for Lancashire; 1679; With: Peter Bold	Succeeded by Peter Bold; Charles Hoghton
Preceded by James Holt; Roger Bradshaigh	Member of Parliament for Lancashire; 1689–1694; With: Charles Hoghton 1689–1690; James Stanley 1690–1694	Succeeded by James Stanley; Sir Ralph Assheton, Bt
Honorary titles
Preceded by The Earl of Derby	Lord Lieutenant of Lancashire; 1689–1701	Succeeded by The Earl Rivers
Preceded by The Earl of Derby	Vice-Admiral of Cheshire and Lancashire; 1691–1701	Succeeded by The Earl Rivers
Preceded by The Duke of Shrewsbury	Lord Lieutenant of North Wales (Anglesey, Caernarvonshire, Denbighshire, Flintshire, Merionethshire and Montgomeryshire); 1696–1701	Succeeded by The Earl of Derby
Preceded by Andrew Newport	Custos Rotulorum of Montgomeryshire; 1700–1701	Succeeded by Viscount Newport
Peerage of England
Preceded by Charles Gerard	Earl of Macclesfield; 1694–1701	Succeeded by Fitton Gerard
