= James Stanley, 10th Earl of Derby =

British peer, soldier and politician

The Right Honourable The Earl of Derby PC
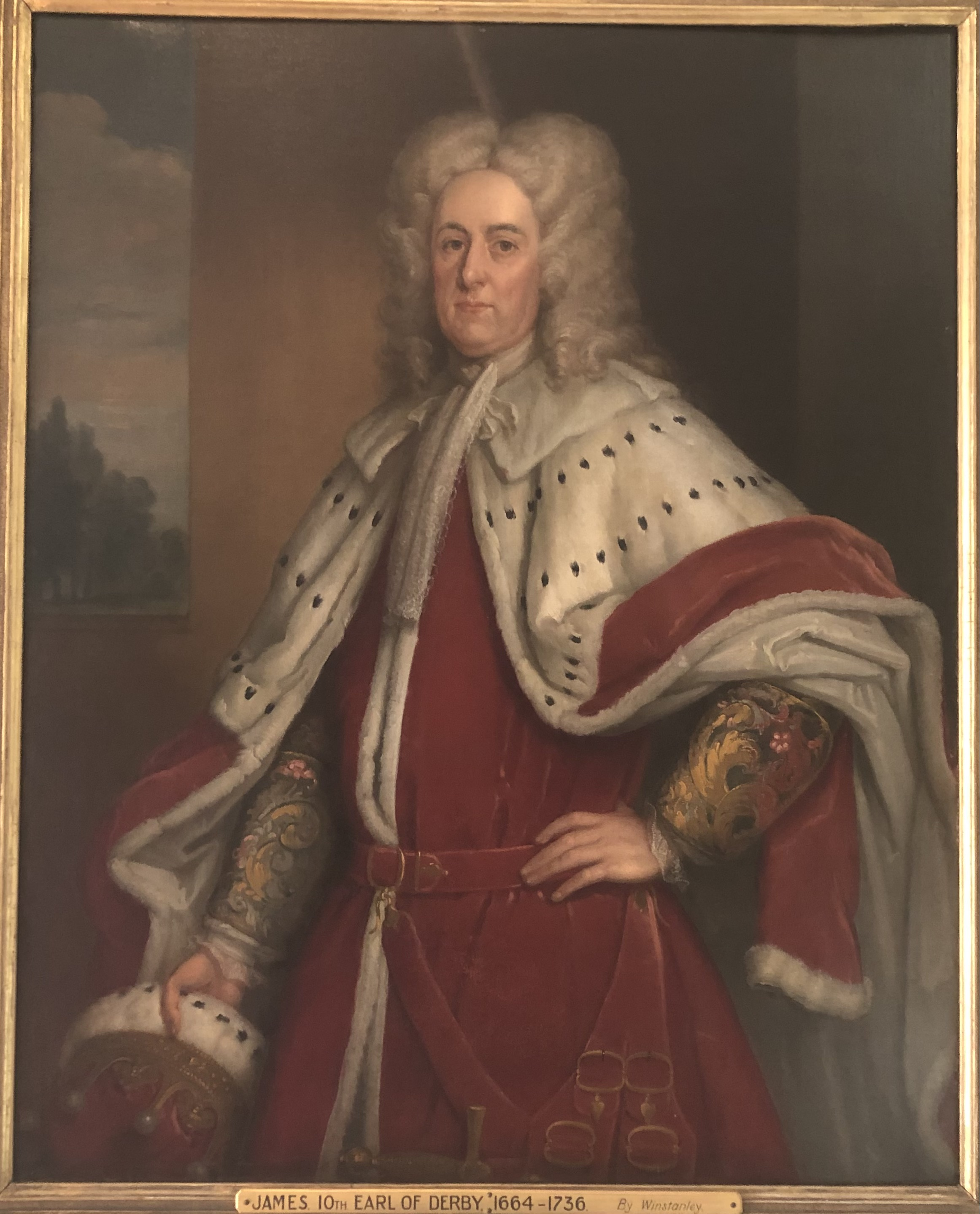

Captain of the Yeomen of the Guard
- In office 1715–1723
- Preceded by: The Lord Paget
- Succeeded by: Lord Stanhope

Personal details
- Born: 3 July 1664
- Died: 1 February 1736 (aged 71)
- Spouse: Mary Morley
- Parent(s): Charles Stanley, 8th Earl of Derby; Dorothea Helena Kirkhoven

James Stanley, 10th Earl of Derby PC (3 July 1664 – 1 February 1736), styled The Honourable until 1702, was a British peer, soldier and politician. He became Captain of the Yeomen of the Guard and served in the Anglo-Dutch Brigade.

== Early life ==
Derby was the second son of Charles Stanley, 8th Earl of Derby, and Dorothea Helena Kirkhoven, born on 3 July 1664. He was elected to the House of Commons for Clitheroe in 1685, a seat he held until 1689, and then represented Preston from 1689 to 1690 and Lancashire from 1695 to 1702. He held the post of Groom of the Bedchamber to King William III from 1689 to 1702.

== Military career ==
Having served in the Anglo-Dutch Brigade with William III in Holland and Flanders (1686–88), he was commissioned as a captain and Lieutenant-Colonel in the 1st Foot Guards on 11 April 1689. When his elder brother, the 9th Earl of Derby, as Lord Lieutenant of Lancashire was ordered to call out the Lancashire Militia, Lt-Col James Stanley commanded the brigade (three regiments of foot and three troops of horse) in the subsequent campaign in Ireland in 1690–91.

When the Lancashire Militia returned home to be disembodied at the end of the campaign, and Stanley was ordered to Flanders to join Colonel Hodges' Regiment as second-in-command, he induced a large number of his militiamen to volunteer to fill vacancies in the regiment. After Col Hodges was killed at the Battle of Steenkerque in 1692, Stanley succeeded to the command, and the regiment became 'Stanleys' (later the Bedfordshire and Hertfordshire Regiment). He remained its colonel until 1705. He was promoted to major general in 1704.

== Political career ==
In 1702, he succeeded his elder brother as 10th Earl of Derby and entered the House of Lords. In 1732, he succeeded his great-niece as sixth Baron Strange. Derby was admitted to the Privy Council in 1706 and appointed Chancellor of the Duchy of Lancaster, a position he retained until 1710, and was later Captain of the Yeomen of the Guard from 1715 to 1723. He also served as Lord Lieutenant of Lancashire during 1702–1710 and 1714–1736.

== Family life ==
In February 1705 he married Mary Morley, only daughter of Sir William Morley of Halnaker and his second wife Anne Denham, daughter of the celebrated poet Sir John Denham and his first wife Anne Cotton. He died on 1 February 1736, aged 68, without surviving issue (his only son, William, born 31 January 1710, died on 4 March following). The Earl was succeeded in the earldom by his distant relative Edward Stanley, 11th Earl of Derby. The barony of Strange and lordship of the Isle of Man ('Lord of Mann') passed on to his first cousin once removed, James Murray, 2nd Duke of Atholl (His grand-mother was Amelia Stanley). Lady Derby died on 29 March 1752.

== Notes ==
Parliament of England
Preceded by Sir Thomas Stringer; Henry Marsden	Member of Parliament for Clitheroe; 1685–1689; With: Edmund Assheton	Succeeded by Christopher Wilkinson; Anthony Parker
Preceded by Edward Fleetwood; Hon. Andrew Newport	Member of Parliament for Preston; 1689–1690; With: Thomas Patten	Succeeded by Lord Willoughby de Eresby; Christopher Greenfield
Preceded by Viscount Brandon; Sir Charles Hoghton	Member of Parliament for Lancashire; 1690–1702; With: Viscount Brandon 1690–1694; Sir Ralph Assheton 1694–1698; Fitton Gerard 1698–1701; Richard Bold 1701–1702	Succeeded by Richard Bold; Richard Assheton
Political offices
Preceded by The Lord Gower	Chancellor of the Duchy of Lancaster; 1706–1710	Succeeded by The Lord Berkeley of Stratton
Preceded by The Lord Paget	Captain of the Yeomen of the Guard; 1715–1723	Succeeded by Lord Stanhope
Honorary titles
Preceded by The Earl Rivers	Lord Lieutenant of Lancashire; 1702–1710	Succeeded by The Duke of Hamilton
Preceded by The Earl Rivers	Vice-Admiral of Lancashire; 1702–1712	Succeeded by The Duke of Hamilton
Vacant Title last held by The Duke of Hamilton	Lord Lieutenant of Lancashire; 1714–1736	Vacant Title next held by The Earl of Derby
Peerage of England
Preceded by William Richard George Stanley	Earl of Derby; 1702–1736	Succeeded by Edward Stanley
Preceded by Henrietta Ashburnham	Baron Strange; 1732–1736	Succeeded by James Murray
Head of State of the Isle of Man
Preceded by William Stanley	Lord of Mann; 1702–1736	Succeeded by James Murray
