= Lord Lieutenant of Lancashire =

Agent of the British Crown

This is a list of people who have served as Lord Lieutenant of Lancashire. The Lord Lieutenant is the King's personal representative in each county of the United Kingdom. Historically the Lord Lieutenant was responsible for organising the county's militia, but it is today a largely ceremonial position, usually awarded to a retired notable, military officer, nobleman, or businessman in the county.

The current office-holder is Amanda Parker of Browsholme Hall, the first woman to ever have been appointed to the position.

== Lords Lieutenant ==
Lord Lieutenant	From	Until
Robert Radclyffe, 1st Earl of Sussex	1537	1542
Edward Stanley, 3rd Earl of Derby	1552	1572
Henry Stanley, 4th Earl of Derby	1572	25 September 1593
vacant
William Stanley, 6th Earl of Derby jointly with James Stanley, Lord Strange	21 December 1607; 12 December 1626	1642; 1642
Interregnum 1649–1660
Charles Stanley, 8th Earl of Derby	30 July 1660	21 December 1672
John Egerton, 2nd Earl of Bridgewater	24 January 1673	11 May 1676
William Stanley, 9th Earl of Derby	11 May 1676	13 September 1687
Caryll Molyneux, 3rd Viscount Molyneux	13 September 1687	25 October 1688
William Stanley, 9th Earl of Derby	25 October 1688	13 May 1689
Charles Gerard, 2nd Earl of Macclesfield	13 May 1689	5 November 1701
Richard Savage, 4th Earl Rivers	15 January 1702	18 June 1702
William Stanley, 9th Earl of Derby	18 June 1702	5 November 1702
James Stanley, 10th Earl of Derby	19 December 1702	29 November 1710
James Hamilton, 4th Duke of Hamilton	29 November 1710	15 November 1712
vacant 1712–1714
James Stanley, 10th Earl of Derby	19 August 1714	1 February 1736
vacant 1733–1742
Edward Stanley, 11th Earl of Derby	13 March 1742	22 July 1757
James Stanley, Lord Strange	22 July 1757	1 June 1771
Edward Stanley, 11th Earl of Derby	22 July 1771	22 February 1776
Edward Smith-Stanley, 12th Earl of Derby	14 March 1776	21 October 1834
Edward Smith-Stanley, 13th Earl of Derby	15 November 1834	30 June 1851
Charles Molyneux, 3rd Earl of Sefton	3 September 1851	2 August 1855
Francis Egerton, 1st Earl of Ellesmere	15 October 1855	18 February 1857
William Cavendish, 2nd Earl of Burlington	28 March 1857	20 February 1858
William Molyneux, 4th Earl of Sefton	20 February 1858	27 June 1897
Frederick Stanley, 16th Earl of Derby	30 July 1897	14 June 1908
Ughtred Kay-Shuttleworth, 1st Baron Shuttleworth	14 July 1908	29 March 1928
Edward Stanley, 17th Earl of Derby	29 March 1928	4 February 1948
Arthur Peel, 2nd Earl Peel	19 April 1948	22 January 1951
Edward Stanley, 18th Earl of Derby	22 January 1951	13 September 1968
Hervey Rhodes, Baron Rhodes	13 September 1968	13 August 1971
Ralph Assheton, 1st Baron Clitheroe	13 August 1971	March 1976
Sir Simon Towneley	March 1976	13 January 1997
Charles Kay-Shuttleworth, 5th Baron Shuttleworth	13 January 1997	2 August 2023
Amanda Parker	2 August 2023	present

== Deputy lieutenants ==
A deputy lieutenant of Lancashire is commissioned by the Lord Lieutenant of Lancashire. Deputy lieutenants support the work of the lord-lieutenant. There can be several deputy lieutenants at any time, depending on the population of the county. Their appointment does not terminate with the changing of the lord-lieutenant, but they usually retire at age 75.

=== 18th Century ===
- 19 November 1791: Thomas Townley Parker
- 19 November 1791: William Farrington

=== 19th Century ===
- 28 November 1826: Le Gendre Nicholas Starkie
- 28 November 1826: Charles Towneley
- 28 November 1826: Peregrine Edward Towneley
- 10 May 1834: John Towneley
- 19 November 1847: James Heywood
- 10 April 1888: Sir John Hardy Thursby

=== 20th Century ===
- 2 November 1935: Leonard Green

=== 21st Century ===
- 27 January 2012 : Bill Beaumont
- 5 October 2023 : Miranda Carruthers-Watt

As of April 2025 there are 42 deputy lieutenants of Lancashire, including Bill Beaumont, Edwin J. Booth, John Cater, and Charles Hadcock, Thomas Woodcock: a full list is available on the Lancashire Lieutenancy website. They include

== Sources ==
- J.C. Sainty (1970). "Lieutenancies of Counties, 1585–1642". Bulletin of the Institute of Historical Research (Special Supplement No. 8): 13–14.
- J.C. Sainty (1979). List of Lieutenants of Counties of England and Wales 1660-1974. London: Swift Printers (Sales) Ltd.
- Leigh Rayment's Peerage Pages
- The Lord-Lieutenant of Lancashire, Lancashire County Council
