= William Stanley, 9th Earl of Derby =

English earl

The Right Honourable The Earl of Derby
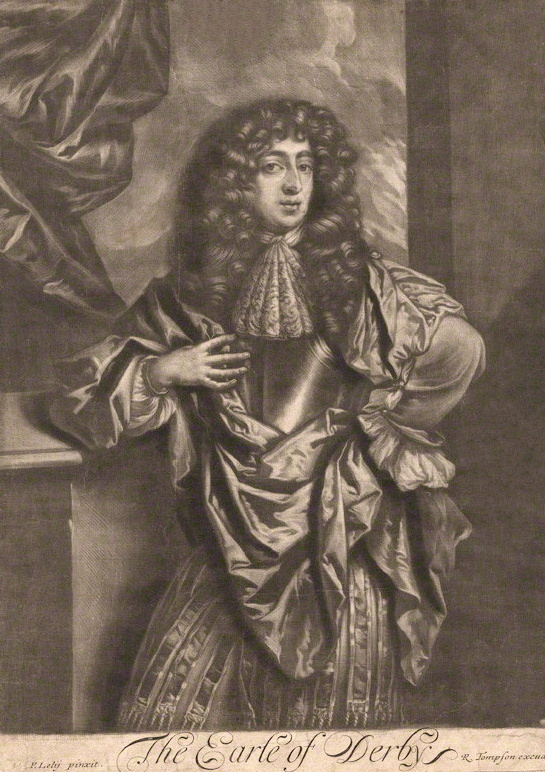
- William Stanley, the 9th Earl of Derby
- Tenure: 1672–1702
- Born: 1655
- Died: 5 November 1702 (aged 46–47)
- Locality: Lancashire, Cheshire
- Spouse: Lady Elizabeth Butler
- Issue: James Stanley, Lord Strange
- Father: Charles Stanley, 8th Earl of Derby
- Mother: Dorotha Helena Kirkhoven

William Richard George Stanley, 9th Earl of Derby (c. 1655 – 5 November 1702), styled Lord Strange from 1655 to 1672, was an English peer and politician.

Derby was the eldest son of Charles Stanley, 8th Earl of Derby, and Dorotha Helena Kirkhoven.

He succeeded his father in the earldom in 1672 and later served as Lord Lieutenant of Lancashire from 1676 to 1687 and again from 1688 to 1701 and of Cheshire from 1676 to 1687. In 1685, Derby petitioned the House of Lords for the restoration of some of the family estates that had been confiscated from his father, including the manors of Hawarden, Bidston, and Broughton, Lancashire.

Following the Glorious Revolution in which King William III supplanted James II, Derby was ordered as Lord Lieutenant of Lancashire to call out the Lancashire Militia in 1689. He raised three regiments of foot and three troops of horse, and was appointed Colonel of the first regiment. However, his younger brother, James, a professional soldier, actually commanded the Lancashire Brigade during the campaign in Ireland.

Lord Derby married Lady Elizabeth Butler, daughter of Thomas Butler, Earl of Ossory, in 1673. His only son James Stanley, Lord Strange, predeceased him.

On his death on 5 November 1702, his junior title of Baron Strange fell into abeyance between his two daughters (it was later called out abeyance in favour of the eldest daughter, Henrietta). He was succeeded in the earldom by his younger brother James Stanley, 10th Earl of Derby. Lady Derby died on 5 July 1717.

== Notes ==
Honorary titles
| Preceded by The Earl of Bridgewater | Lord Lieutenant of Lancashire; 1676–1687 | Succeeded by The Viscount Molyneux |
| Preceded by The Earl of Bridgewater | Lord Lieutenant of Cheshire; 1676–1687 | Succeeded by The Marquess of Powis |
| Preceded by Henry Booth | Custos Rotulorum of Cheshire; 1682–1687 | Succeeded by The Marquess of Powis |
| Vacant Title last held by William Bankes | Vice-Admiral of Cheshire and Lancashire; 1684–1691 | Succeeded by Viscount Brandon |
| Vacant Title last held by The Earl of Derby | Vice-Admiral of Cheshire and Lancashire; 1684–1691 | Succeeded by Viscount Brandon |
| Preceded by The Viscount Molyneux | Lord Lieutenant of Lancashire; 1688–1689 | Succeeded by Viscount Brandon |
| Preceded by The Marquess of Powis | Lord Lieutenant of Cheshire; 1688–1689 | Succeeded by The Lord Delamer |
| Preceded by The Earl Rivers | Lord Lieutenant of Lancashire; 1702 | Succeeded by The Earl of Derby |
| Preceded by The Earl of Macclesfield | Lord Lieutenant of North Wales (Anglesey, Caernarvonshire, Denbighshire, Flintshire, Merionethshire and Montgomeryshire); 1702 | Succeeded by The Viscount Cholmondeley |
Head of State of the Isle of Man
| Preceded by Charles Stanley | Lord of Mann; 1672–1702 | Succeeded by James Stanley |
Peerage of England
| Preceded by Charles Stanley | Earl of Derby; 1672–1702 | Succeeded by James Stanley |
| Preceded by Charles Stanley | Baron Strange; 1672–1702 | In abeyance Title next held by Henrietta Stanley |
