= Baron Mohun =

The title Baron Mohun was created once in the Peerage of England. On 6 February 1299 John de Mohun was summoned to parliament. On the death of the second baron, the barony fell into abeyance. In 1431, Richard le Strange, 7th Baron Strange (second creation) became sole heir of the barony of Mohun; both these titles became abeyant on the death of Ferdinando Stanley, 5th Earl of Derby in 1594.

== Barons Mohun (1299) ==
- John de Mohun, 1st Baron Mohun (d. 1330)
- John de Mohun, 2nd Baron Mohun (c. 1320–1375) abeyant 1375
- Richard le Strange, 3rd Baron Mohun (1381–1449) sole heir 1431
- for further barons look at Baron Strange (second creation) until 1594.

== Family tree ==
Family tree of Dukes, Marquesses, and Earls of Atholl

John Lestrange III d. 1269
Baron Strange (1st creation), of Salop, 1295
John Lestrange IV d. 1276	Roger le Strange d. 1311; 1st Baron Strange of Salop
Baron Strange (1st creation), of Salop extinct, 1311
Baron Strange (2nd creation), of Knockyn, 1295
John Le Strange V d. 1309; 1st Baron Strange of Knockyn
Baron Mohun of Dunster, 1299
John Le Strange VI c. 1282–1311; 2nd Baron Strange of Knockyn	John de Mohun d. 1330; 1st Baron Mohun
John Le Strange c. 1297–1323; 3rd Baron Strange of Knockyn	Roger Le Strange; 1301–1349; 4th Baron Strange of Knockyn	John de Mohun d. 1322
Earl of Atholl (4th creation), 1367
Roger Le Strange c. 1327–1382; 5th Baron Strange of Knockyn	John Mohun; 1320–1376; 2nd Baron Mohun	Robert Stewart; 1316–1390; 1st Earl of Atholl, Earl of Strathearn, Later Robert II, King of Scots
Earl of Atholl (6th creation), 1403	Earl of Atholl (7th creation), 1404
John Beaufort c. 1373–1410; Earl of Somerset	John Le Strange c. 1350–1397; 6th Baron Strange of Knockyn	Maud Mohun	John Stewart c. 1337–1406; 2nd Earl of Atholl, Earl of Carrick, Later Robert III, King of Scots	Robert Stewart; 1340–1420; Duke of Albany, Earl of Atholl	Walter Stewart c. 1360–1437; Earl of Atholl, Earl of Strathearn, Earl of Caithness
Earldom of Atholl (4th creation) merged in the crown, 1390	Earldom of Atholl (6th creation) expired, 1406	Earldom of Atholl (7th creation) attainted, 1404
Baron Stanley, 1456	Earl of Atholl (5th creation), 1398
John Beaufort; 1401–1444; Duke of Somerset	Thomas Stanley c. 1405–1459; 1st Baron Stanley, King of Mann	Richard Le Strange; 1381–1449; 7th Baron Strange of Knockyn, 3rd Baron Mohun	James Stewart "Black Knight of Lorn"; 1399–c. 1451	Joan Beaufort c. 1404–1445; Queen of Scots	James I 1394–1437; King of Scots	David Stewart; 1378–1402; Duke of Rothesay, Earl of Atholl, Earl of Carrick
Earldom of Atholl (5th creation) extinct, 1402
Earl of Derby (3rd creation), 1485	Earl of Atholl (8th creation), c. 1457; Lord of Balveny, 1460
Margaret Beaufort; 1443–1509	Thomas Stanley; 1435–1504; 1st Earl of Derby, 2nd Baron Stanley, King of Mann	John Le Strange c. 1440–1477; 8th Baron Strange of Knockyn	Jacquetta Woodville; 1445–1509	Elizabeth Woodville c. 1437–1492	Edward IV; 1442–1483	John Stewart c. 1437–1442–1512; 1st Earl of Atholl
Henry VII; 1457–1509	George Stanley; 1460–1503; 9th Baron Strange of Knockyn suo uxoris	Joan Le Strange c. 1460–1514; 9th Baroness Strange of Knockyn suo jure	John Stewart c. 1480–c. 1521; 2nd Earl of Atholl
Mary Tudor; 1496–1533	Thomas Stanley; 1504–1521; 2nd Earl of Derby, 10th Baron Strange of Knockyn, 3rd Baron Stanley, King of Mann	John Stewart; 1507–1542; 3rd Earl of Atholl
Eleanor Brandon; 1519–1547	Edward Stanley c. 1509–1572; 3rd Earl of Derby, 11th Baron Strange of Knockyn, 4th Baron Stanley, Lord of Mann	John Stewart "the fair" d. 1579; 4th Earl of Atholl
Earl of Atholl (9th creation), 1596	Lord Murray of Tullibardine, 1604, Earl of Tullibardine (1st creation) and Lord Murray, Gask and Balquhidder, 1606
Margaret Clifford; 1540–1596	Henry Stanley; 1531–1593; 4th Earl of Derby, 12th Baron Strange of Knockyn, 5th Baron Stanley, Lord of Mann	John Stewart; 1566–1603; 1st Earl of Atholl, 6th Lord Innermeath	Marie Ruthven (d. after 1605)	John Stewart; 1563–1595; 5th Earl of Atholl	John Murray (c. 1550 – c. 1609); 1st Earl of Tullibardine, Lord Murray of Tullibardine, and Lord Murray, Gask and Balquhidder
Earldom of Atholl (8th creation) extinct, 1595
Earl of Tullibardine (2nd creation), 1628
Ferdinando Stanley; 1559–1594; 5th Earl of Derby, 13th Baron Strange of Knockyn, 6th Baron Stanley, Lord of Mann	William Stanley; 1561–1642; 6th Earl of Derby, Lord of Mann	James Stewart d. 1625; 2nd Earl of Atholl	Dorothea Stewart	William Murray c. 1574–1627; 2nd Earl of Tullibardine, Lord Murray of Tullibardine, and Lord Murray, Gask and Balquhidder	Patrick Murray; 1578–1644; 1st Earl of Tullibardine, Lord Murray of Tullibardine, and Lord Murray, Gask and Balquhidder
Barony of Strange of Knockyn (9th creation) abeyant, 1594	Earldom of Atholl (9th creation) extinct, 1625	Resigned Earldom of Tullibardine and lordships in favour of his brother, 1626
Elizabeth Stanley; 1588–1633
Baron Strange (4th creation), 1628	Earl of Atholl (10th creation), 1629
Ferdinando Hastings; 1608–1655; 6th Earl of Huntingdon and Baron Hastings	James Stanley; 1607–1651; 7th Earl of Derby, 1st Baron Strange (4th creation)	John Murray c. 1610–1642; 1st Earl of Atholl	James Murray; 1617–1670; 2nd Earl of Tullibardine, Lord Murray of Tullibardine, and Lord Murray, Gask and Balquhidder
Marquess of Atholl, Viscount of Balquhidder, and Lord Murray, Balveny and Gask, 1676
Charles Stanley; 1628–1672; 8th Earl of Derby, 2nd Baron Strange (4th creation)	Amelia Ann Sophia Stanley; 1633–1702/03	John Murray; 1631–1703; 1st Marquess of Atholl, 2nd Earl of Atholl, 3rd Earl of Tullibardine, Lord Murray of Tullibardine, and Lord Murray, Gask and Balquhidder
Earl of Tullibardine, Viscount Glenalmond and Lord Murray, 1696 (for life); Duke of Atholl, Marquess of Tullibardine, Earl of Strathtay and Strathardle Viscount of Balwhidder, Glenalmond and Glenlyon, Lord Murray, Balveny and Gask, 1703	Earl of Dunmore, Viscount of Fincastle, Lord Murray of Blair, Moulin and Tillimet, 1686
Theophilus Hastings; 1650–1701; 7th Earl of Huntingdon and Baron Hastings	William Richard George Stanley c. 1655–1702; 9th Earl of Derby, 3rd Baron Strange (4th creation)	James Stanley; 1664–1736; 10th Earl of Derby, 6th Baron Strange (4th creation)	John Murray; 1660–1724; 1st Duke of Atholl, 2nd Marquess of Atholl	Charles Murray; 1661–1710; 1st Earl of Dunmore, Viscount of Fincastle, and Lord Murray of Blair, Moulin and Tillimet
Theophilus Hastings; 1696–1747; 9th Earl of Huntingdon and Baron Hastings	Henrietta Stanley; 1687–1718; 4th Baroness Strange (4th creation)	William Murray; 1689–1746 styled Marquess of Tullibardine	James Murray; 1690–1764; 2nd Duke of Atholl, 7th Baron Strange (4th creation)	George Murray; 1694–1760	John Murray; 1685–1752; 2nd Earl of Dunmore, Viscount of Fincastle, and Lord Murray of Blair, Moulin and Tillimet	William Murray; 1696–1756; 3rd Earl of Dunmore, Viscount of Fincastle, and Lord Murray of Blair, Moulin and Tillimet
Attainted and excluded from succession	Attainted and excluded from succession
Elizabeth Rawdon; 1731–1808; 16th Baroness Botreaux, 15th Baroness Hungerford, 13th Baroness de Moleyns, 13th Baroness Hastings	John Rawdon; 1720–1793; 1st Earl of Moira, 2nd Baron Rawdon, 4th Rawdon Baronet	Henrietta Ashburnham c. 1716–1732; 5th Baroness Strange (4th creation)	Charlotte Murray; 1731–1805; 8th Baroness Strange (4th creation)	John Murray; 1729–1774; 3rd Duke of Atholl	John Murray; 1730–1809; 4th Earl of Dunmore, Viscount of Fincastle, and Lord Murray of Blair, Moulin and Tillimet
Earl Strange and Baron Murray of Stanley, 1786	Baron Dunmore, 1831
Francis Rawdon-Hastings; 1754–1826; 1st Marquess of Hastings, 2nd Earl of Moira, 3rd Baron Rawdon, 5th Rawdon Baronet	Flora Mure-Campbell; 1780–1840; 6th Countess of Loudoun	John Murray; 1755–1830; 4th Duke of Atholl, 1st Earl Strange and Baron Murray of Stanley, 9th Baron Strange (4th creation)	George Murray; 1761–1803	George Murray; 1762–1836; 5th Earl of Dunmore, Viscount of Fincastle, and Lord Murray of Blair, Moulin and Tillimet, 1st Baron Dunmore	Alexander Murray; 1764–1842
Baron Glenlyon
George Augustus Francis Rawdon-Hastings; 1808–1844; 2nd Marquess of Hastings, Earl of Moira, Earl of Rawdon, and Baron Rawdon	Barbara Rawdon-Hastings; 1810–1858; 20th Baroness Grey de Ruthyn	Charlotte Murray; 1775–1832 m. Adam Drummond of Megginch	John Murray; 1778–1846; 5th Duke of Atholl, 2nd Earl Strange and Baron Murray of Stanley, 10th Baron Strange (4th creation)	James Murray; 1782–1837; 1st Baron Glenlyon	George Murray; 1784–1860
Edith Maud Rawdon-Hastings; 1833–1874; 10th Countess of Loudoun	John Drummond; 1803–1889	George Augustus Frederick John Murray; 1814–1864; 6th Duke of Atholl, 11th Baron Strange (4th creation), 3rd Baron Murray of Stanley, 2nd Baron Glenlyon	George Edward Murray; 1818–1854	Alexander Edward Murray; 1804–1845; 6th Earl of Dunmore, Viscount of Fincastle, and Lord Murray of Blair, Moulin and Tillimet, 2nd Baron Dunmore	Virginius Murray; 1817–1861
Paulyn Francis Cuthbert Rawdon-Hastings; 1856–1907	Malcolm Drummond; 1856–1924	John James Hugh Henry Stewart-Murray; 1840–1917; 7th Duke of Atholl, 12th Baron Strange (4th creation), 4th Baron Murray of Stanley, 3rd Baron Glenlyon	George Herbert Murray; 1849–1936	Douglas Stuart Murray; 1853–1920	Charles Adolphus Murray; 1841–1907; 7th Earl of Dunmore, Viscount of Fincastle, and Lord Murray of Blair, Moulin and Tillimet, 3rd Baron Dunmore	Reginald Murray; 1846–1925
Baron Stanley abeyance ended, 1921	Baron Strange of Knockyn abeyance ended, 1921
Edith Abney-Hastings; 1883–1960; 12th Countess of Loudoun, Baroness Botreaux, Baroness Hastings, Baroness Stanley	Elizabeth Philipps Abney-Hastings; 1884–1974; 22nd Baroness Hungerford, 20th Baroness de Moleyns, 14th Baroness Strange of Knockyn	John George Stewart-Murray; 1871–1942; 8th Duke of Atholl and Marquess of Tullibardine, 13th Baron Strange (4th creation), 5th Baron Murray of Stanley, 4th Baron Glenlyon	James Thomas Stewart-Murray; 1879–1957; 9th Duke of Atholl, 14th Baron Strange (4th creation), 6th Baron Murray of Stanley, 5th Baron Glenlyon	George Evelyn Pemberton Murray; 1880–1947	George Murray; 1884–1940	Alexander Edward Murray; 1871–1962; 8th Earl of Dunmore, Viscount of Fincastle, and Lord Murray of Blair, Moulin and Tillimet, 4th Baron Dunmore	Arthur Charles Murray; 1882–1964
Earldom of Strange and Baronies of Murray and Glenlyon extinct and Barony of Strange abeyant, 1957
Baron Strange (4th creation) abeyance terminated, 1965
Jestyn Reginald Austin Plantagenet Philipps; 1917–1991; 2nd Viscount St Davids, 23rd Baron Hungerford, 21st Baron de Moleyns, 15th Baron Strange of Knockyn	John Drummond; 1900–1982; 15th Baron Strange (4th creation)	George Anthony Murray; 1907–1945	Edward David Murray; 1908–1940 styled Viscount Fincastle	Reginald Arthur Murray; 1911–1981; 10th Earl of Dunmore, Viscount of Fincastle, and Lord Murray of Blair, Moulin and Tillimet	Kenneth Randolph Murray; 1913–1995; 11th Earl of Dunmore, Viscount of Fincastle, and Lord Murray of Blair, Moulin and Tillimet
Baron Strange (4th creation) abeyant, 1982–1986
Colwyn Iestyn John Philipps; 1939–2009; 3rd Viscount St Davids, 24th Baron Hungerford, 22nd Baron de Moleyns, 16th Baron Strange of Knockyn	Jean Cherry Drummond; 1928–2008; 16th Baroness Strange (4th creation)	George Iain Murray; 1931–1996; 10th Duke of Atholl	John Murray; 1929–2012; 11th Duke of Atholl	John Alexander Murray; 1939–1980; 9th Earl of Dunmore, Viscount of Fincastle, and Lord Murray of Blair, Moulin and Tillimet, 5th Baron Dunmore
Barony Dunmore extinct, 1980
Rhodri Colwyn Philipps b. 1966; 4th Viscount St Davids, 25th Baron Hungerford, 23rd Baron de Moleyns, 17th Baron Strange of Knockyn	Roland Augusto Jestyn Estanislao Philipps b. 1970	Adam Humphrey Drummond b. 1953; 17th Baron Strange (4th creation)	Bruce George Ronald Murray; 12th Duke of Atholl b. 1960	Malcolm Kenneth Murray b. 1946; 12th Earl of Dunmore, Viscount of Fincastle, and Lord Murray of Blair, Moulin and Tillimet	Geoffrey Charles Murray b. 1949
Heir presumptive to the Viscouncy St Davids, Barony Hungerford, Barony de Moleyns, and Barony of Strange of Knockyn	Heir presumptive to the Earldom of Dunmore
John Adam Humphrey Drummond b. 1992	Michael Bruce John Murray b. 1985 styled Marquess of Tullibardine	David Nicholas George Murray b. 1986
Heir apparent to the Barony of Strange (4th creation)	Heir apparent to the Dukedom of Atholl
