= William Stanley, 6th Earl of Derby =

English nobleman and politician

William Stanley KG
- Earl of Derby
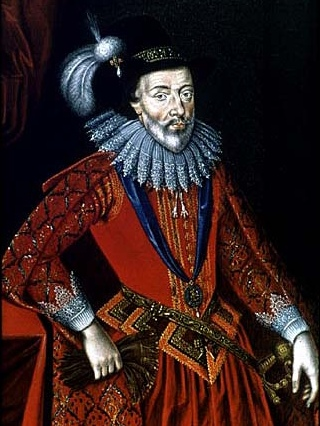
- William Stanley, the 6th Earl of Derby
- Known for: Travels, Shakespeare authorship candidate
- Born: 1561
- Died: 29 September 1642 (aged 80–81); Chester, Kingdom of England
- Locality: Lancashire, Cheshire
- Noble family: Stanley
- Spouse: Elizabeth de Vere (m. 1595; died 1627)
- Issue More...: James Stanley, 7th Earl of Derby; Robert Stanley; Anne Stanley, Countess of Ancram
- Father: Henry Stanley, 4th Earl of Derby
- Mother: Lady Margaret Clifford

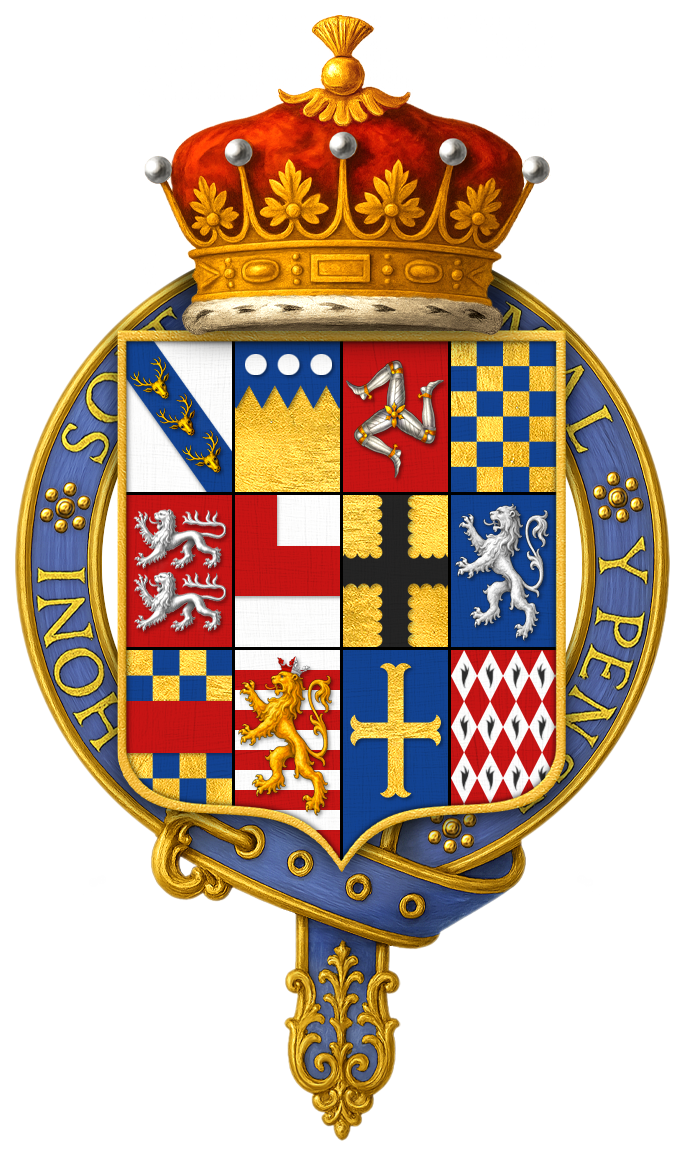
Quartered arms of Sir William Stanley, 6th Earl of Derby, KG

William Stanley, 6th Earl of Derby (1561 – 29 September 1642) was an English nobleman and politician. Stanley inherited a prominent social position that was both dangerous and unstable, as his mother was heir to Queen Elizabeth I under the Third Succession Act, a position inherited in 1596 by his deceased brother's oldest daughter, Anne, two years after William had inherited the Earldom from his brother. After a period of European travel in his youth, a long legal battle eventually consolidated his social position. Nevertheless, he was careful to remain circumspect in national politics, devoting himself to administration and cultural projects, including playwriting.

His own literary works are lost or unidentified, but in the 1890s he was put forward as one of the contenders to be the true author of the works of William Shakespeare, according to some proponents of the Shakespeare authorship question.

== Early life ==
William Stanley was a younger son of Henry Stanley, 4th Earl of Derby, by his marriage to Lady Margaret Clifford. His maternal grandparents were Henry Clifford, 2nd Earl of Cumberland, and Lady Eleanor Brandon. Eleanor was the third child of Charles Brandon, 1st Duke of Suffolk, and of Mary Tudor. Mary was the fifth child of Henry VII of England and Elizabeth of York. His mother was the heiress presumptive of Queen Elizabeth from 1578 until her own death in 1596. After this, Anne Stanley, the daughter of his older brother Ferdinando, became the heir to the throne.

== Travels ==
Stanley was educated at St John's College, Oxford. In 1582 he travelled to the continent to study in university towns in France and may also have attended Henry of Navarre's academy at Nérac. In 1585 he returned home but was once more sent to Paris as part of an embassy to Henry III of France. He then remained on the continent for a further three years of personal travels before returning home once more. He may have been accompanied on his travels by the young John Donne.

During his travels, William Stanley is said to have led an adventurous existence, being involved in duels and love affairs and travelling in disguise as a friar while in Italy. He is supposed to have also visited Egypt, where he fought and killed a tiger, then going on to Anatolia, where it is claimed he narrowly escaped being executed for insulting the prophet Mohammed; he was supposedly released because a Muslim noblewoman wanted to marry him. According to the story, he turned her down, travelling on to Moscow and then to Greenland, from where he returned to Europe in a whaling ship.

These colourful adventures are traceable to a popular ballad entitled Sir William Stanley's Garland, which exaggerates his three years away from England to "twenty-one years travels through most parts of the world". This was recorded in 1800 and its contents published in 1801. There is no extant documentary evidence for these supposed adventures, but the stories were regularly repeated in 19th-century biographies of the sixth Earl.

== Inheritance dispute ==
Hypothetical succession in the female line from Henry VII,
through his daughter Mary and her second marriage

Henry VII
Henry VIII	Mary
Edward VI	Mary I	Elizabeth I
Henry	Frances	Eleanor
Jane	Katherine	Mary	Margaret
Edward	Thomas	Ferdinando
Anne	Frances
George	John

After the death of his father in 1593, William as the second son was bequeathed a number of Manors and Lordships including Bicester, Oxfordshire; Holborn, Middlesex; Burton in Lonsdale, Yorkshire and West Lidford in Somerset, his elder brother Ferdinando Stanley, 5th Earl of Derby, inherited the Earldom and its estates, but he died a few months later in April 1594, leaving three daughters but no sons. Ferdinando's daughters claimed their father's estates, while William inherited the titles of Earl of Derby and Baron Strange. A further complexity was that Ferdinando's eldest daughter Anne Stanley, Countess of Castlehaven, became officially the heir presumptive to Elizabeth's throne in 1596 on the death of her grandmother. A complex legal dispute followed, which dragged on for many years. This led to a judgement that the Isle of Man, a possession of the 5th Earl, was forfeit to the Queen. However, the Queen ceded her right to it in recognition of the Stanley family's services. Stanley was granted Lathom and Knowsley, with other lands and estates in Lancashire, Cumberland, Yorkshire, Cheshire, Wales, and elsewhere, while Ferdinando's daughters received estates linked to baronies and the Isle of Man, but they sold it to their uncle, the 6th Earl, and his title to it was later confirmed by James I. While retaining the title of Lord of Mann, Derby passed the administration of the Isle of Man to his niece, Anne Stanley. In 1612 he transferred the title to his wife, Elizabeth. Derby's assumption of the barony of Strange was not contested in his lifetime, but after his death, it was determined to have been incorrect, and a new creation of the barony was given to his son.

== Career ==
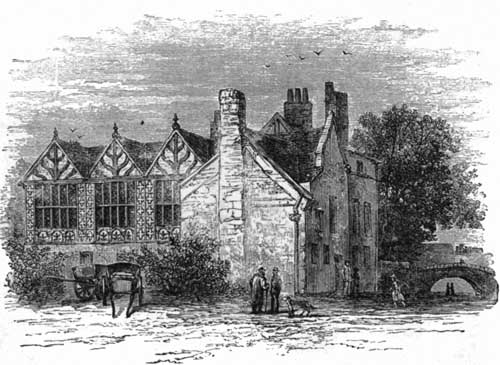
Stanley House, Watergate, Chester, the Earl's retirement home

The Stanley family, as the lawful heirs to the throne of England through Henry VIII's sister Mary Tudor, were suspected of Roman Catholic sympathies.

There were many rumours surrounding the untimely death of Ferdinando Derby, who had been approached to lead an attempt to overthrow Queen Elizabeth, but had remained loyal to her. Due to the sudden and violent nature of his final illness, poisoning was widely suspected. Possibly because of the potential for military rebellion in alliance with Irish Roman Catholics, the 6th Earl was expressly forbidden by the Queen to take part in the Earl of Essex's campaign in Ireland.

He, therefore, limited his involvement with national politics, devoting himself primarily to the management of his estates and his dominant position in local administration in Lancashire and Cheshire. In 1603 he became a member of the Privy Council of England.

Queen Elizabeth granted Derby the Order of the Garter in 1601, while James VI and I appointed him Lord Chamberlain of Chester. A few years after the death of his wife, when Derby was "old and infirm, and desirous of withdrawing himself from the hurry and fatigue of life" he assigned his estates to his son James, retaining an annuity of £1,000. He bought a house by the River Dee just outside Chester, where he lived in retirement until his death on 29 September 1642.

== Shakespearean authorship question ==
Derby is one of several individuals who have been claimed by proponents of the Shakespearean authorship question to be the true author of William Shakespeare's works. Derby's candidacy was first proposed in 1891 by the archivist James H. Greenstreet, who identified a pair of letters by the Jesuit spy George Fenner dating from 1599 in which he reported that Derby was unlikely to advance the Catholic cause, as he was "busy penning plays for the common players."

Greenstreet argued that the comic scenes in Love's Labour's Lost were influenced by a pageant of the Nine Worthies only ever performed in Derby's home town of Chester. Greenstreet attempted to develop his ideas in a second paper, but died suddenly in 1892, leaving his arguments incomplete. The theory was revived in The Silent Shakespeare (1915) by the American writer Robert Frazer, who concluded that "William Stanley was William Shakespeare".

The idea was then taken up in France and was first advocated in scholarly detail when the Rabelais expert Abel Lefranc published his book, Sous le masque de William Shakespeare: William Stanley, VIe comte de Derby (1918). Several other authors later supported Derby's candidacy, sometimes as part of a group of writers.

While accepting Shakespeare's own authorship of the canon, Leo Daugherty, who wrote an account of Derby's life for the Oxford Dictionary of National Biography, has argued in a recent book that Stanley is the Fair Youth of Shakespeare's sonnets and that Richard Barnfield is the "Rival Poet". Stanley was Barnfield's patron and the subject of his homoerotic sonnet cycle The Affectionate Shepherd, which implied a romantic relationship between the pair.

== Family ==
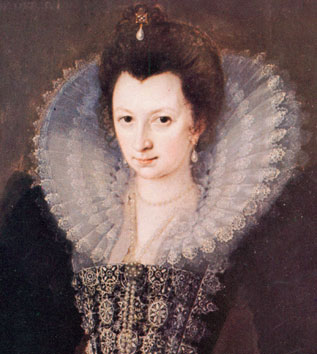
Derby's wife Elizabeth

On 26 January 1595, he married Elizabeth de Vere, daughter of Edward de Vere, 17th Earl of Oxford, and Anne Cecil. Elizabeth's maternal grandparents were William Cecil, 1st Baron Burghley, and his second wife Mildred Cooke. Mildred was the eldest daughter of Anthony Cooke and his wife Anne Fitzwilliam. It has been suggested that the occasion of their wedding was the inspiration for William Shakespeare's A Midsummer Night's Dream, and that the play was first performed at the couple's wedding festivities. In the early years the relationship was stormy, including claims that Elizabeth had had affairs with Robert Devereux, 2nd Earl of Essex, and Walter Raleigh. The relationship settled down as Derby's financial and social position stabilised. The couple had five children:

- James Stanley, 7th Earl of Derby (31 January 1607 – 15 October 1651).
- Robert Stanley (d. 1632).
- Anne Stanley, Countess of Ancram (d. 1657). Married first Sir Henry Portman and secondly Robert Carr, 1st Earl of Ancram.
- Elizabeth Stanley. Died young.
- Elizabeth Stanley. Named after deceased older sister. Died young.

Political offices
Vacant Title last held by The 4th Earl of Derby	Lord Lieutenant of Cheshire and Lancashire; 1607–1642 with Lord Strange (1626–1642)	English Interregnum
Vacant Title last held by The 4th Earl of Derby	Vice-Admiral of Cheshire and Lancashire; 1607–1638	Succeeded by Lord Strange
Peerage of England
Preceded by Ferdinando Stanley	Earl of Derby; 1594–1642	Succeeded by James Stanley
Head of State of the Isle of Man
Preceded by Robert Cecil	Lord of Mann; 1609–1612	Succeeded by Elizabeth de Vere, Countess of Derby
