= Ferdinando Stanley, 5th Earl of Derby =

English nobleman and politician

The Right Honourable The Earl of Derby
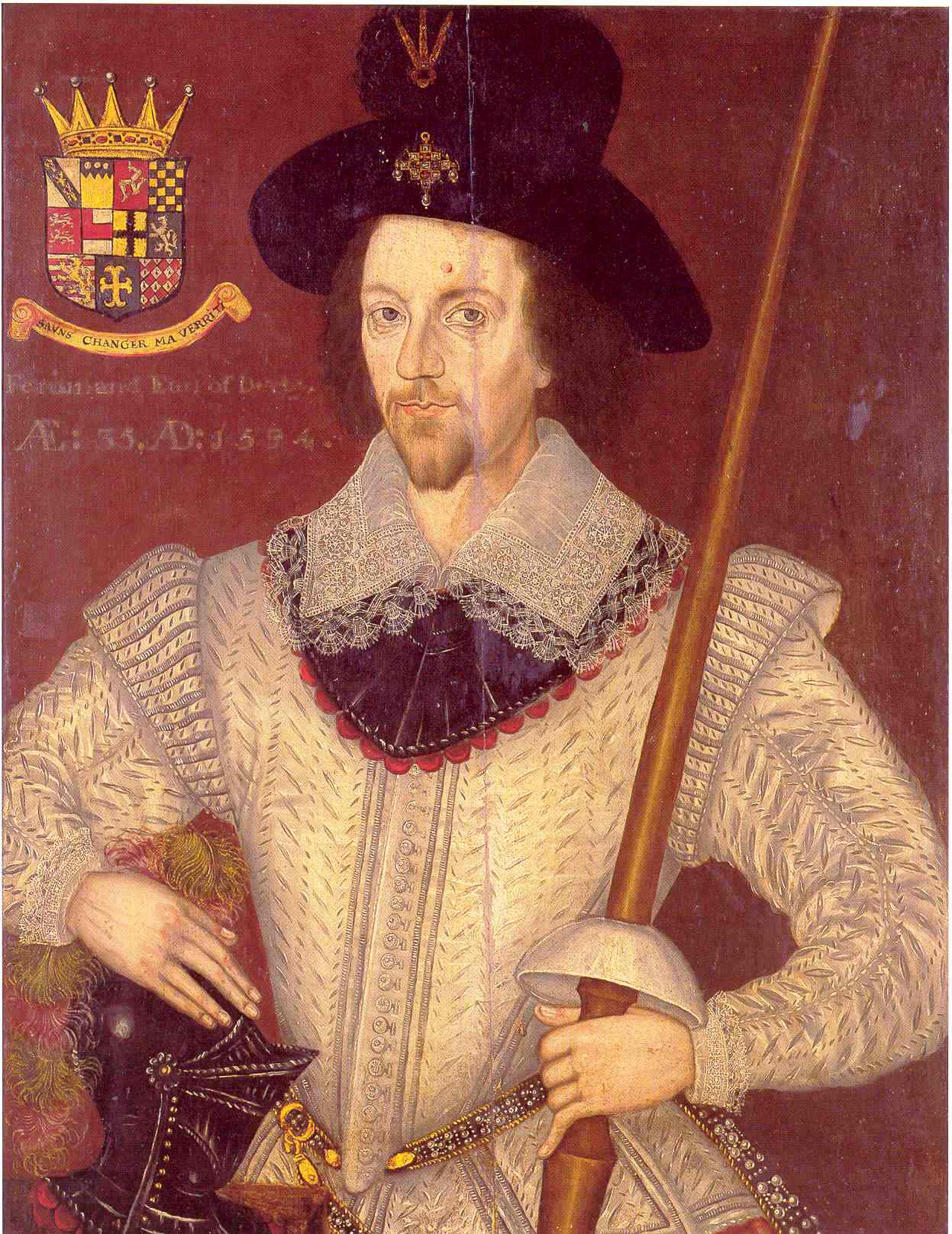
- Ferdinando Stanley, the 5th Earl of Derby
- Tenure: 1593–1594
- Born: 1559
- Died: 16 April 1594 (aged 34–35)
- Locality: Lancashire, Cheshire
- Spouse: Alice Spencer
- Issue: Anne Stanley, Countess of Castlehaven; Frances Egerton, Countess of Bridgewater; Elizabeth Stanley, Countess of Huntingdon
- Father: Henry Stanley, 4th Earl of Derby
- Mother: Lady Margaret Clifford

Ferdinando Stanley, 5th Earl of Derby (1559 – 16 April 1594), was an English nobleman and politician. He was the son of Henry Stanley, 4th Earl of Derby, and Lady Margaret Clifford. Ferdinando had a place in the line of succession to Elizabeth I according to the will of Henry VIII, after his mother, whom he predeceased. His sudden death led to suspicions of poisoning amid fears of Catholic plots to overthrow Elizabeth.

== Baron Strange ==
In about 1572, when he was thirteen, Stanley matriculated as a member of the University of Oxford. A year later he was called to her Court by Queen Elizabeth, "to be shaped in good manners". He was subsequently summoned to Parliament in his father's Barony of Strange (of Knokyn) and became known as "Ferdinando, Lord Straunge". In 1579 he married Alice Spencer, the youngest daughter of Sir John Spencer of Althorp by his marriage to Catherine Kytson.

Ferdinando was a supporter of the arts, enjoying music, dance, poetry, and singing, but above all, he loved the theatre. He was the patron of many writers, including Robert Greene, Christopher Marlowe, Edmund Spenser, and William Shakespeare. Shakespeare may have been employed by Strange in his early years as one of Lord Strange's Men, when this troupe of acrobats and tumblers was reorganised, emphasising the performing of plays. By 1590, Strange was allied with the Admiral's Men, performing at The Theatre (owned by James Burbage, father of Richard Burbage).

During this period, Ferdinando remained circumspect about his true opinions on religion and other matters. The Jesuit writer Robert Parsons expressed frustration, stating that "diverse men" were not satisfied "with the course of this lord hitherto". Parsons hoped that the accession of the Stanleys to the English throne might aid the Roman Catholic cause, but that "the Earl of Derby's religion is held to be doubtful, as some do think him to be of all three religions [Roman Catholic; Church of England; Puritan] and others of none." Parsons added that "no side will esteem or trust him" because of this. Nevertheless, Elizabeth's chief minister Lord Burghley received several reports that "Papists" were attempting to build support for Ferdinando, whom they might agree unanimously to make king, as one of his informants stated.

== Earl of Derby ==
=== Cultural patronage ===
Ferdinando's father died on 25 September 1593, and he succeeded him as Earl of Derby. Lord Strange's Men were accordingly renamed to "Derby's Men". Scholars believe that Shakespeare was involved with this company of players both as an actor and playwright. The troupe produced Titus Andronicus and the trilogy of Henry VI, Part 1, Henry VI, Part 2, and Henry VI, Part 3. Some of these plays may contain oblique references to the Stanley family's political position at the time.

Ferdinando was considered "of an exalted genius as well as birth", and during the absence of his father on State business he ably discharged the duties of the Lieutenancies of Lancashire and Cheshire. He was both a poet and author, enjoying the society of eminent Elizabethan men of letters. Edmund Spenser, the poet, personified Ferdinando as "Amyntas", and his Countess as "Amaryllis". In 1610, a collection of English poems entitled Belvedere; or the Garden of the Muses was published which included work which may be by Ferdinando, but without his name being attached to it, and the identification remains to a large extent a matter of conjecture.

=== Hesketh plot ===
After his succession to his father's titles and estates, more reports of Roman Catholic plots on Ferdinando's behalf reached Burghley, particularly of a priest in Rome who had said of the new Earl of Derby that "though he were of no religion, should find friends to decide a nearer estate [to the throne]". English rebels who had fled overseas sent a man named Richard Hesketh to urge Ferdinando that he had a claim to the crown of England by right of his descent from Mary, Queen Dowager of France, the second surviving daughter of Henry VII and a younger sister of Henry VIII. The Heskeths had once been retainers of the Stanley family and were also family friends. This is why Richard Hesketh was chosen to approach Derby about the matter that has come to be known as "the Hesketh Plot". Ferdinando held two private meetings with Hesketh and then took him to London for further discussions with his mother, who had earlier been excluded from the Queen's court for allegedly plotting against Elizabeth. However, he finally dramatically rejected Hesketh's proposition with displays of scorn and indignation, even turning him over to Burghley.

Hesketh was interrogated and later executed. However, Stanley, who had hoped that his display of loyalty to Elizabeth would be rewarded, was shut out of the case and was marginalised. He was dismayed when the position of Lord Chamberlain of Chester was given to Thomas Egerton rather than himself, complaining that he was "crossed in court and crossed in his country".

== Death ==
His death was mysterious. A few months after the Hesketh affair, he was suddenly taken ill with a severe and violent sickness. Poisoning was suspected. It was claimed that Hesketh had threatened him that he would soon die if he did not accept his plans. He was said to have been poisoned by the Jesuits, his gentleman of horse being suspected of administering the poison. The historian John Stow recorded his illness in great detail. It has been suggested that poisonous mushrooms were used, others alleged arsenic.

A contemporary note of the Earl's symptoms, the remedies he took, and the grounds for suspicion of witchcraft survive. He fell sick at Knowsley Hall but travelled to Lathom House where he took bezoar stone and, allegedly, powdered unicorn's horn as medicine. He died on 16 April 1594.

== Succession ==
From his marriage to Alice Spencer, was born his eldest daughter, Anne Stanley, Countess of Castlehaven, in 1580. Henry VIII's will would have made her queen in 1603 as heiress of Henry's younger sister Mary Tudor; Elizabeth was actually succeeded by James VI of Scotland, the heir of Henry's older sister, Margaret Tudor.

Bernard Burke also mentioned two younger daughters of the Earl and Alice Spencer. Lady Frances Stanley (1583–1636) became the wife of John Egerton, 1st Earl of Bridgewater and mother of John Egerton, 2nd Earl of Bridgewater. Lady Elizabeth Stanley (1588–1633) was married to Henry Hastings, 5th Earl of Huntingdon. Their son Ferdinando Hastings, 6th Earl of Huntingdon was named after his maternal grandfather.

Ferdinando was succeeded as Earl of Derby by his younger brother, William. But the Baronies of Strange (of Knokyn) [1299], Mohun (of Dunster) [1299], and Stanley [1456], fell into abeyance between his daughters and coheirs. The Barony of Strange (of Knokyn) was, however, improperly assumed by the succeeding Earls of Derby, and being, erroneously, supposed, in 1628, to belong to them, gave occasion to a writ of that date whereby a new Barony of the name of "Strange" was created.

== Ancestry ==
Ancestors of Ferdinando Stanley, 5th Earl of Derby

8. Thomas Stanley, 2nd Earl of Derby
4. Edward Stanley, 3rd Earl of Derby
9. Anne Hastings
2. Henry Stanley, 4th Earl of Derby
10. Thomas Howard, 2nd Duke of Norfolk
5. Lady Dorothy Howard
11. Agnes Tilney
1. Ferdinando Stanley, 5th Earl of Derby
12. Henry Clifford, 1st Earl of Cumberland
6. Henry Clifford, 2nd Earl of Cumberland
13. Margaret Percy
3. Lady Margaret Clifford
14. Charles Brandon, 1st Duke of Suffolk
7. Lady Eleanor Brandon
15. Mary Tudor

Political offices
Preceded by The 4th Earl of Derby	Vice-Admiral of Cheshire and Lancashire; 1593–1594	Vacant Title next held by The 6th Earl of Derby
Peerage of England
Preceded by Henry Stanley	Earl of Derby; 1593–1594	Succeeded by William Stanley
Preceded by Henry Stanley	Baron Stanley; 1593–1594	Vacant Abeyant until 1921 Title next held by Edith Abney-Hastings
Preceded by Henry Stanley	Baron Mohun; 1593–1594	Vacant Abeyant
Preceded by Henry Stanley	Baron Strange (writ in acceleration); 1589–1594	Vacant Abeyant until 1921 Title next held by Elizabeth Philipps
Regnal titles
Preceded by Henry Stanley	Lord of Mann; 1593–1594	Vacant Succession dispute until 1607 Title next held by Henry Howard
