= John Mohun =

John Mohun may refer to

- John Mohun, 1st Baron Mohun of Okehampton (1595–1641), English MP for Grampound
- John Mohun, 2nd Baron Mohun (1320–1376), original Knight of the Garter
- John de Mohun, 1st Baron Mohun (d. 1330), Baron Mohun
