= Westhorpe =

Westhorpe may refer to the following places in England:

- Westhorpe, Lincolnshire
- Westhorpe, Nottinghamshire
- Westhorpe, Suffolk
  - site of Westhorpe Hall
- Westhorpe House, Buckinghamshire

== See also ==
- Westhorp
- Westthorpe
