= John Mohun, 1st Baron Mohun =

There are 2 people with the name and title John Mohun, 1st Barons Mohun:

- John de Mohun, 1st Baron Mohun, Lord of Dunster d. 1330
- John Mohun, 1st Baron Mohun of Okehampton (1595–1641)
