= Anne Grey (disambiguation) =

Anne Grey (1907–1987) was a British actress.

Anne Grey may also refer to:

- Anne Brandon, Baroness Grey of Powys (c.1507–1558), married name Anne Grey
- Anne de Grey (died 1733), wife of Lord Charles Cavendish
- Lady Anne Grey (1490–1545), a daughter of George Grey, 2nd Earl of Kent

== See also ==
- Anne Gray McCready
