= Richard Hesketh (exile) =

English Roman Catholic exile

- Born: 1562
- Died: 29 November 1593 (aged 30–31)
- Occupation: Roman Catholic exile

Richard Hesketh (1562 – 29 November 1593) was an English Roman Catholic exile.

== Biography ==
Hesketh was the third son of Sir Thomas Hesketh of Rufford and Martholme, by Alice, daughter of Sir John Holcroft of Holcroft. Hesketh was baptised at Great Harwood, near Blackburn, Lancashire, on 28 July 1562, and brought up in the catholic religion. He joined the English refugees on the continent, and probably served in Sir William Stanley's regiment in Flanders. On the death of Henry Stanley, fourth earl of Derby, in September 1592, Hesketh was commissioned by Sir William Stanley and the jesuit Father Holt to encourage the earl's son and successor, Ferdinando, lord Strange, to lay claim to the succession to the crown after the death of Elizabeth, on the ground that the Stanleys "were next in propinquity of blood" to the queen. Hesketh was directed to promise Spanish aid. The new Earl of Derby refused to entertain Hesketh's proposals, and delivered him to justice. He was executed at St. Albans on 29 November 1593, and when on the scaffold, "naming Sir William Stanley and others, cursed the time he had ever known anie of them" (Sadler, State Papers, iii. 20, Appendix). Dodd denounces as a calumny Hesketh's assertion that the catholic exiles had set him upon the project (Church Hist. ii. 160).

His brother, Thomas Hesketh, was a lawyer and politician.
