= Thomas Hesketh =

English politician

Sir Thomas Hesketh
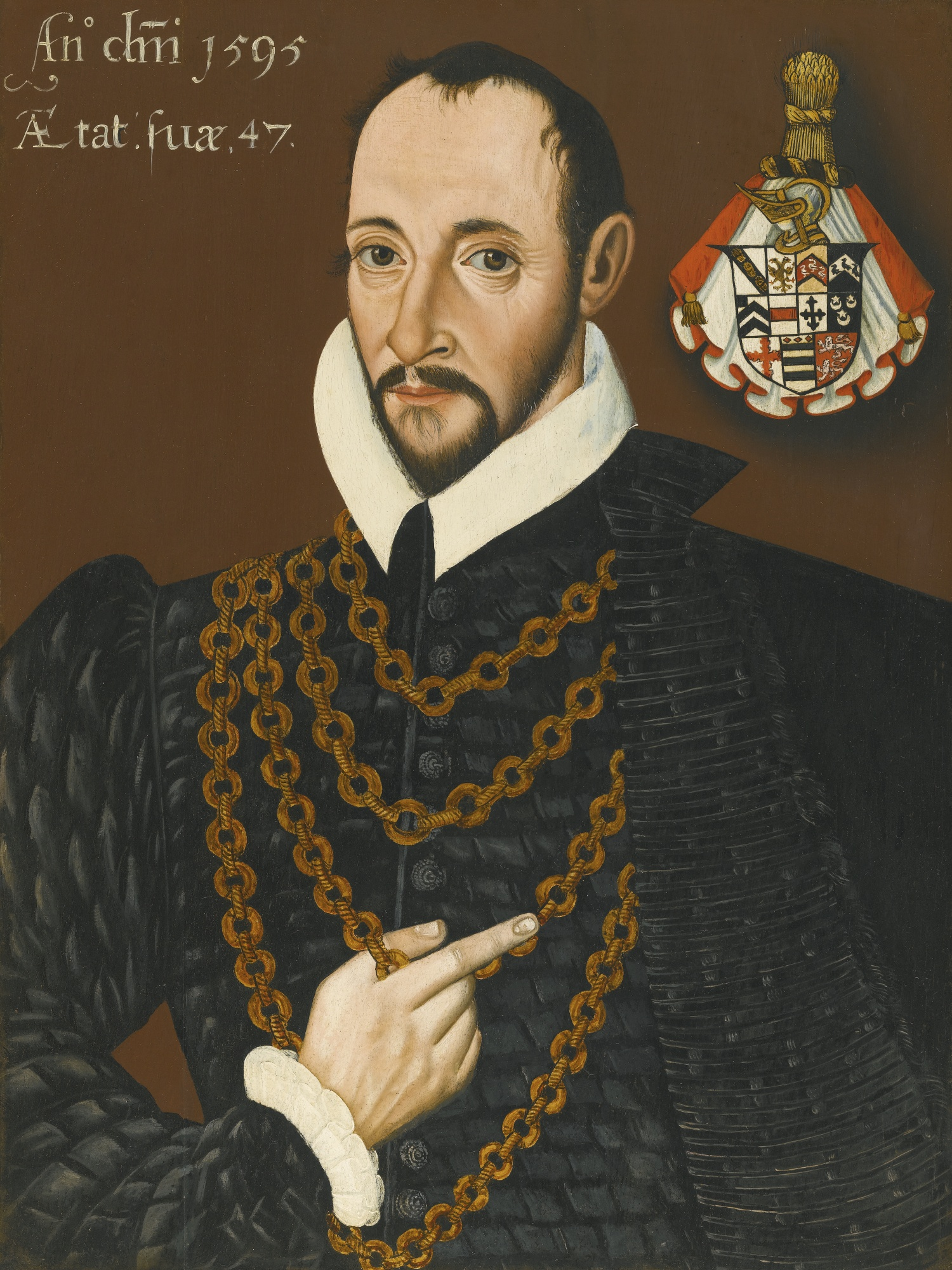
- Hesketh in 1595

MP
- Constituency: Preston (1586-1593), Lancaster (1597-1601), Lancashire (1601-1504), Lancaster (1604-1605)

Personal details
- Born: 1548
- Died: October 15, 1605

Sir Thomas Hesketh of Whitehill (1548–15 October 1605) was an English lawyer and politician. (Note: White Hill Farm, Goosnargh.)

Born the second son of Gabriel Hesketh of Aughton and Jane Halsall, Hesketh was educated at Hart Hall, Oxford, and the University of Cambridge, before entering Grays Inn in 1572. As most of his official appointments appear to have been in Lancashire, it is assumed that he practiced law in the courts of the duchy of Lancaster.

He was a Member (MP) of the Parliament of England for Preston in 1586 and 1589, Lancaster in 1597 and 1604, and Lancashire in 1601. Hesketh was knighted in 1603. A landowner in both Essex and Yorkshire, Hesketh purchased Heslington Hall in Yorkshire around the time he was knighted.

A number of Shakespearean scholars, including E.K. Chambers and E. A. J. Honigmann, have suggested that the playwright was well acquainted with Hesketh, during time spent in Lancashire under the alias William Shakeshafte, with Chambers even suggesting that Shakespeare was employed by Hesketh for a time. However, this theory has been disputed by others who argue that Shakeshafte an unrelated writer with a coincidental name.

Hesketh's older brother Bartholomew was a noted recusant, who was questioned by the privy council in 1581 for sheltering the Jesuit Edmund Campion. A younger brother Richard was a cloth merchant with connections to John Dee, Edward Kelly, and William Stanley, who was executed in 1593 for treason, after attempting to incite Ferdinando Stanley to rebel against Elizabeth I. Stanley would later claim that the Richard's actions were part of a conspiracy by the family against his rule as Earl of Derby, including that Thomas Hesketh had used his official powers to oppose him. Although Thomas Heneage recommended Hesketh's character to William Cecil in response to Stanley's attack, Hesketh was later described as 'very partial' in his judiciary.

Hesketh died in 1605, and was interred in Westminster Abbey, where a memorial in the north choir aisle bears his image. His widow, Juliana would later remarry the judge Ranulph Crewe.
