= Mary Brandon, Baroness Monteagle =

English noblewoman

Mary Brandon
- Baroness Monteagle
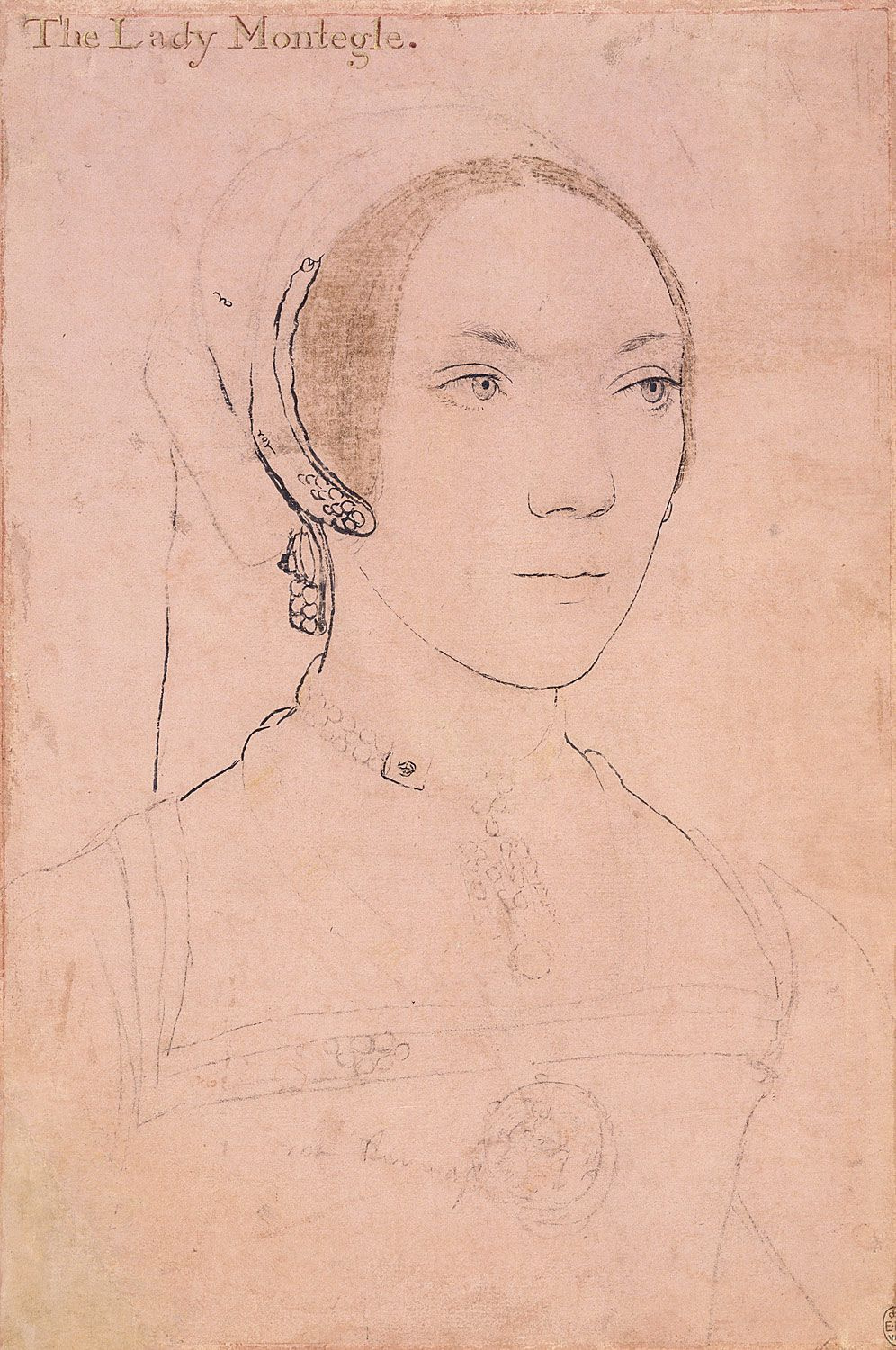
- Portrait of Mary Brandon, Baroness Monteagle, drawn by Hans Holbein the Younger
- Born: 2 June 1510; England
- Died: 1540/1544 (aged around 30-34); England
- Noble family: Brandon
- Spouses: Thomas Stanley, 2nd Baron Monteagle
- Issue: William Stanley, 3rd Baron Monteagle; Francis Stanley; Charles Stanley; Elizabeth Stanley; Anne Stanley; Margaret Stanley
- Father: Charles Brandon, 1st Duke of Suffolk
- Mother: Anne Browne
- Occupation: Lady-in-waiting

Lady Mary Brandon (2 June 1510 – between 1540/1544) was an English noblewoman, and the daughter of Charles Brandon, 1st Duke of Suffolk, by his second wife, Anne Browne. Mary was the wife of Thomas Stanley, 2nd Baron Monteagle, by whom she had six children.

Mary Brandon was a lady-in-waiting to Queen consort Jane Seymour, third wife of King Henry VIII, who held her in high favour. She was the subject of a portrait by Hans Holbein the Younger.

== Life ==
Lady Mary Brandon was born on 2 June 1510, the second eldest daughter of Charles Brandon by his second wife, Anne Browne, only child of Sir Anthony Browne, Standard-Bearer of England by his first wife Eleanor Ughtred, daughter of Sir Robert Ughtred (c.1428-c.1487). Mary had an elder sister, Lady Anne Brandon. Prior to his marriage to Anne Browne, Charles Brandon had married her step-aunt, the wealthy widow, Margaret Neville; however, he had been previously bethrothed to Anne, and deserted her while she was pregnant with Mary's sister, Anne. After his marriage to Margaret was declared null and void due to his pre-contract with Anne Browne, he married the latter. Years later in 1528, Pope Clement VII issued a Papal Bull, which confirmed that Charles Brandon's divorce from Margaret Neville was valid, thus establishing the legitimacy of Mary and Anne.

In 1511, Anne Browne died, and four years later, Charles Brandon, recently created Duke of Suffolk, married his third wife, Mary Tudor, the widowed Queen of France. Mary and Anne would be brought up with their father, stepmother and three half-siblings, Henry Brandon, 1st Earl of Lincoln, Lady Frances Brandon, and Lady Eleanor Brandon at Westhorpe Hall.

In 1533, following the death of Mary Tudor on 25 June, Mary and her sister Anne, by then Baroness Grey of Powys, pushed themselves to the front of the funeral cortege at the Abbey of St. Edmundsbury, just as the coffin was being lowered into the crypt, much to the consternation of their half-siblings. On 7 September 1533, Charles Brandon married his 14-year-old ward, Katherine Willoughby.

== Marriage and issue ==
Sometime before 1527, Mary married Thomas Stanley, 2nd Baron Monteagle, son of Edward Stanley, 1st Baron Monteagle and Elizabeth Vaughan. Thomas Stanley was made a Knight of the Bath at the coronation of King Henry VIII's second wife, Anne Boleyn, on 1 June 1533.

Together, Mary and Thomas had six children:

- William Stanley, 3rd Baron Monteagle (1528 – 10 November 1581), married firstly, Anne Leyburne, by whom he had one daughter, Elizabeth; and secondly, Anne Spencer.
- Francis Stanley, died childless.
- Charles Stanley, died childless.
- Elizabeth Stanley, married Richard Zouche, died childless.
- Anne Stanley, married Sir John Clifton and had issue.
- Margaret Stanley, married firstly, William Sutton, and secondly John Taylard.

== Lady-in-waiting ==
She spent most of her time at the royal court where she served as a favoured lady-in-waiting to Queen Jane Seymour, who made her a present of some jewellery. Her portrait was drawn by German painter, Hans Holbein the Younger.

In 1538, her husband complained to Thomas Cromwell about misbehaviour on her part, but nothing ever came of the allegations.

Mary Brandon died sometime between 1540 and 1544. Her husband died on 18 August 1560.
