= Westhorpe Hall =

Building in Westhorpe, Suffolk, England

Coordinates: 52°16′57″N 01°00′15″E

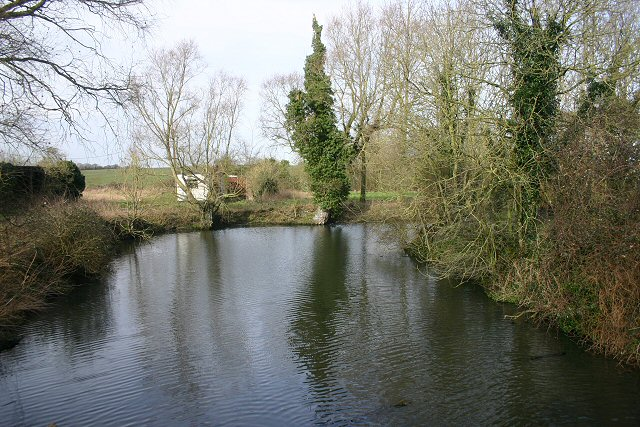
Moat of Westhorpe Hall in 1991

Westhorpe Hall was a manor house in Westhorpe, Suffolk, England.

Westhorpe Hall was the residence of Charles Brandon, 1st Duke of Suffolk and of Princess Mary (daughter of King Henry VII and sister of King Henry VIII), a love match and second marriage for Mary (she was briefly Queen consort of France as wife of Louis XII) and third marriage for Charles. He was previously married to the wealthy widow Margaret Neville, and then Anne Browne, mother to Charles's two eldest daughters, Anne Brandon and Mary Brandon. There, they raised their children, Frances (mother of Lady Jane Grey), Eleanor, and Henry Brandon, 1st Earl of Lincoln. Princess Mary Tudor died at Westhorpe Hall where her body was embalmed and held in state for three weeks.

When the house was being demolished in the late 1760s, the site was visited by the antiquarian Thomas Martin of Palgrave:

"I went to see the dismal ruins of Westhorpe Hall, formerly the seat of Charles Brandon, Duke of Suffolk. The workmen are now pulling it down as fast as may be, in a very careless and injudicious manner. The coping bricks, battlements and many other ornamental pieces, are made of earth, and burnt hard, as fresh as when first built. They might, with care, have been taken down whole, but all the fine chimnies, and ornaments were pulled down with ropes, and crushed to pieces in a most shameful manner. There was a monstrous figure of Hercules sitting cross legged with his club, and a lion beside him, but all shattered in pieces. The painted glass is likely to share the same fate. The timber is fresh and sound, and the building, which was very lofty, stood as when it was first built. It is a pity that care is not taken to preserve some few of our ancient fabrics."

Part of the household office stands, now a retirement home facing the village green. It has late 16th- and early 17th-century timber-framed and plastered range; a red brick main block is early 18th century, remodelled in the late 18th century, following the demolition of the manor house. All surviving structures have been altered in the 20th century.
