= Anne Brandon, Baroness Grey of Powys =

English noble (1507–1558)

Anne Brandon
- Baroness Grey of Powys
- Born: c. 1507; England
- Died: January 1558
- Buried: London (either Westminster Abbey or St. Margaret's Church)
- Noble family: Brandon
- Spouses: Edward Grey, 3rd Baron Grey of Powys; Randal Haworth
- Father: Charles Brandon, 1st Duke of Suffolk
- Mother: Anne Browne

Lady Anne Brandon, Baroness Grey of Powys (c. 1507 – January 1558) was an English noblewoman, and the eldest daughter of Charles Brandon, 1st Duke of Suffolk by his second wife, Anne Browne. Anne's mother had died in 1511. In 1514, Anne's father secured a place for her at the court of Archduchess Margaret of Savoy. While Anne was abroad, her father married Mary Tudor, the widowed Queen consort of Louis XII of France and the youngest sister of Henry VIII.

Anne married firstly Edward Grey, 3rd Baron Grey of Powys in 1525. Following the dissolution of the marriage, she created a scandal by living openly with her lover Randal Haworth, whom she later married. In 1540, her husband petitioned King Henry VIII's Privy Council, to punish Anne for adultery, accusing her and Haworth of having conspired to murder him. Nothing came of the allegations.

== Family and early years ==
Lady Anne was born in about 1507, the eldest daughter of Charles Brandon, who would later, in 1514, be created Duke of Suffolk. Her mother was Anne Browne, her father's second wife. Before 1507, her father deserted Anne Browne, to whom he was betrothed and who was pregnant with Anne, in order to marry her maternal aunt Margaret Neville, a wealthy widow. When that marriage was declared null and void, he returned to Anne and married her as his second wife. The marriage also produced a younger daughter, Lady Mary Brandon. Years later, in 1528, Pope Clement VII issued a Papal Bull which confirmed that Brandon's divorce from Margaret Neville, who was still alive, was valid, thus establishing the legitimacy of Anne and her sister Mary.

In 1514, Brandon arranged for Anne to be sent to the court of Archduchess Margaret of Savoy, Governor of the Netherlands. She was aged about seven years. While Anne was in the Netherlands, in 1515 her father married his third wife, Mary Tudor, the widowed Queen consort of King Louis XII of France, who was Henry VIII's youngest sister.

Anne returned to England at her stepmother's insistence, although her father had intended her to stay at the court of Archduchess Margaret, saying to the latter "the Queen [Mary Tudor] has so urged and prayed me to have her that I cannot contradict her." Two gentlemen escorted Anne from the Netherlands to Westhorpe Hall, where she and her younger sister, Mary, made their home with their father, stepmother and three remaining half-siblings: Henry Brandon, 1st Earl of Lincoln, Lady Frances Brandon, and Lady Eleanor Brandon. Their other half-sibling, also named Henry (b. 11 March 1516) had died in 1522.

In June 1533, after the death of Mary Tudor, Anne and her sister Mary pushed themselves to the head of the funeral cortege just before the coffin was lowered into the crypt of the Abbey of St Edmundsbury, much to the consternation of their half-siblings. Anne's father married his young ward Katherine Willoughby later that year.

== Marriages ==
In 1525, Anne married her first husband, Edward Grey, 3rd Baron Grey of Powys (1503–1551). The marriage was not successful, and Anne was unhappy. In 1537, she left him for a lover, Randal Haworth, after Grey had already taken a mistress, Jane Orrell, by whom he had a total of six illegitimate children (Edward, Jane, Anne Cecily, Walter, Andrew and Thomas), and upon whom he would later entail the greater part of his estates comprising the barony of Powys. Her father, with the assistance of Thomas Cromwell, forced Grey to support her, and succeeded in obtaining for her an annuity of £100 . He also asked Cromwell to help discipline Anne so that she would "live after such an honest sort as shall be to her honor and mine". In 1540, Grey petitioned the Privy Council to punish Anne for adultery, and also accused Anne and Haworth of conspiring to murder him. No action was taken against Anne, and she remained with her lover; however, this scandalous arrangement caused her to be excluded from Charles Brandon's will, which contained generous bequests to her two half-sisters, Frances and Eleanor.

Sometime between 1545 and 1551, Anne conspired with a corrupt judge in the Court of Chancery to obtain lands with forged documents, which defrauded Henry Grey, Marquess of Dorset, the husband of her half-sister, Frances, who quickly succeeded the Brandons' father as Duke of Suffolk of a new creation. When the affair came to light in 1552, the judge was arrested, but Anne Brandon went unpunished. By that time, her first husband had died, and she had married Randal Haworth.

Both her marriages were childless, and Anne died in January 1558, aged about 51 years. She was buried on 13 January in Westminster Abbey or in the adjacent St Margaret's Church.
