= Margaret Stanley, Countess of Derby =

English noblewoman (1540–1596)

Lady Margaret Clifford
- Countess of Derby
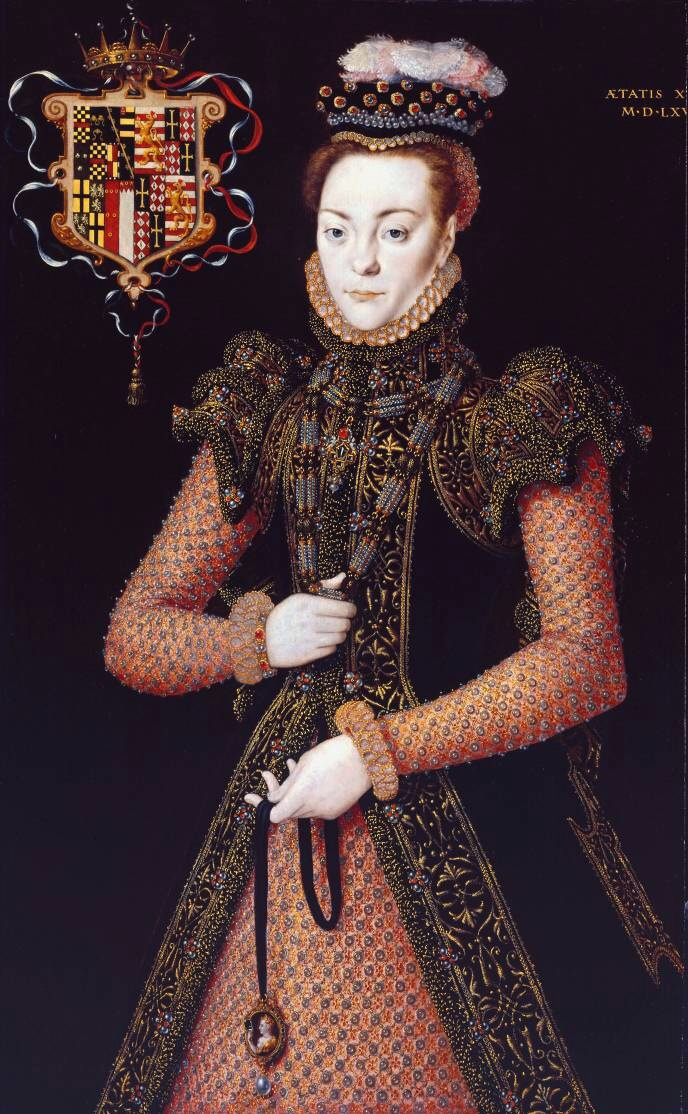
- Possibly portrait by Hans Eworth thought to be either Lady Margaret or her mother, Lady Eleanor Brandon, 1565/1568
- Born: 1540; Kingdom of England
- Died: 28 September 1596 (aged 55–56)
- Noble family: Clifford
- Spouse: Henry Stanley, 4th Earl of Derby (m. 1555; died 1593)
- Issue: Edward Stanley; Ferdinando Stanley, 5th Earl of Derby; William Stanley, 6th Earl of Derby; Francis Stanley
- Father: Henry Clifford, 2nd Earl of Cumberland
- Mother: Lady Eleanor Brandon

Margaret Stanley, Countess of Derby (née Lady Margaret Clifford; 1540 – 28 September 1596) was the only surviving daughter of Henry Clifford, 2nd Earl of Cumberland, and Lady Eleanor Brandon. Her maternal grandparents were Charles Brandon, 1st Duke of Suffolk, and Mary Tudor, Queen of France. Mary was the third daughter of King Henry VII of England and Elizabeth of York.

== Early life ==
Margaret was born at Brougham Castle in 1540. Her mother died when she was seven and her father left court.

== Claim to the throne ==
According to the will of Henry VIII, Margaret was in line to inherit the throne of England. Upon the death of her mother, Margaret became seventh in line. However, both her cousins Lady Jane Grey and Lady Mary Grey died without issue, and their sister, her other cousin, Lady Katherine Grey, died without the legitimacy of her two sons ever being proven (this was later established but only after the death of Elizabeth I). Margaret quickly moved up to becoming the first in line to the throne but died prior to the death of Elizabeth I.

== Marriage and family ==
In 1552, John Dudley, 1st Duke of Northumberland, suggested a marriage of his youngest son Guildford to Margaret, yet, although the proposal had the warm support of Edward VI, her father was against it. A year later, in June 1553, the Imperial ambassador Jehan Scheyfve reported that Northumberland's brother Andrew Dudley would marry Margaret. The Dudleys were imprisoned when Mary I gained the throne.

Margaret was bought clothes including a French-style gown of purple satin at the time of Mary's coronation. She joined Mary's court and married Henry Stanley, 4th Earl of Derby, on 7 February 1555 in the Chapel Royal at Whitehall Palace. They had something of a stormy relationship. Margaret wrote that there were several "breaches and reconciliations", but that her husband finally left her leaving serious debt. In 1567, Lady Le Strange petitioned the Queen's advisor, William Cecil, for a financial settlement from her estranged husband.In 1578, her cousin Mary Grey died making Margaret heir according to the Will of Henry VIII.

She and her husband had four children:

- Edward Stanley. Died young.
- Ferdinando Stanley, 5th Earl of Derby (c. 1559 – 16 April 1594).
- William Stanley, 6th Earl of Derby (c. 1561 – 29 September 1642).
- Francis Stanley (b. 1562). Died young.

== Disgrace and death ==
In August 1579, Margaret was arrested after she had been heard discussing a proposed marriage of Queen Elizabeth to the Duke d'Alençon. She was opposed to it as it threatened her own possible accession to the crown. She was then accused of using sorcery to predict when Elizabeth would die, and even of planning to poison Elizabeth.

Simply predicting the death of a monarch was a capital offence at the time. The countess was put under house arrest. She wrote to Francis Walsingham insisting on her innocence. She claimed that the accused sorcerer, William Randall, was in fact her physician, who was staying with her because he could cure "sickness and weakness in my body". Randall was subsequently executed. No charges were brought against the countess, but she was banished from court. She wrote repeatedly to the queen complaining that she was in a "black dungeon of sorrow and despair ... overwhelmed with heaviness through the loss of your majesty's favour and gracious countenance." She continued to be plagued by demands from creditors.

Margaret died in 1596 without having recovered royal favour, and having outlived her eldest son, Ferdinando. Her granddaughter, Lady Anne Stanley, Ferdinando's oldest daughter, inherited her claim. Elizabeth I was eventually succeeded by the genealogically senior claimant, James VI of Scotland.

== Portrait ==
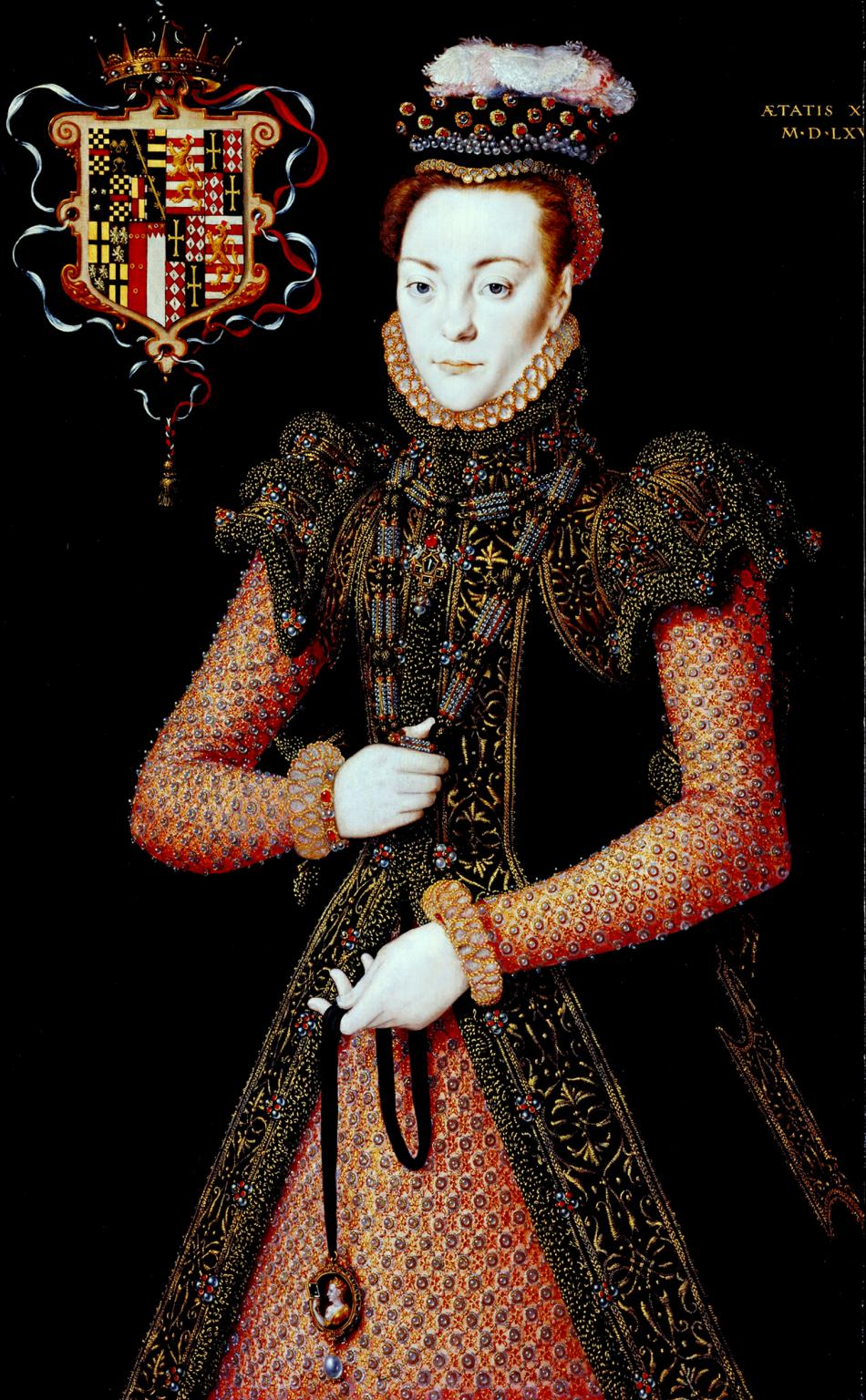
Portrait by Hans Eworth thought to be either Lady Margaret or her mother, Lady Eleanor Brandon

There is a discrepancy as to who the sitter is in the Hans Eworth portrait which is featured. The coat of arms in the top left corner, which may have been added later, are the impaled arms (those of a husband and wife) of Henry Clifford, 2nd Earl of Cumberland, and his wife Lady Eleanor, daughter of Charles Brandon, 1st Duke of Suffolk, and Mary Tudor, Dowager Queen of France. As a result, the painting has been frequently exhibited in the past as a portrait of Lady Eleanor, regardless of the fact that she died in 1547, well before the date of this portrait. It is, however, a rule of heraldry that impaled arms are not used by the children of a marriage, as they would have their own. Hence the later addition and erroneous use of the arms here suggests that the identity of the portrait was already unclear only two or three generations after it was painted, a situation by no means unusual amid the frequent early deaths, multiple marriages, and shifting alliances and fortunes of the most powerful families of the Tudor era. Later the portrait was thought to represent the only child of Eleanor and Henry to survive infancy, Margaret. The inscription on the right which might have provided a check (Margaret would have been aged 25–28 at the time of this portrait) has been truncated; although the Roman numerals of the year can apply only to 1565–8, the age of the sitter cannot be ascertained with any useful accuracy.

The National Portrait Gallery has an online sketch of this portrait identified as Lady Eleanor, but the portrait remains in dispute.
