= Henry Clifford, 1st Earl of Cumberland =

English noble

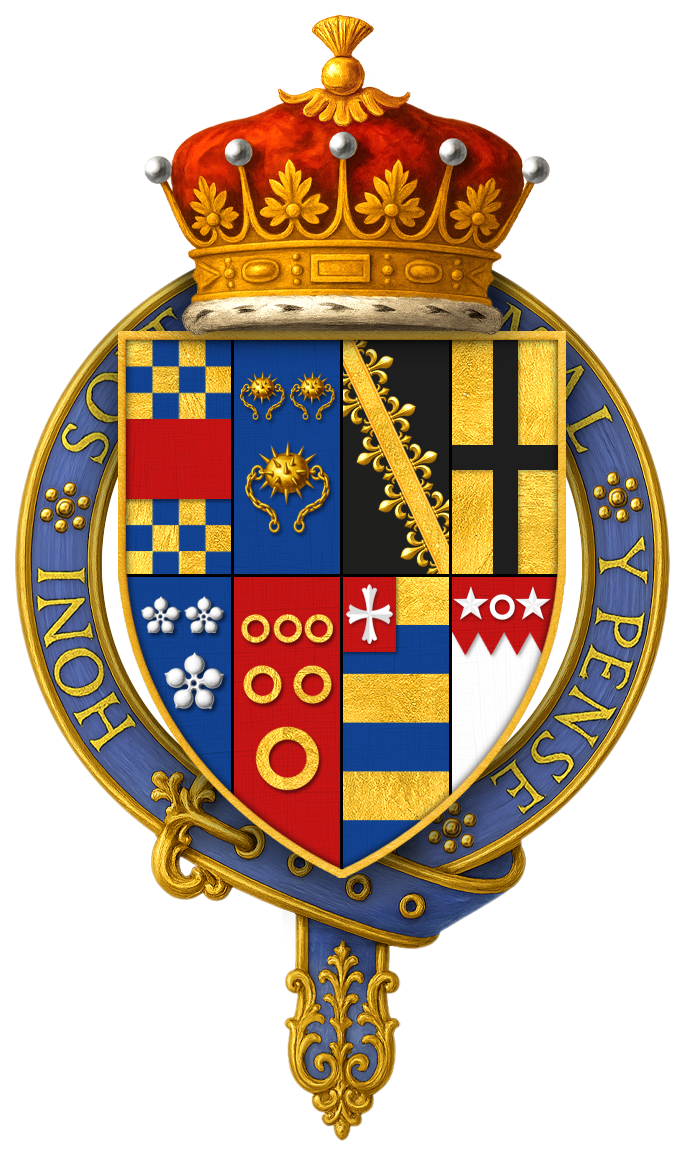
Garter-encircled arms of Sir Henry Clifford, 1st Earl of Cumberland, KG

Arms of Clifford: Chequy or and azure, a fess gules

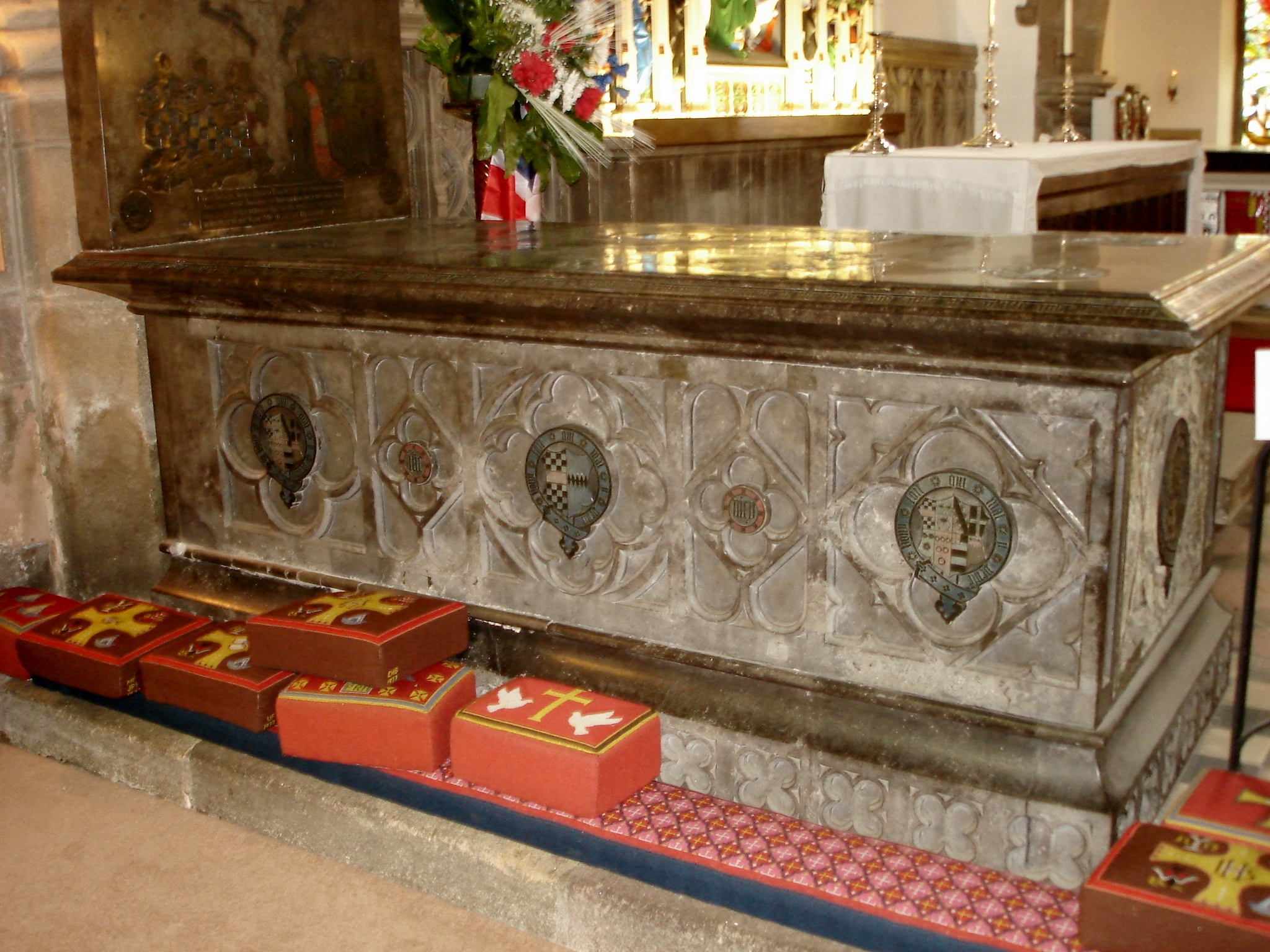
Monument of Sir Henry Clifford, Holy Trinity Church, Skipton

Henry Clifford, 1st Earl of Cumberland KG (1493 – 22 April 1542) was a member of the Clifford family which was seated at Skipton Castle, Yorkshire from 1310 to 1676.

== Origins ==
He was born at Skipton Castle, a son of Henry Clifford, 10th Baron de Clifford by his wife Anne St John, daughter of Sir John St John of Bletso by his first wife Alice Bradshaigh.

== Career ==
As a youth, Clifford spent time at the court of King Henry VIII and was knighted at Henry's coronation in 1509. He was later appointed Sheriff of Yorkshire in 1522 and became hereditary Sheriff of Westmorland on the death of his father in 1523. As part of King Henry VIII's plans for the defence of the Scottish border, he was created Earl of Cumberland on 18 June 1525 and made Warden of the West Marches and Governor of Carlisle Castle. Replaced by William, Baron Dacre, he was reinstated to the post in 1534 after Dacre was accused of treason. During the Pilgrimage of Grace he remained loyal to the crown and was besieged in Skipton Castle by the rebels. He was made a Knight of the Garter by a grateful King Henry VIII in 1537.

== Marriages and progeny ==
He married twice:

- Firstly to Margaret Talbot (died before 1516), daughter of George Talbot, 4th Earl of Shrewsbury and Anne Hastings, daughter of William Hastings, 1st Baron Hastings and Katherine Neville.
- Secondly he married Margaret Percy, daughter of Henry Percy, 5th Earl of Northumberland and Catherine Spencer, daughter of Sir Robert Spencer of Spencer Combe, Devon. By Margaret Percy he had seven children, including:
  - Henry Clifford, 2nd Earl of Cumberland, eldest son and heir, who married Lady Eleanor Brandon, a niece of King Henry VIII.
  - Catherine Clifford (1513-1598) a notable recusant, married John Scrope, 8th Baron Scrope of Bolton, and secondly, in 1553, Sir Richard Cholmondely or Cholmley.

== Death and burial ==
He died in 1542 and was buried in Skipton church, where his monument survives.

Peerage of England
New creation	Earl of Cumberland; 1525–1542	Succeeded by Henry Clifford
Preceded by Henry Clifford	Baron de Clifford; 1524–1542	Succeeded by Henry Clifford
