= Henry Clifford, 2nd Earl of Cumberland =

English noble

The Earl of Cumberland
- Quartered arms Henry Clifford, 2nd Earl of Cumberland
- Born: 1517
- Died: January 1570 (aged 52–53)
- Noble family: Clifford
- Spouses: Lady Eleanor Brandon; Anne Dacre
- Issue: Margaret, Countess of Derby; Henry Clifford; Charles Clifford; George Clifford, 3rd Earl of Cumberland; Francis Clifford, 4th Earl of Cumberland; Frances, Baroness Wharton
- Father: Henry Clifford, 1st Earl of Cumberland
- Mother: Margaret Percy

Henry Clifford, 2nd Earl of Cumberland (1517 – January 1570) was a member of the Clifford family, seated at Skipton Castle from 1310 to 1676. His wife was Lady Eleanor Brandon, a niece of King Henry VIII. After her death, he married Anne Dacre.

== Origins ==
Henry was a son of Henry Clifford, 1st Earl of Cumberland, by his wife, Lady Margaret Percy, daughter of Henry Algernon Percy, 5th Earl of Northumberland, and Catherine Spencer.

== Ancestry ==
His maternal great-grandfather was Henry Percy, 4th Earl of Northumberland, whose wife was Maud Herbert, Countess of Northumberland. His maternal grandmother was a daughter of Sir Robert Spencer and Eleanor Beaufort. Eleanor was a daughter of Edmund Beaufort, 2nd Duke of Somerset, and Eleanor Beauchamp. She was a granddaughter of Richard de Beauchamp, 13th Earl of Warwick, and Elizabeth Berkeley. He served as hereditary High Sheriff of Westmorland.

== Marriages and progeny ==
Henry Clifford married twice.

Firstly, before June 1537, Henry married Lady Eleanor Brandon (she was his fourth-cousin through his mother's side), the second daughter of Charles Brandon, 1st Duke of Suffolk, by his third wife, Mary Tudor, former Queen Consort of France. According to the Third Succession Act of 23 March 1544, Lady Eleanor Brandon was the seventh-in-line to the throne of the Kingdom of England. With her death, her daughter, Lady Margaret Clifford, took her place in the line of succession. The expenses of this alliance seriously impoverished Henry's estate and obliged him to alienate the great manor of Temedbury, Herefordshire, the oldest estate then remaining in the family. Eleanor was a younger sister of Henry Brandon (who died very young) and Lady Frances Brandon, and an older sister of Henry Brandon, 1st Earl of Lincoln (named after their dead brother). Her paternal grandparents were Sir William Brandon and Elizabeth Bruyn. Her maternal grandparents were King Henry VII of England and his queen consort, Elizabeth of York. Following her death in 1547, Henry retired to the country and concentrated on increasing his paternal inheritance, and is said to have visited the court only thrice: at the coronation of Queen Mary I, on his daughter's marriage, and again soon after the accession of Queen Elizabeth I. By his wife Eleanor Brandon, Henry had three children:

- Lady Margaret Clifford (1540 – 29 September 1596), wife of Henry Stanley, 4th Earl of Derby.
- Henry Clifford, died an infant.
- Charles Clifford, died an infant.

Secondly, Henry married Anne Dacre (c. 1538 – July 1581), the daughter of William Dacre, 3rd Baron Dacre, and Lady Elizabeth Talbot, daughter of George Talbot, 4th Earl of Shrewsbury, and Anne Hastings. Anne Hastings was a daughter of William Hastings, 1st Baron Hastings, and Lady Katherine Neville. Lady Katherine Neville was a daughter of Richard Neville, 5th Earl of Salisbury, and Alice Montacute, 5th Countess of Salisbury. By Anne Dacre, Henry had at least three children:

- George Clifford, 3rd Earl of Cumberland (8 August 1558 – 30 October 1605)
- Francis Clifford, 4th Earl of Cumberland (1559–1641)
- Lady Frances Clifford (d. 1592), wife of Philip Wharton, 3rd Baron Wharton.

== Career ==
In July 1561 Henry and Lord Dacre, his father-in-law, were accused of protecting the popish priests in the north. A similar charge was advanced in February 1562. He was in 1569 strongly opposed to the contemplated marriage of Mary Queen of Scots and Thomas Howard, 4th Duke of Norfolk, and readily promised support to the great rebellion of that year. In May 1569 he was in London. As the year wore on he gave in his adherence to the scheme for proclaiming Mary queen of England; but when the critical moment arrived he did not act with vigour, but as a 'crazed man, leaving his tenants to the leadership of Leonard Dacres'. He assisted Lord Scrope in fortifying Carlisle against the rebels. Henry is described by his daughter as having 'a good library', being 'studious in all manner of learning, and much given to alchemy.'

== Death and burial ==
He died shortly after 8 January 1569–70, at Brougham Castle, and was buried at Skipton Castle.

Political offices
New office	Lord Lieutenant of Westmorland; 1553–1559	Unknown
Peerage of England
Preceded by Henry Clifford	Earl of Cumberland; 1542–1570	Succeeded by George Clifford
