= Henry Stanley, 4th Earl of Derby =

English diplomat, and politician (1531–1593)

The Right Honourable Henry Stanley KG
- Earl of Derby
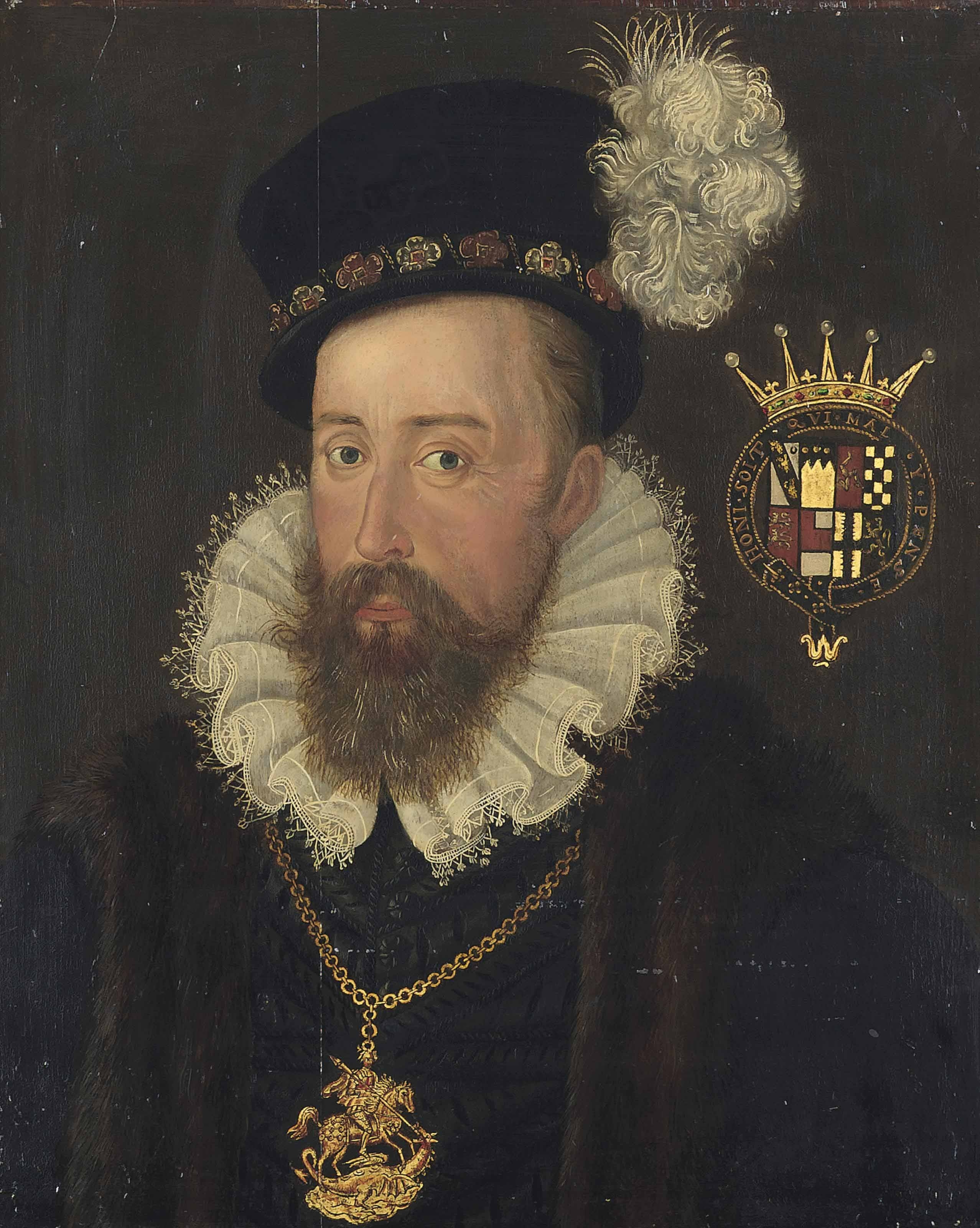

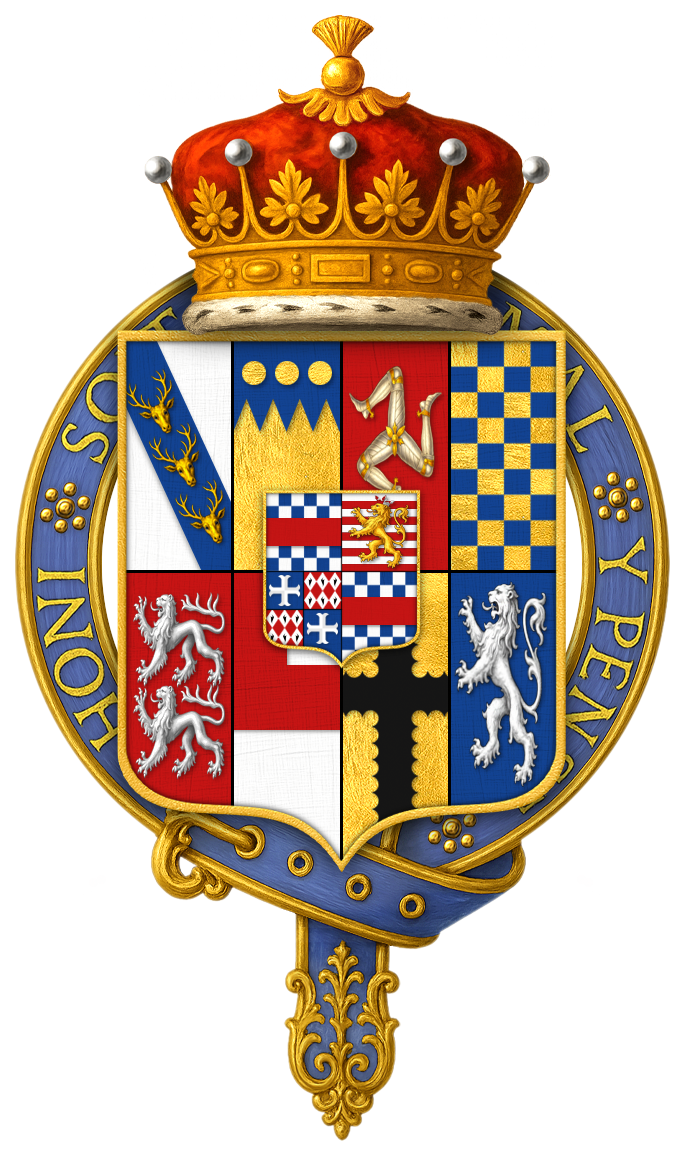
- Coat of arms
- Tenure: 1572–1593
- Predecessor: Edward Stanley, 3rd Earl of Derby
- Successor: Ferdinando Stanley, 5th Earl of Derby
- Other titles: Baron Strange
- Born: September 1531
- Died: 25 September 1593 (aged 61–62)
- Spouse: Lady Margaret Clifford (m. 1555)
- Issue: With Lady Margaret Clifford: Hon. Edward Stanley; Ferdinando Stanley, 5th Earl of Derby; William Stanley, 6th Earl of Derby; Hon. Francis Stanley; With Jane Halsall of Knowsley: Henry Stanley; Thomas Stanley; Ursula Stanley; Dorothy Stanley

Henry Stanley, 4th Earl of Derby KG (September 1531 – 25 September 1593) was a prominent English nobleman, diplomat, and politician. He was an ambassador and Privy Counsellor, and participated in the trials of Mary, Queen of Scots, and the Earl of Arundel.

== Life ==
Born in Lathom, Henry was the eldest son of Edward Stanley, 3rd Earl of Derby and his second wife, Lady Dorothy Howard. His maternal grandparents were Thomas Howard, 2nd Duke of Norfolk and his wife Agnes Tilney (1478–1545), daughter of Hugh Tilney of Boston and Eleanor Tailboys.

He was married on 7 February 1555 to Lady Margaret Clifford. She was the only surviving child of Henry Clifford, 2nd Earl of Cumberland and Lady Eleanor Brandon. The marriage took place in a chapel of the Palace of Whitehall and was attended by Queen Mary I of England and her consort Philip of Spain. They were relatives of the bride through her maternal grandmother Mary Tudor, former queen consort of France.

Henry and Margaret had four children in the next eight years, but then quarrelled and generally lived apart thereafter. In 1567, Lady Stanley petitioned the Queen's advisor, William Cecil, for a financial settlement from her estranged husband. From about 1570 Henry Stanley lived with Jane Halsall of Knowsley, with whom he had a further four children.

His father died on 24 October 1572. Lord Derby inherited his peerages, the title Lord of Mann and the offices of Lord Lieutenant of Lancashire and Cheshire.

Elizabeth I of England created Derby a Knight of the Garter in 1574. He was created alongside Henry Herbert, 2nd Earl of Pembroke.

He was appointed ambassador to the court of Henry III of France in 1580. In February 1585, Derby brought the Order of the Garter to Henry III. He was appointed to the Privy Council in 1585. He was among the chief officials of the trial of the deposed Scottish monarch Mary, Queen of Scots, in 1586.

In 1588, he was part of a mission which tried to negotiate an end to the Anglo-Spanish War following the defeat of the Spanish Armada.

In 1589, Elizabeth appointed him Lord High Steward for the trial of Philip Howard, Earl of Arundel and Surrey. He returned to Lathom in retirement in 1592 and died there one or two years later.

== Family ==
Henry and Margaret were parents to four children:

- Edward Stanley
- Ferdinando Stanley, 5th Earl of Derby (c. 1559 – 16 April 1594).
- William Stanley, 6th Earl of Derby (c. 1561 – 29 September 1642).
- Francis Stanley (b. 1562). Died young.

Henry was also father to at least four illegitimate children by Jane Halsall of Knowsley:

- Henry Stanley, for whom provision was made in the form of land at Ormskirk and at Broughton.
- Thomas Stanley, the younger illegitimate son, who received an estate in Kirkby.
- Ursula Stanley, who married John Salusbury (d. 1613); the son of Sir John Salusbury and Katheryn of Berain. Ursula and John had four sons and three daughters. Ursula and her husband may be the ideal couple celebrated in Shakespeare's poem The Phoenix and the Turtle.
- Dorothy Stanley, who married Sir Cuthbert Halsall (d. 1632), MP for Lancashire in 1614

== Ancestry ==
Ancestors of Henry Stanley, 4th Earl of Derby

8. George Stanley, 9th Baron Strange
4. Thomas Stanley, 2nd Earl of Derby
9. Joan le Strange, 9th Baroness Strange
2. Edward Stanley, 3rd Earl of Derby
10. Edward Hastings, 2nd Baron Hastings
5. Anne Hastings
11. Mary Hungerford, 5th Baroness Botreaux
1. Henry Stanley, 4th Earl of Derby
12. John Howard, 1st Duke of Norfolk
6. Thomas Howard, 2nd Duke of Norfolk
13. Katherine Moleyns
3. Dorothy Howard
14. Hugh Tilney
7. Agnes Tilney
15. Eleanor Tailboys

Political offices
Preceded by The 3rd Earl of Derby	Lord Lieutenant of Cheshire and Lancashire; 1572–1593	Vacant Title next held by The 6th Earl of Derby
Preceded by The 3rd Earl of Derby	Vice-Admiral of Cheshire and Lancashire; 1573–1593	Succeeded by The 5th Earl of Derby
Head of State of the Isle of Man
Preceded by Edward Stanley	Lord of Mann; 1572–1593	Succeeded by Ferdinando Stanley
Peerage of England
Preceded by Edward Stanley	Earl of Derby; 1572–1593	Succeeded by Ferdinando Stanley
Preceded by Edward Stanley	Baron Strange (writ in acceleration) (descended by acceleration); 1559–1589	Succeeded by Ferdinando Stanley
