= Charlotte Murray =

Charlotte Murray may refer to:

- Charlotte Murray, Duchess of Atholl (1731–1805), Scottish peeress
- Lady Charlotte Murray (1754–1808), Scottish botanist, author and painter
- Charlotte Wallace Murray (1885–1982), American mezzo-soprano or contralto singer
