= Westhorpe, Suffolk =

Village in Suffolk, England

Coordinates: 52.282°N 0.997°E

Westhorpe
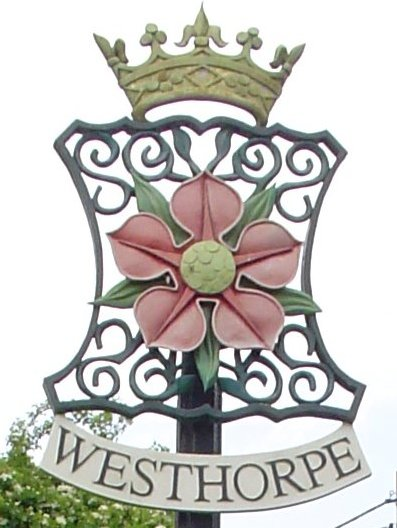
- Westhorpe village sign

- Location within Suffolk
- Population: 208 (2011)
- OS grid reference: TM045691
- District: Mid Suffolk
- Shire county: Suffolk
- Region: East
- Country: England
- Sovereign state: United Kingdom
- Post town: Stowmarket
- Postcode district: IP14
- UK Parliament: Waveney Valley

Westhorpe is a linear village and civil parish in the Mid Suffolk district of Suffolk, England. The village is 13 miles (21 km) from the town of Bury St. Edmunds, 7 miles (11 km) from Stowmarket, and 1 mile (1.6 km) from the villages of Wyverstone and Finningham.

Westhorpe Hall was a former seat of the Dukes of Suffolk, and was where Mary Tudor, Queen of France died. East Thorpe manor, its close neighbour, was the seat of a previous duke, William de la Pole, 1st Duke of Suffolk.

== St Margaret's Church, Westhorpe ==
St Margaret's Church, Westhorpe is the parish church for the village. It is part of the Badwell and Walsham Benefice.

== Notable people ==
- John Clarke (1609–1676), physician, Baptist minister, co-founder of the Colony of Rhode Island and Providence Plantations and author of its charter, was born in Westhorpe.
- Jean Kent (1921−2013), film and television actress, lived at Westhorpe until her death
