= Eleanor Clifford, Countess of Cumberland =

English noblewoman (1519–1547)

Eleanor Clifford
- Countess of Cumberland
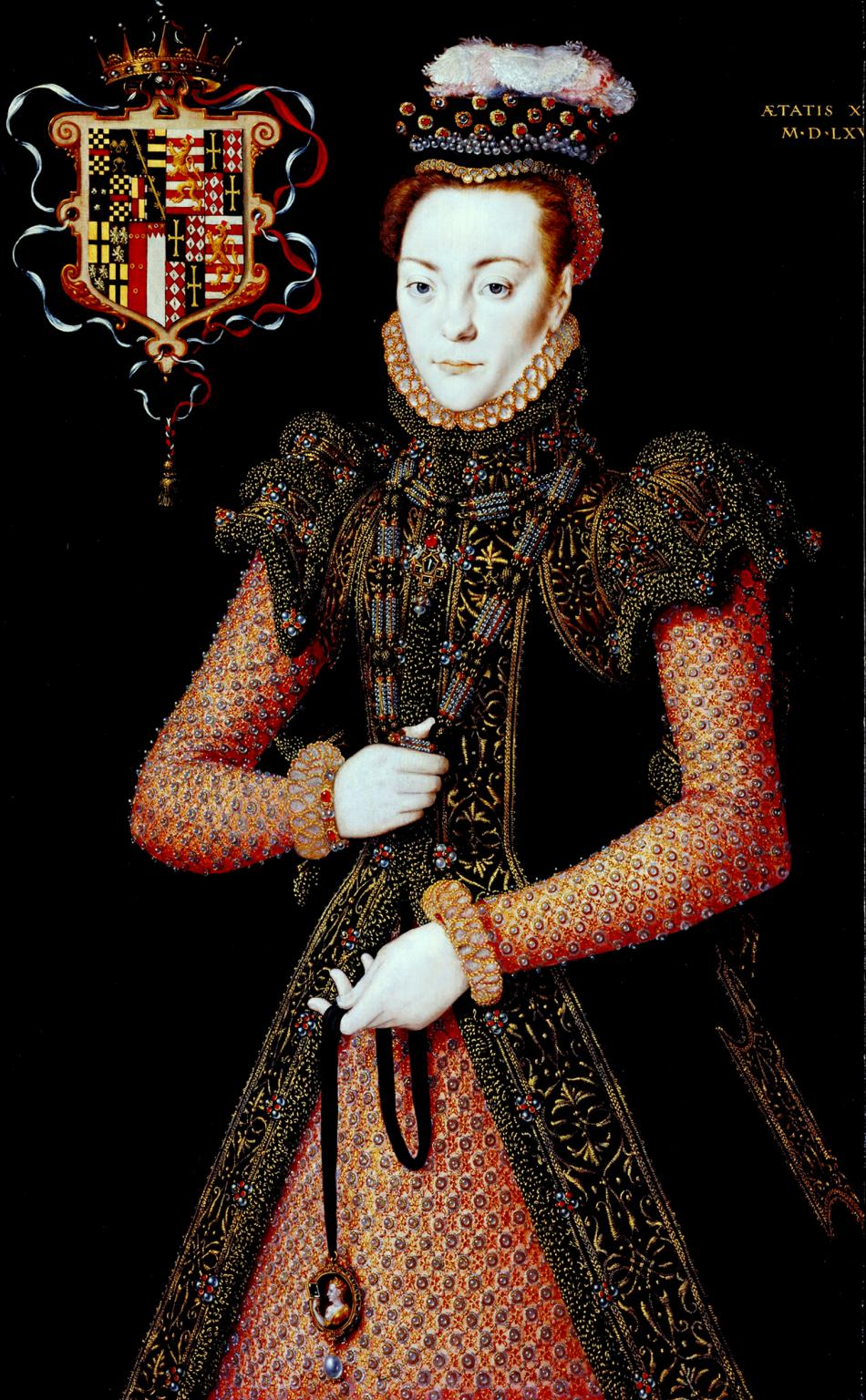
- Portrait by Hans Eworth of either Lady Eleanor or her daughter, Lady Margaret.
- Born: 1519; Westhorpe Hall, Westhorpe, Suffolk, Kingdom of England
- Died: 27 September 1547 (aged 27–28); Brougham Castle, Westmorland, Kingdom of England
- Buried: Skipton, Yorkshire
- Noble family: Brandon
- Spouse: Henry Clifford, 2nd Earl of Cumberland (m. 1535)
- Issue: Margaret Stanley, Countess of Derby; Henry Clifford; Charles Clifford
- Father: Charles Brandon, 1st Duke of Suffolk
- Mother: Mary Tudor

Eleanor Clifford, Countess of Cumberland, also known as Elyanore Clifford (née Lady Eleanor Brandon; b. 1519 – d. 27 September 1547) was the third child and second daughter of Charles Brandon, 1st Duke of Suffolk and Princess Mary Tudor, the Dowager Queen consort of France. She was a younger sister of Lady Frances Brandon and an elder sister of Henry Brandon, 1st Earl of Lincoln. She was also a younger paternal half-sister of Lady Anne Brandon and Lady Mary Brandon from her father's second marriage. After her mother's death in 1533, her father remarried to Catherine Willoughby and Eleanor became an elder half-sister of Henry Brandon, 2nd Duke of Suffolk and Charles Brandon, 3rd Duke of Suffolk.

Her paternal grandparents were Sir William Brandon and Elizabeth Bruyn. Her maternal grandparents were Henry VII of England and his queen consort Elizabeth of York. She was thus a niece of Henry VIII.

== Countess of Cumberland ==
Lady Eleanor was a descendant of a member of the Tudor dynasty and therefore her marriage would advance the political ambitions of any given husband. In March 1533, a marriage contract was written up for Lady Eleanor and Henry Clifford, the eldest son and heir of Henry Clifford, 1st Earl of Cumberland by Lady Margaret Percy. However, since her mother died nine months later, she waited to go and live with her young husband and in-laws. In anticipation of Eleanor's arrival, the Earl of Cumberland built two towers and the great gallery within Skipton Castle. Eleanor married Clifford in June 1535; her uncle King Henry VIII was present.

In January 1536, Eleanor was designated the chief mourner for the funeral service of Catherine of Aragon, first Queen consort of Henry VIII, at Peterborough Cathedral.

There is not much known about her later life and she left only one letter:

"Dear heart,
After my most hearty commendations, this shall be to certify you that since your departure from me I have been very sick and at this present my water is very red, whereby I suppose I have the jaundice and the ague both, for I have none abide [no appetite for] meat and I have such pains in my side and towards my back as I had at Brougham, where it began with me first. Wherefore I desire you to help me to a physician and that this bearer my bring him with him, for now in the beginning I trust I may have good remedy, and the longer it is delayed, the worse it will be. Also my sister Powys [Anne Brandon] is come to me and very desirous to see you, which I trust shall be the sooner at this time, and thus Jesus send us both health.

At my lodge at Carlton, the 14th of February.
And, dear heart, I pray you send for Dr Stephens, for he knoweth best my complexion for such causes.

By your assured loving wife, Eleanor Cumberland"

== Issue ==
With Henry Clifford:

- Lady Margaret Clifford (1540 - 28 September 1596); she married Henry Stanley, 4th Earl of Derby.
- Henry Clifford; died an infant.
- Charles Clifford; died an infant.

== Costume ==
An inventory of Skipton Castle made in 1572 includes a chest of clothing which seems to have belonged to Eleanor. The contents included gowns of black damask, black velvet laid with parchment lace, and of purple satin, kirtles of crimson damask and purple tissue, with sleeves of cloth of gold and black velvet. There were eleven pairs of velvet shoes, green, red, and white.

== Portrait ==
There is a discrepancy as to who the sitter is in the Hans Eworth portrait which is featured. The coat of arms in the top left corner, which may have been added later, are the impaled arms (those of a husband and wife) of Henry Clifford, 2nd Earl of Cumberland, and his wife Lady Eleanor, daughter of Charles Brandon, 1st Duke of Suffolk, and Mary Tudor, Dowager Queen of France. As a result, the painting has been frequently exhibited in the past as a portrait of Lady Eleanor, regardless of the fact that she died in 1547, well before the date of this portrait. It is, however, a rule of heraldry that impaled arms are not used by the children of a marriage, as they would have their own. Hence the later addition and erroneous use of the arms here suggests that the identity of the portrait was already unclear only two or three generations after it was painted, a situation by no means unusual amid the frequent early deaths, multiple marriages, and shifting alliances and fortunes of the most powerful families of the Tudor era. Later the portrait was thought to represent the only child of Eleanor and Henry to survive infancy, Margaret. Unfortunately the inscription on the right which might have provided a check (Margaret would have been aged 25–28 at the time of this portrait) has been truncated; although the Roman numerals of the year can apply only to 1565–8, the age of the sitter cannot be ascertained with any useful accuracy. The National Portrait Gallery has an online sketch of this portrait identified as Lady Eleanor, but the portrait remains in dispute. There is, however, a portrait of Lady Eleanor featured at Skipton Castle. It is, in the opinion of biographer Richard Davey, "very badly painted--a poor thing, worth little as a work of art, but none the less interesting." In verifying any such portraits represented as being of Lady Eleanor, it may be useful to know, "when her tomb in Skipton Church was disturbed, in the seventeenth century, her skeleton, which was in perfect condition, proved her to have been 'very tall and large boned,'".
