= John de Mohun, 1st Baron Mohun =

English noble

Coat of arms of John de Mohun, Lord of Dunster, Or, a cross engrailed Sable..

John de Mohun, 1st Baron Mohun (died 1330), Lord of Dunster was an English noble. He fought in the wars in Flanders and Scotland. He was a signatory of the Baron's Letter to Pope Boniface VIII in 1301.

== Biography ==
John was the eldest son of John de Mohun and Eleanor filias Reynold. He served in Flanders in 1297 and in Scotland. He was a signatory of the Baron's Letter to Pope Boniface VIII in 1301.

He died in 1330 and was succeeded by his grandson John, his eldest son John predeceased him in 1322.

== Marriages and issue ==
He married firstly Ada de Tiptoft, they had the following issue:

- John de Mohun, Master of Dunster (died 1322).
- William de Mohun
- Thomas de Mohun
- Reginald de Mohun
- Lawrence de Mohun
- Robert de Mohun
- Payn de Mohun
- Joan de Mohun, married John Luttrell, had issue.

He married secondly Sybilla.
