= Henry Brandon, Earl of Lincoln =

English nobleman (1523–1534)

Henry Brandon
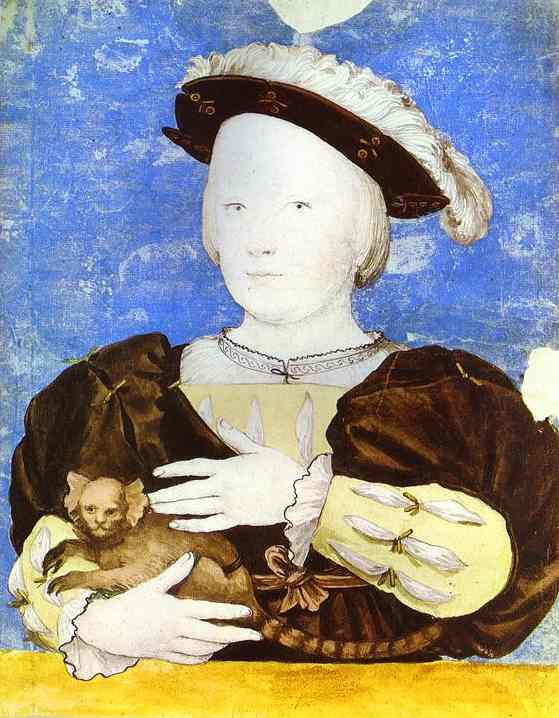
- A portrait once thought to be of Edward VI, now thought to be of Henry Brandon.
- Born: 1523; England
- Died: 1 March 1534 (aged 10–11); Southwark, England
- Title: Earl of Lincoln
- Parents: Charles Brandon, 1st Duke of Suffolk (father); Mary Tudor (mother)

Henry Brandon, Earl of Lincoln (c. before 18 June 1523 – 1 March 1534) was the youngest child and second son born to Charles Brandon, 1st Duke of Suffolk and Mary Tudor, Queen of France, who was a daughter of King Henry VII of England. Thus Henry Brandon was nephew to King Henry VIII. His older sisters were Lady Frances Brandon and Lady Eleanor Brandon.

He and his older brother (1516–1522) are often mistakenly thought to be the same person because both died as children and bore the same name. It was not unusual in Tudor times to name a child after a deceased sibling.

== Earl of Lincoln ==
Brandon was created Earl of Lincoln by Henry VIII on 18 June 1525 at the age of only two. He was "so young that Sir John Vere was appointed to carry him" during the elaborate ceremony. His father planned a marriage for him with Catherine Willoughby, a peeress in her own right and daughter of Maria de Salinas, who had been one of the queen's ladies-in-waiting.

== Role in the line of succession ==
Throughout Brandon's life, there was a small but real possibility that he would one day become king of England. At the time of his birth, Mary was Henry VIII's only child, and the king's wife, Catherine of Aragon, was already thirty-eight and had little prospect of having any more children. Next in line after the king's children was his sister Margaret Tudor, and her children, but their place in the succession was not secure – Henry would later exclude them by the Second Succession Act (1536), and by his will. Next in line after that came the Duchess of Suffolk and her son Henry Brandon, who during his own lifetime (he died before Henry's son Edward was born), was the only person in the line of succession who had the twin qualifications of being male and English. However, he died at the age of ten or eleven, in Southwark.

Brandon's mother predeceased him, and his own death created royal ambitions in his sister Frances. After the death of the Duchess of Suffolk, the Duke married Catherine Willoughby himself. Though his son was betrothed to her, at ten he was too young for marriage and also sickly. Henry Brandon's niece Lady Jane Grey eventually, and briefly, succeeded to the throne on 10 July 1553.

Peerage of England
New creation	Earl of Lincoln; 7th creation 1525–1534	Extinct
