= Mary Tudor, Queen of France =

Queen of France from 1514 to 1515

Mary Tudor
- Duchess of Suffolk
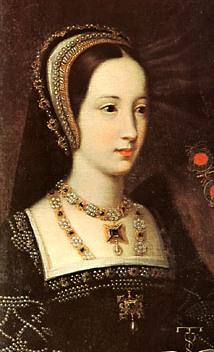
- Cropped image from the wedding portrait, attributed to Jan Gossaert, c. 1516

Queen consort of France
- Tenure: 9 October 1514 – 1 January 1515
- Coronation: 5 November 1514
- Born: 18 March 1496; Sheen Palace, London, Surrey, England
- Died: 25 June 1533 (aged 37); Westhorpe Hall, Westhorpe, Suffolk, England
- Burial: 22 July 1533; Bury St Edmunds Abbey; 1538; St. Mary's Church, Bury St. Edmunds, Suffolk
- Spouses: Louis XII of France (m. 1514; died 1515) Charles Brandon, 1st Duke of Suffolk (m. 1515)
- Issue more...: Frances Grey, Duchess of Suffolk; Eleanor Clifford, Countess of Cumberland; Henry Brandon, 1st Earl of Lincoln
- House: Tudor
- Father: Henry VII of England
- Mother: Elizabeth of York

Mary Tudor (/ˈtjuːdər/ TEW-dər; 18 March 1496 – 25 June 1533) was an English princess who was briefly Queen of France as the third wife of King Louis XII. Louis was more than 30 years her senior. Mary was the fifth child of Henry VII of England and Elizabeth of York, and the youngest to survive infancy.

Following Louis's death, Mary married Charles Brandon, 1st Duke of Suffolk. Performed secretly in France, the marriage occurred without the consent of Mary's brother Henry VIII. The marriage necessitated the intervention of Thomas Wolsey; Henry eventually pardoned the couple after they paid a large fine. Mary had four children with Suffolk. Through her older daughter, Frances, she was the maternal grandmother of Lady Jane Grey, the disputed queen of England for nine days in July 1553.

== Early life ==
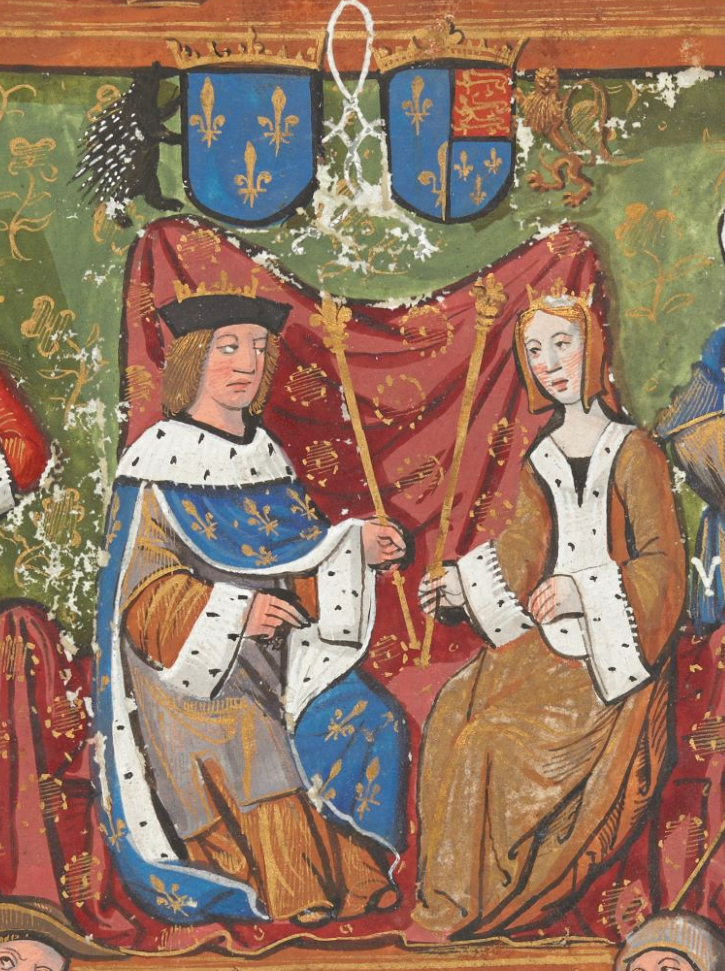
Mary and Louis XII of France, from a contemporary manuscript

Mary was the fifth child of Henry VII of England and Elizabeth of York, and the youngest of those who survived infancy. She was born at Sheen Palace, on 18 March 1496. Mary was likely named after either the Virgin Mary, or her maternal aunt, Mary of York, who died at the age of 14 in 1482. A privy seal bill dated from midsummer 1496 authorizes a payment of 50 shillings to her nurse, Anne Skeron. Also, Erasmus stated that she was four years old when he visited the royal nursery in 1499–1500. At age six, she was given her own household, complete with "a staff of gentlewomen assigned to wait upon her", a schoolmaster, and a physician. She was given instruction in French, Latin, music, dancing, and embroidery. Her Governess was Joan Vaux, who she called Mother Guildford; the two shared a close relationship and Mary was furious when Joan was sent back to England upon her arrival in France.

As children, Mary and her brother, the future King Henry VIII, shared a close friendship. He named his first surviving child, the future Queen Mary I, in her honour. They lost their mother when Mary was just six and, given the number of bills paid to her apothecary from 1504 to 1509, it would appear that Mary's own health was fragile.

She was known in her youth as one of the most beautiful princesses in Europe; Erasmus said of her that "Nature never formed anything more beautiful."

In 1506, during a visit from Philip I of Castile, Mary was called to entertain the guests, dancing and playing the lute and clavichord. In September 1506, Philip died, and on 21 December 1507, Mary was betrothed to his son Charles, later Holy Roman Emperor. The betrothal was called off in 1514.

== First marriage: Queen of France ==
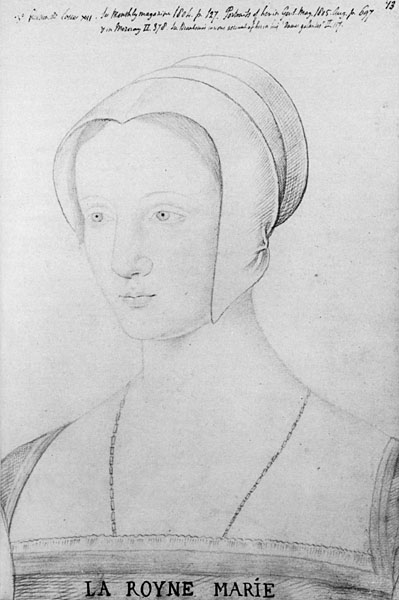
A sketch of Mary during her brief period as queen of France

Cardinal Wolsey negotiated a peace treaty with France, and on 9 October 1514, at the age of 18, Mary married the 52-year-old King Louis XII of France at Abbeville. When making a Royal Entry to Abbeville, she wore a gown of cloth of silver and an English-style Gable hood.

Mary was accompanied to France by several English maids of honour (one of whom was Anne Boleyn) under the supervision of her old governess Lady or "Mother" Guildford, who acted as her principal lady-in-waiting.

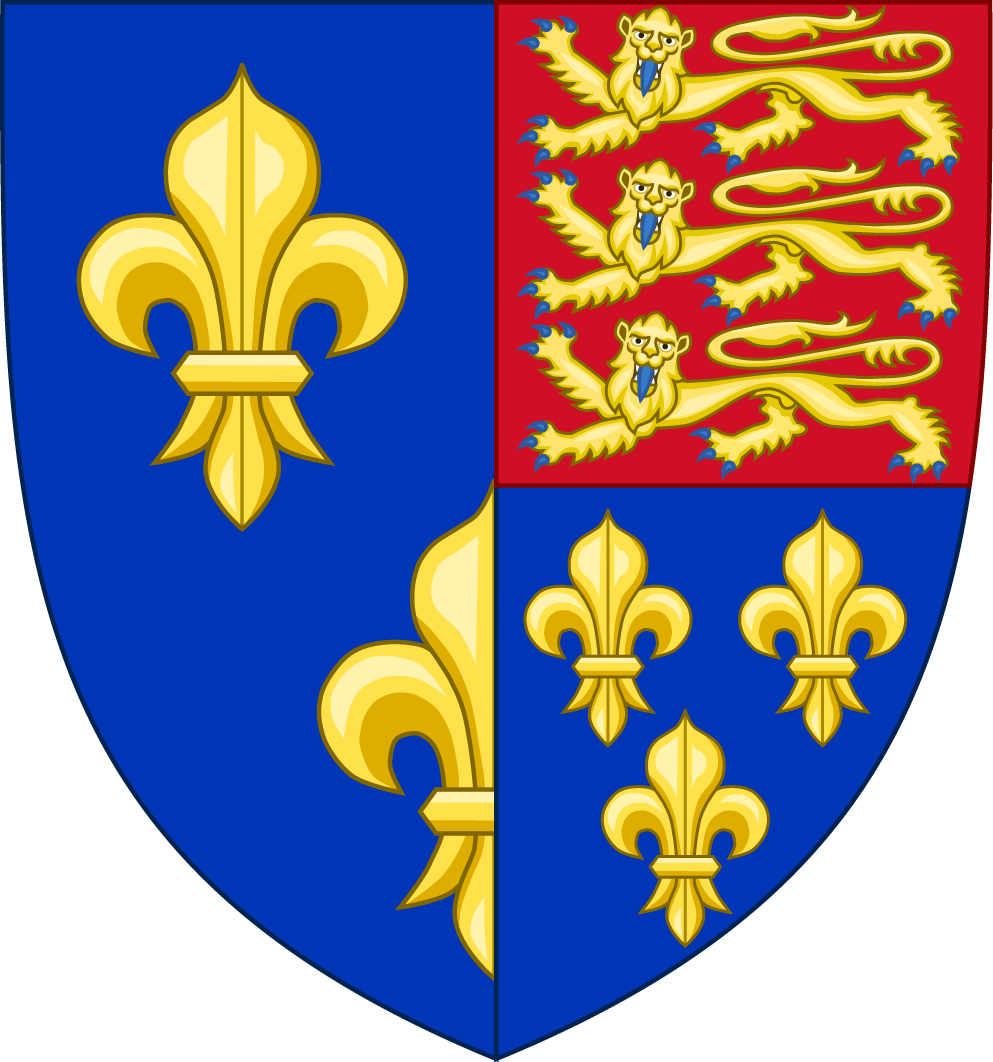
Arms of Mary as queen consort of France

Despite two previous marriages, Louis had no living sons, and sought to produce one. But he died on 1 January 1515, less than three months after marrying Mary, reputedly worn out by his exertions in the bedchamber, but more likely from the effects of gout. Their union produced no children. Following Louis's death, his successor, King Francis I of France, made unsuccessful attempts to arrange a second marriage for Mary.

== Second marriage: Duchess of Suffolk ==
Mary had been unhappy in her marriage of state to King Louis XII, as she was almost certainly already in love with Charles Brandon, 1st Duke of Suffolk. King Henry VIII was aware of Mary's feelings; letters from her in 1515 indicated that she had agreed to wed Louis only on condition that "if she survived him, she should marry whom she liked". However, Henry VIII wanted any future marriage to be to his advantage. The King's Council, not wishing to see Charles Brandon gain further power at court, was also opposed to the match.

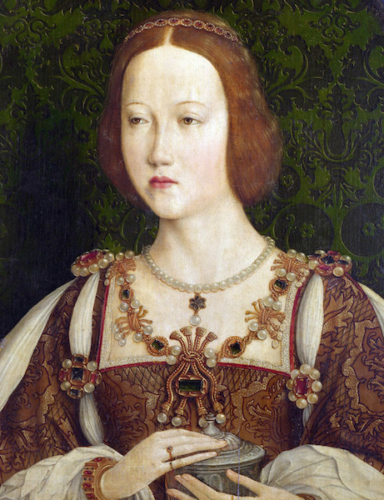
A possible portrait of Mary or her older sister Margaret, painted by Bernhard Strigel in 1520

Meanwhile, rumours swirled in France that she would wed either Antoine, Duke of Lorraine, or Charles III, Duke of Savoy. On 26 June 1515, the Duke of Lorraine married Renée of Bourbon instead. At one point, even King Francis I, perhaps in hope of his wife Queen Claude's death, was one of Mary's suitors in the first week of her widowhood; Mary asserted that she had given him her confidence in order to avoid his overtures. A pair of French friars went so far as to warn Mary that she must not wed Charles Brandon, because he "had traffickings with the devil".

When King Henry VIII sent Brandon to bring Mary back to England in late January 1515, he made the Duke promise that he would not propose to her. Once in France, Mary persuaded Charles to abandon that pledge; Charles later wrote to the King stating he "never saw a woman so weep". The couple married in secret at the Hotel de Cluny in Paris on 3 March 1515 in the presence of just 10 people, among them King Francis I. Technically, this was treason, as Brandon had married a royal princess without King Henry's consent. Henry was outraged, and the privy council urged that Charles be imprisoned or executed; Mary, as royalty and the King's favourite sister, was safe from execution.

Due to the intervention of Thomas Wolsey and Henry's affection for both his sister and Charles, the couple were given only a heavy fine of £24,000, to be paid to the King in yearly instalments of £1000; the whole of Mary's dower from King Louis XII of £200,000; and the gold plate and jewels King Louis had given or promised her. The £24,000 was later reduced by the King. They officially later married on 13 May 1515 at Greenwich Palace in the presence of King Henry VIII and his courtiers. In 1528, Charles secured a papal bull from Pope Clement VII legitimising the marriage.

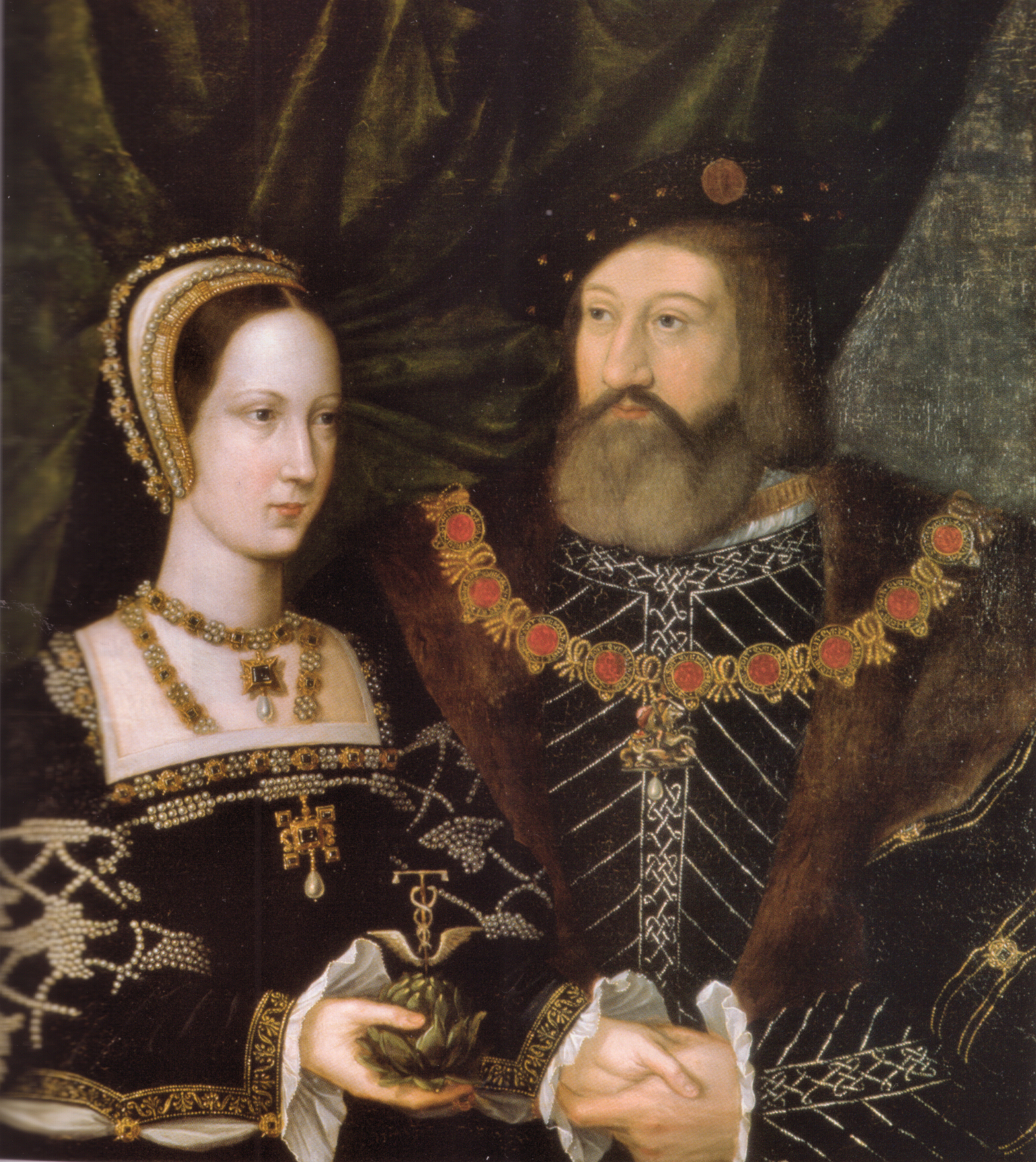
Wedding portrait of Mary Tudor and Charles Brandon

Mary was Charles Brandon's third wife, and he had two daughters, Anne and Mary, by his second wife Anne Browne, who had died in 1510 or 1512. Mary raised the girls with her own children. Even after her second marriage, Mary was normally referred to at the English court as the Queen of France, and was not known as the Duchess of Suffolk in her lifetime, despite being legally allowed to be. Mary spent most of her time at the Duke's country seat of Westhorpe Hall in Suffolk.

In the late 1520s, relations between King Henry VIII and his sister Mary were strained when she opposed the King's attempt to obtain an annulment of his marriage to Catherine of Aragon, whom Mary had known for many years. Mary strongly disliked Anne Boleyn (King Henry's intended wife), whom she had first encountered in France. Anne and her sister Mary Boleyn had been among the maids of honour in the entourage that had accompanied Mary to France for her wedding to King Louis XII.

In March 1532, Venetian Ambassador Carlo Capello wrote of an incident where

one of the chief gentlemen in the service of the said Duke of Norfolk, with 20 followers, assaulted and killed in the sanctuary of Westminster Sir William Pennington chief gentleman and kinsman of the Duke of Suffolk. In consequence of this, the whole Court was in an uproar.

Though it was said to be caused by a private quarrel, he was "assured it was owing to opprobrious language uttered against Madam Anne by his Majesty's sister, the Duchess of Suffolk, Queen Dowager of France." Anne Boleyn was the niece of the Duke of Norfolk mentioned by Capello.

== Death ==
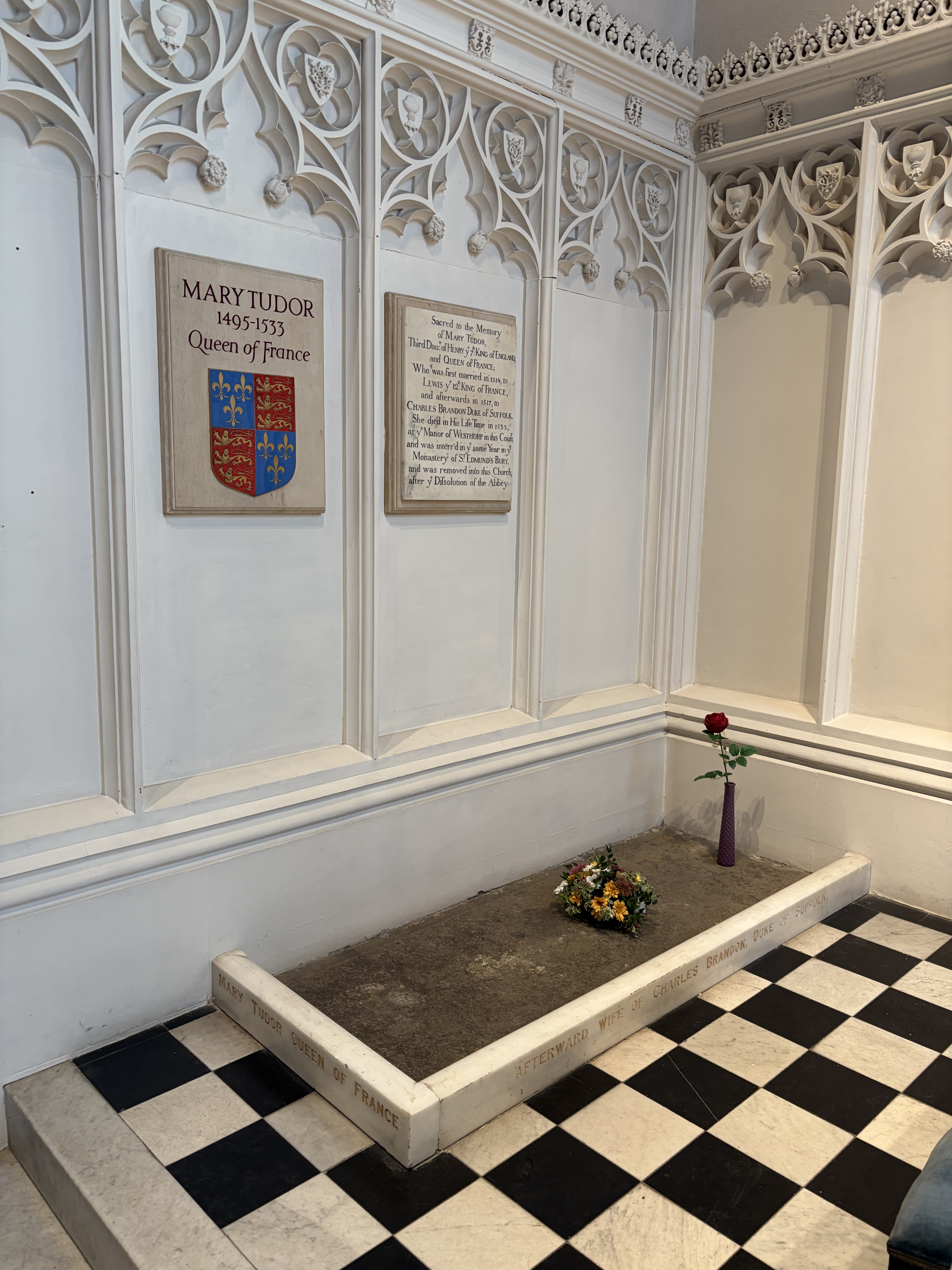
Burial place of Mary Tudor in St Mary's Church, Bury St Edmunds

Mary had multiple bouts of illness, requiring treatments over her lifetime. She died, age 37, at Westhorpe Hall, Suffolk, on 25 June 1533, having never fully recovered from the sweating sickness she caught in 1528. The cause of death has been speculated to have been tuberculosis, appendicitis, or cancer.

As an English princess, daughter of a king, sister to the current king, and a dowager queen of France, Mary Tudor's funeral and interment was conducted with much heraldic ceremony. A requiem Mass was held at Westminster Abbey. Her body was embalmed and held in state at Westhorpe Hall for three weeks. On 21 July 1533, a delegation from France joined the English delegation for the lavish funeral ceremony. Her daughter Frances was chief mourner, accompanied by her husband and siblings. As was tradition, neither Mary's husband nor her brother the king attended. The funeral procession included 100 torch bearers, clergy carrying the cross, six horses pulling the hearse, other nobility and 100 of the duke's yeomen. A requiem mass and burial at Bury St. Edmunds Abbey followed the next day. At the funeral, her step-daughters, Anne and Mary, pushed themselves to the head of the cortège just before the coffin was lowered into the crypt of the Abbey, much to the consternation of their half-siblings.

Five years later, when the monastery was dissolved, Mary's body was removed to nearby St. Mary's Church, Bury St. Edmunds. In 1784, her remains were disinterred, her coffin opened, and locks of her hair were taken by Horace Walpole, Dorothy Bentinck, Duchess of Portland, and several others.

== Appearance and personality ==
Upon her arrival in France, Mary was described as being "handsome and well favoured, were not her eyes and eyebrows too light; she is slight, rather than defective from corpulence, and conducts herself with so much grace, and has such good manners, that for her age of 18 years—and she does not look more—she is a paradise."

Contemporaries lauded her beauty, including her husband, Louis XII, who described her as a "nymph from heaven". She regularly took part in masques at her brother's court, and enjoyed "hearing singing, instrumental music, and dancing".

Mary was described as "very lively", with one nobleman noting "[she] is never still." She was also said to be cheerful and affable; this is shown when, upon meeting her future husband Louis for the first time, she blew him a kiss in greeting.

== Issue ==
Mary and Charles had four children, two daughters and two sons:

Name	Birth – Death	Notes
Henry Brandon	11 March 1516 – 1522	Died in childhood.
Lady Frances Brandon	16 July 1517 – 20 November 1559	Married Henry Grey, 1st Duke of Suffolk (then Marquess of Dorset); mother of Lady Jane Grey.
Lady Eleanor Brandon	1519 – 27 September 1547	Married Henry Clifford, 2nd Earl of Cumberland.
Henry Brandon, 1st Earl of Lincoln	c. 1523 – March 1534	Created Earl of Lincoln; died in childhood.

Mary and Charles raised their children at their home at Westhorpe Hall. Their two sons, both named Henry, are commonly mistaken for being the same son. Both boys died when they were children.

Mary's widower later married their son's (Henry Brandon, Earl of Lincoln) betrothed, who was also his ward, the 14-year-old Catherine Willoughby, by whom he had his two youngest sons.

== In literature ==
She is the main character in several historical fiction novels:

- When Knighthood Was in Flower, by Edwin Caskoden (the pen name of Charles Major) (1898), the novel was the source material for both the Davies film directed by Robert Vignola and the Disney film, The Sword and the Rose.
- The Reluctant Queen by Molly Costain Haycraft (1962)
- Mary, Queen of France by Jean Plaidy (1964)
- Princess of Desire by Maureen Peters (1970)
- Rose of England by Hilda Lewis (1977)
- Heart of a Rose by Hilda Lewis (1978)
- The Secret Bride by Diane Haeger (2008)
- Three Sisters, Three Queens by Philippa Gregory (2016)

== In other media ==
- In the 2007 television series The Tudors, Mary and Margaret Tudor were amalgamated into one character named Margaret. While the character's story is more similar to Mary's, she was given the name Margaret to avoid confusion with her namesake niece Mary I of England. Margaret was played by Gabrielle Anwar. She is depicted as marrying the King of Portugal rather than France (as Francis I had already been introduced in the show as King of France, Mary/Margaret could not be shown marrying his predecessor, Louis XII). The fictional Portuguese king lives only a few days until she smothers him in his sleep. She then marries Charles Brandon.
- In The Spanish Princess (television mini series, 2019–2020), Mary Tudor is a main character. Isla Merrick-Lawless portrays a younger version in Season 1 and Sai Bennett portrays an older version in Season 2.
- In The Sword and the Rose (Walt Disney and Perce Pearce film, 1953), Mary Tudor (played by Glynis Johns) falls for the non-noble Brandon (played by Richard Todd) and attempts to run away from England with him, but is forced by Henry VIII to marry the King of France. She relies on her friend, the Duke of Buckingham, to help her, with nearly disastrous consequences.

== Portraiture and other depictions ==
Mary's portraits and other depictions are mostly subject of heated debate as to if it is really her or somebody else, who draw or painted her or whether the painting is misdated. Confirmed depictions of her include:

- Illumination called Henry VII in mourning, c.1503–1504 which also depicts the three surviving children of Elizabeth of York on left side.
- Painting called The Family of Henry VII with St George and the Dragon, Royal Collection, c. 1503–1509 -shows Mary as second girl on right, with strawberry blonde hair.
- Illumination of The family of Henry VII with Joachim and Anne meeting at the Golden Gate, done after 1503 -depicts Elizabeth of York with four daughters behind her, all depicted with strawberry blonde hair.
- Illuminations of Mary as Queen of France-show her with light red hair.
- So-called marriage portrait depicts Mary holding hands with her second husband Charles Brandon
  - While the identities of the sitters are not questioned, the dating of c.1515 is not accepted unanimously, and later dates have been suggested. Allegedly the version from the collection of the Earl of Yarborough is the original, whilst the Woburn Abbey version is a copy. Both versions shows Mary with brown hair, probably due to darkening of pigments.
  - An engraving from 1784 is based upon the same portrait (Royal Collection; National Trust Collection).

Alleged portraits of Mary meant for Charles V include:

- Portrait of woman by Michael Sittow, traditionally labelled as Catherine of Aragon
  - Mary has been suggested instead, however while initials(K, C or E) would fit her, the author of this reidentification says that Catherine of Aragon had no reason to wear the symbol of scallops(which line the bodice) as they were not her emblem; the pomegranate was. Scallops are a symbol of St. James the Great, patron saint of Spain. Notably, pilgrimage to his shrine in Santiago de Compostela was commemorated by wearing scallops, and it is known Catherine of Aragon made this pilgrimage. The credibility of this reidentification is therefore questionable.
- The Magdalen, National Gallery, London
  - The painting shows a woman in Spanish clothes wearing jewels of the Crown of Castile, including the emerald necklace depicted on tomb of Joanna of Castile. Mary has been suggested as a possible sitter.

Many believe it is the lost painting of Queen Isabella I of Castile by Sittow, but it is not attributed to him.

- Portrait de Marie d'Angleterre in Musée des Arts Décoratifs, Paris
  - Possibly depicts same woman as in The Magdalene, in different dress, but with Spanish headwear called cofia de tranzado.

Note: on Wikipedia this painting is labelled as by Jean Perréal, location unknown. However, on the museum's webpage it is not labelled as by him but by anonymous Maître de la Reine Marie Tudor(Master of Queen Mary Tudor).

Lost depictions:

- Portrait for Louis XII by Jean Perréal
- An original portrait upon which the drawing entitled Maria Regina Fra. et D. Suffoltiae in British Museum is based.
- Drawing of Mary while in France, by either Anonymous French Master or Jean Clouet(father of Francois Clouet).
  - Nobody knows which(if any) of its multiple versions is the original drawing done from life. There are at least five versions:

2 in Ashmolean Museum, one labelled as by follower of Jean Clouet, and the other by anonymous. 1 in Uffizi Gallery -labelled as Ritratto di donna(portrait of woman) 3911 F, it is a very crude sketch by Francois Clouet, who was a child when Mary was in France. 2 more versions from Bibliothèque Municipale Méjanes, Aix en Provence. Both bear a 16th-century text(thus most likely to be original). However the picture on Wikipedia of one of them is described as not the real drawing but a print of it.

Other suggested depictions:

- Westminster Tournament roll 1511-figure next to Catherine of Aragon in gold-red dress

== Ancestry ==
Ancestors of Mary Tudor, Queen of France

8. Sir Owen Tudor
4. Edmund Tudor, 1st Earl of Richmond
9. Catherine of Valois
2. Henry VII of England
10. John Beaufort, 1st Duke of Somerset
5. Margaret Beaufort
11. Margaret Beauchamp
1. Mary Tudor
12. Richard Plantagenet, 3rd Duke of York
6. Edward IV of England
13. Cecily Neville
3. Elizabeth of York
14. Richard Woodville, 1st Earl Rivers
7. Elizabeth Woodville
15. Jacquetta of Luxembourg

== Notes ==
Mary Tudor, Queen of France House of Tudor Born: 18 March 1496 Died: 25 June 1533
French royalty
Vacant Title last held by Anne of Brittany	Queen consort of France; 9 October 1514 – 1 January 1515	Succeeded by Claude of France
