= Manx Rebellion of 1651 =

Uprising during thd English Civil War

The Manx Rebellion of 1651
Date	September – November 1651
Location	Isle of Man
Result	Manx Militia victory

Belligerents
Manx Militia; Parliamentarians	Royalists; Earl of Derby

The Manx Rebellion of 1651 was an uprising against the ruler of the Isle of Man during the English Civil War. It was led by William Christian, better known by the epithet Illiam Dhone (Brown William), due to his dark hair. The Rebellion was mainly in response to agrarian and land ownership reforms enacted by Lord of Mann James Stanley, 7th Earl of Derby, and the increased burden on the Manx people during the English Civil War. It was a bloodless coup with English Parliamentary forces taking control of the island. The Rebellion temporarily ended control of the Isle of Man by the Stanley family until the Restoration when King Charles II returned from exile in Europe.

== Causes ==
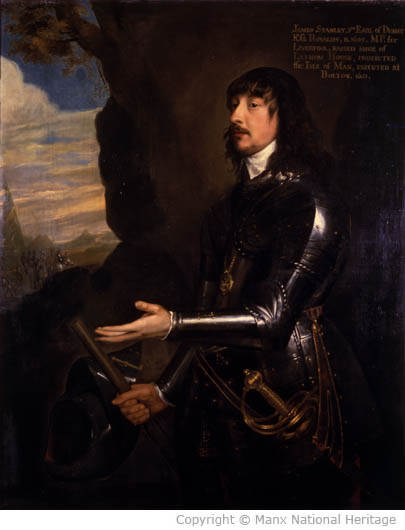
James Stanley, 7th Earl of Derby. Remembered in the Isle of Man as: Yn Stanlagh Mooar (the Great Stanley).

The ruler of the Isle of Man, James Stanley was in desperate need to improve his financial situation so he could continue to fund his involvement with the Royalists during the English Civil War. In the 1640s he attempted to bolster his finances by reforming inheritance and tenancy laws on the Isle of Man. These changes to the old feudal system of property ownership, commonly termed the tenure of the straw, were one of the primary grievances for the Manx during the Rebellion of 1651 as it placed additional economic burden on the Manx people who were already strained due to the Civil War. Stanley wanted to abolish this system as it gave tenants perpetual ownership and the right to pass their property to their children without consent of the Earl himself. Stanley complained that "men think their dwellings are their own ancient inheritances, and... dispose thereof without license of the Lord." Due to his growing influence and authority on the Isle of Man, he came to be known as Yn Stanlagh Mooar (the Great Stanley) in the Manx language.

Growing dissatisfaction over these reforms and rumours of a possible revolt against his power, prompted Stanley to return to the Isle of Man in 1643 to reinforce his authority. Edward Christian, a distant cousin of Dhone's and a former Governor of the Isle of Man was imprisoned for his role in plotting against the Stanley family.

Another significant opponent to the reforms was Ewan Christian, the father of Illiam Dhone, the leader of the Rebellion. Christian was one of the most influential politicians on the Isle of Man, holding the office of deemster 51 years, and also Deputy-Governor of the Isle of Man 1634 to 1637. But following Stanley's threat to lease the Christian family's property at Derbyhaven in Ronaldsway to John Corrin, a descendant of a previous claimant to the estate, Christian conceded and bequeathed his estate in 1643 to his third son, Illiam Dhone. It was at this property at Ronaldsway that Dhone and the island's militia decided to rebel.

== The rebellion ==
The Earl of Derby's appointed Illiam Dhone as Receiver General of the Isle of Man in 1648. The Earl left the island in August 1651 to fight with Charles II's armies against the Parliamentarians. His wife Charlotte Stanley, Countess of Derby continued to live at their residence at Castle Rushen and she and their children were placed under Dhone's guardianship, although he also gave his wife the power to act on his behalf in his absence. Crucially, Stanley also left the island's militia under the command of Dhone.

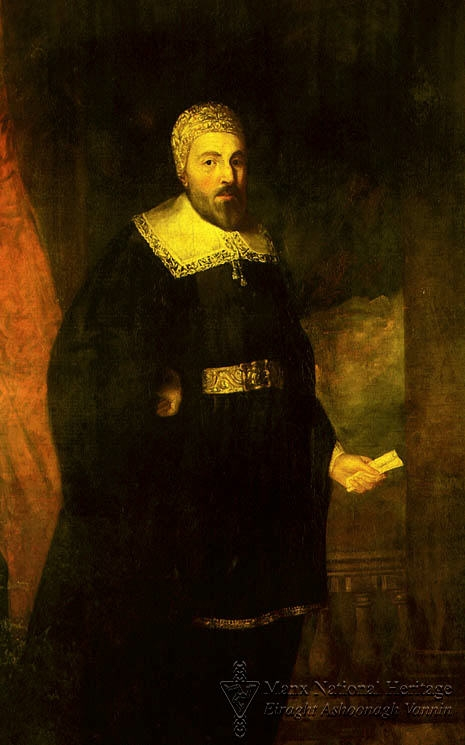
Illiam Dhone, leader of the Manx Rebellion.

=== Isle of Man surrender offer ===
The Earl was taken prisoner at the Battle of Worcester in September 1651 and in his final letter to his wife in October he instructed his wife to broker his release and for his family's safety by negotiating with the victorious Parliamentarians for the surrender of the island:

The governor of this place, Colonel Duckenfield, is general of the forces which are going now against the Isle of Man, and however you might do for the present, in time it would be grievous and troublesome to resist, especially those that at this hour command three nations; wherefore my advice, notwithstanding my great affection to that place is, that you would make conditions for yourself, children, servants, and people there, and such as came over with me, to the end you may go to some place of rest where you may not be concerned in war; and taking thought of your poor children, you may in some sort provide for them

The Governor of the Isle of Man, Sir Philip Musgrave, drew up the proposals with the assistance of several members of the House of Keys. The Countess entrusted the proposals to her servant and sent them to Colonel Robert Duckenfield.

Ultimately, the attempts failed and Stanley was executed on 15 October.

=== Rebellion ===
While the Countess brokered with the Parliamentarians, Dhone himself negotiated independently with the Parliamentarian forces.

As the House of Keys was involved in the drawing up of the proposals for surrender, many influential Manxmen would have been aware of the Countess' actions and felt that "Countess intended to save herself by sacrificing them" Following the power vacuum left by the Earl's capture and fearing that the Countess of Derby's surrender of the island would be on terms that would be less than favourable to the Manx people, as well as long-standing grievances about agrarian and land ownership reform, a revolt against Stanley rule on the Isle of Man was planned.

Dhone and Musgrave agreed to defend the island from invasion until satisfactory terms were met. In reality, the Parliamentarians were gathering troops to capture the island and the agreement was a "mere pretence for the sake of gaining time" for Dhone and the Manx militia. On the same night that the proposal for surrender was sent off the island, a rebellion led by Dhone against Stanley rule occurred. Dhone as Commander of the Militia, summoned the Captains of the Parishes of the Isle of Man to rise up and take control of the strategic coastal forts. Some 800 men were assembled and the Manx militia were successful in their attempts to take the smaller forts, but failed to take the largest castles at Peel and Rushen.

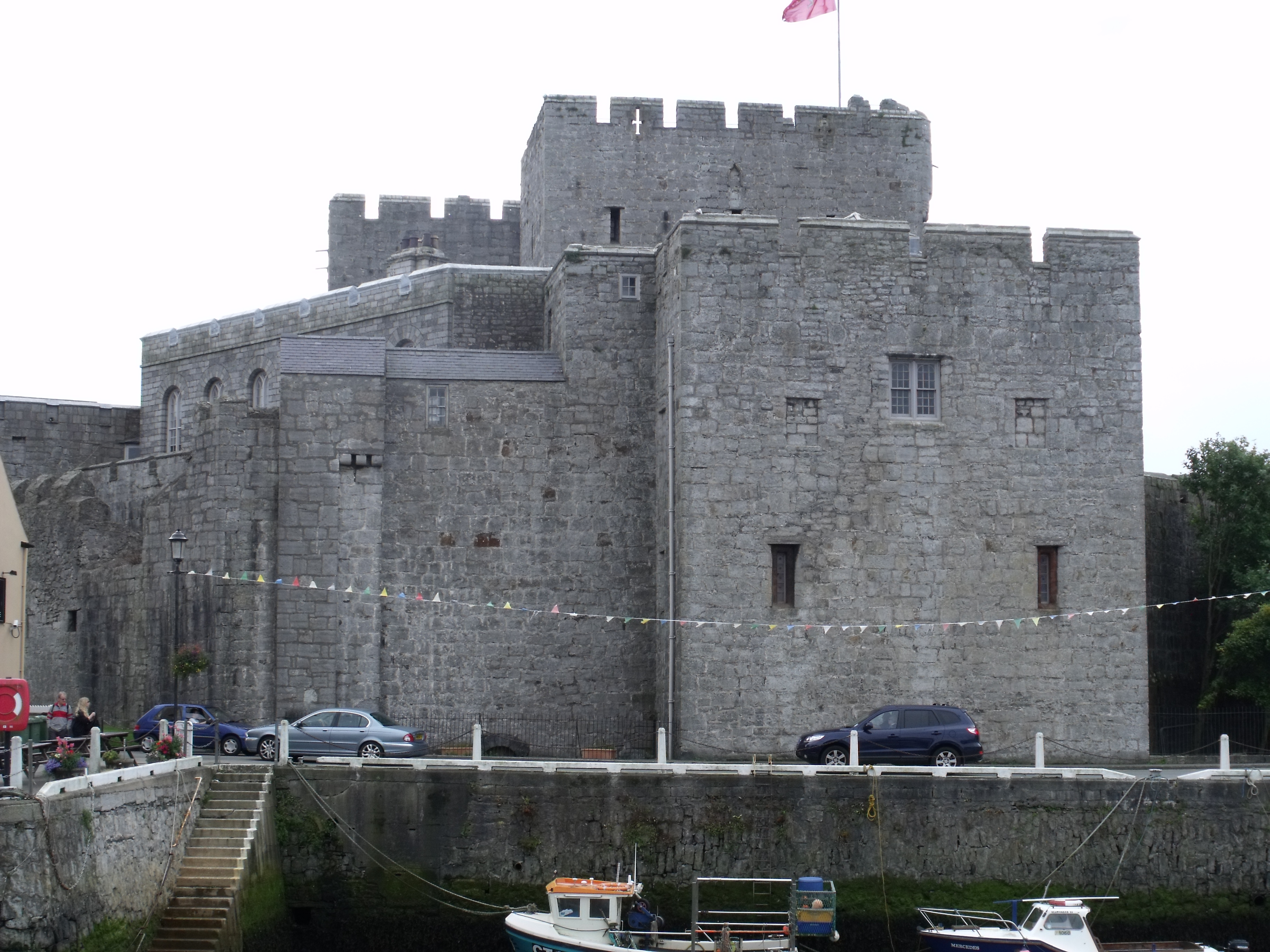
The Stanley family residence at Castle Rushen.

Despite a delay due to a storm, when Colonel Robert Duckenfield and his invasion fleet landed on the island at the end of October, Dhone and the militia cooperated and allowed the Parliamentarian forces to take control of the island, on the condition that the "ancient rights and laws" that James Stanley had attempted to reform were restored.

The Countess did not learn of the death of her husband until late October at the earliest. In a letter she received from Colonel Duckenfield dated 29 October 1651, she refused the Colonel's request for her to surrender, explaining that "I will not give it up without orders from him, being obliged by my duty to obey the instructions of my husband".

On 3 November, the Countess realizing that her soldiers could not be trusted to hold the forts, surrendered on the condition that herself, her children, and servants would have safe passage to travel to England, and then on to another safe location, thus yielding control of the Isle of Man to the Parliamentary forces, in a bloodless coup.

== Outcomes ==
Dhone remained the Receiver General of the Isle of Man after the Rebellion and became Governor of the Isle of Man in 1656. Dhone was eventually punished for his role in the Rebellion and was accused of misappropriating Manx charitable funds during his tenure as Governor and Receiver General. He fled to London where he was eventually attested in 1660. He was released the next year but returned to the Isle of Man hoping that his involvement in the Rebellion would be pardoned under the Act of Indemnity and Oblivion of 1661 under the King Charles II as part of the Restoration. Charles Stanley, 8th Earl of Derby, the eldest son of James Stanley, 7th Earl of Derby and Charlotte de La Trémouille, having described rebellion as being "a most henious sinne against God", ordered his arrest. At his trial many members of the House of Keys were unwilling to condemn him and as a result were removed and replaced by others who would find Dhone guilty. Despite the Act of Indemnity, he was found guilty and was executed by firing squad at Hango Hill near Castletown on 2 January 1663.

== Legacy ==
The rebellion and particularly Dhone's death have become a crucial figure in Manx nationalism in the twentieth century. An annual commemoration is held by Mec Vannin, a Manx Nationalist party at the site of his execution.
