= Derby Fort =

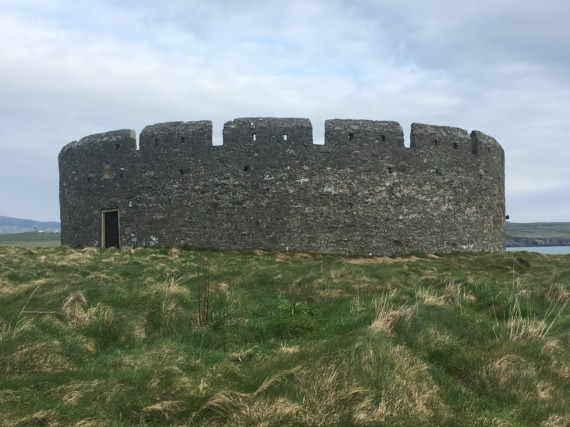
- Derby Fort, St Michael's Isle, Isle of Man

- Location within the United Kingdom

General information
- Location: St Michael's Isle, Isle of Man
- Coordinates: 54°04′30″N 04°36′18″W
- Construction started: 1644
- Completed: 1645

Derby Fort is a former military fort situated on St Michael's Isle, Isle of Man. The fort was constructed by James Stanley, the 7th Earl of Derby and Lord of Mann in 1645, during the English Civil War, to protect the then busy port of Derbyhaven. Derby Fort replaced an earlier defensive fort, which was built on the site circa 1540 by Edward Stanley, 3rd Earl of Derby, on the orders of King Henry VIII so as to protect the Isle of Man from a possible invasion by the Scots or the French.

== Background ==
For about three centuries the "great guns," smooth-bore cannon of brass or cast iron constituted an integral part of the defences in the Isle of Man. Their development in the late 15th and early 16th centuries made it possible to deny to intruders the harbours and safe anchorages of the Island until the British naval supremacy of the 19th century, secured in the Napoleonic Wars, made this no longer necessary.

Thus from 1539 until 1822 on every occasion of war or threat of war, new batteries were constructed or old ones renewed. Each harbour around the Island presented its own defensive problem, and in the solutions devised for them it is possible to see the defenders' appreciation of changing circumstances and the limitations of their weapons. Realising its strategic importance therefore, a battery was constructed on St Michael's Isle to protect the harbour of Derbyhaven.

== Construction ==
The initial structure, as built by the 3rd Earl, consisted of a round tower with an earthwork battery to the southwest. The decision to build a fort for "the defence and safety of the harbour of Ronaldsway" was taken on 22 June 1644, with work completed in 1645. Upon completion the Earl of Derby had a likeness of his own coronet engraved above the entrance.

Until the latter construction this small piece of land was enclosed by means of a shallow ditch. The earth from this ditch was not piled immediately within, to form a continuous bank, but was concentrated into a strong parapet towards the sea. This parapet ran along the edge of two flanks, but did not extend the full length of the ditch. The battery was a round tower with stone walls approximately 8 ft (2.4 m) thick and consisted of eight gun ports.

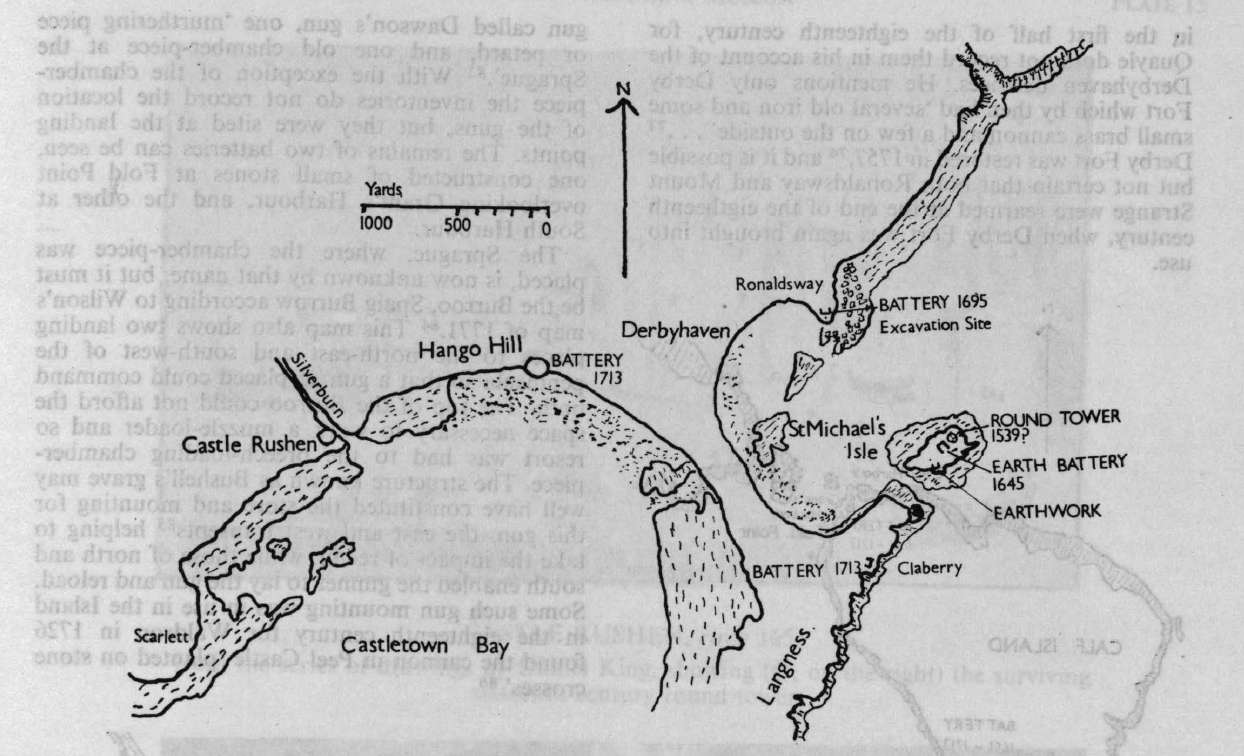
Forts around Castletown and surrounding areas, (1760)

== Military use ==
In June 1645 a royalist ship, which was lying in Derbyhaven Bay and which belonged to Captain John Bartlett of Dublin, a supplier of ordnance to royalist forces, was attacked and seized by Captain Robert Page of the bark Plyodes. The Plyodes came under fire from the guns of the fort and was subsequently taken by a party of soldiers.

In 1651 the guns of Derby Fort consisted of one demi-culverin, one saker, two demi-saker and one sling-piece. By 1694 the fort had three heavy guns, while the earthwork had one brass minion and one brass saker.

Whilst the addition of improved firepower at the fort in 1645 can be seen in a positive light, it did not however in itself solve the defensive problem of Derbyhaven. From Derby Fort to the nearest point across the bay the distance is approximately 800 yards, so that a ship in the north western side of the bay would therefore have been out of effective range. In addition to this the fort's guns could not be brought to bear on a ship to the east. To rectify these defects a new fort at Ronaldsway was constructed in 1695, and this in turn was supplemented by a further fort at Mount Strange (Hango Hill) which was constructed in 1713. Another earthwork was constructed on St Michael's Isle at the eastern entrance to the channel which separates it from Langness - although no record exists of the construction of this work nor the guns mounted within it. However the construction of a battery there, together with the battery at Claberry, would easily have been able to offer full protection to the southeast approach.

By the time of the War of the Grand Alliance and the subsequent War of the Spanish Succession, the defences of Derbyhaven were considered inadequate and several batteries were added.

== Demise ==
Following the ending of the Napoleonic Wars the forts around the Isle of Man fell into decline and subsequently their strategic importance to the defence of the Island became irrelevant. No exact date is known for the cessation of the military use of Derby Fort, but it generally regarded to have fallen into disuse by the early 1820s

== Today ==
Today the fort remains on St Michael's Isle (or Fort Island, as it is also referred to). The parapet on the northwest side, facing across Derbyhaven Bay and the shallow ditch on the other three sides can still be traced.

== See also ==
- St Michael's Isle
