= Ewan Christian (deemster) =

Manx politician and landowner

- Born: 1579; Milntown, Lezayre, Isle of Man
- Died: 1655 (aged 75–76); Derbyhaven, Isle of Man
- Occupation: Politician
- Spouse: Katherine Harrison
- Parent(s): Willian Christian; Mabel Curwen

Ewan Christian (1579 – September 1655) was a Manx politician and landowner on the Isle of Man. He held the position of deemster (the term for judges on the Isle of Man) for 51 years from 1605 until his death. He also held the position of Deputy-Governor of the Isle of Man 1634 to 1637. He was the father of controversial Manx political revolutionary and folk-hero Illiam Dhone.

== Early life and family ==
Ewan Christian was born at Milntown, Lezayre in the north of the Isle of Man to William Christian and his wife in 1579. Upon inheriting the family home at Milntown at the age of 14, he spent several years in Cumbria, where he met Katherine Harrison of Bankfield, Eastholme. They had 6 children together who survived to adulthood. He also recognised his three illegitimate children with Jane Woods.

Such was Christian's reputation for bolstering his family's influence that Lord of Mann, James Stanley, 7th Earl of Derby joked that:

someone in a pleasant Humour sayd that he thought the Deemster did not get so many Bastards for Lust's Sake, as in Policie, to make the Name of the Christians flourish.

Christian and Harrison's youngest son, William, better known as Illiam Dhone, rose to prominence on the Isle of Man during the English Civil War after being appointed governor and receiver-general. He was executed for treason in 1663 partially due to his involvement in the Manx Rebellion of 1651 and accusations of embezzlement of state funds. He is considered a controversial figure on the island today.

The Christian family were one of the most politically influential families on the island during this period. Several of Christian's ancestors also held the position of deemster. Christian expanded the family home at Milntown during his lifetime, by adding embellishments such as decorative plaster ceilings and by building a library.

He also acquired the estate at Unerigg, later known as Ewanrigg, on the coast of Cumberland around 1638. Subsequent generations of Christians would live there in later centuries.

=== Children with Katherine Harrison ===
- Mabel Christian (c. 1599 – unknown)
- John Christian (1 August 1602 – 1673)
- Edward Christian (1603 – c. 1654)
- Robert Christian (c. 1603 - 1668)
- Margery Christian (6 June 1604 – before 1654)
- Ewan Christian (1606 – 20 October 1613)
- William Christian (14 April 1608 – 2 January 1663)
- Margaret Christian (1617–1652)

=== Children with Jane Woods ===
- William Christian (c. 1618 – c. 1706)
- John Christian (c. 1620 – c. 1689)
- Jane Christian (1621 – May 1694)

== Politics ==
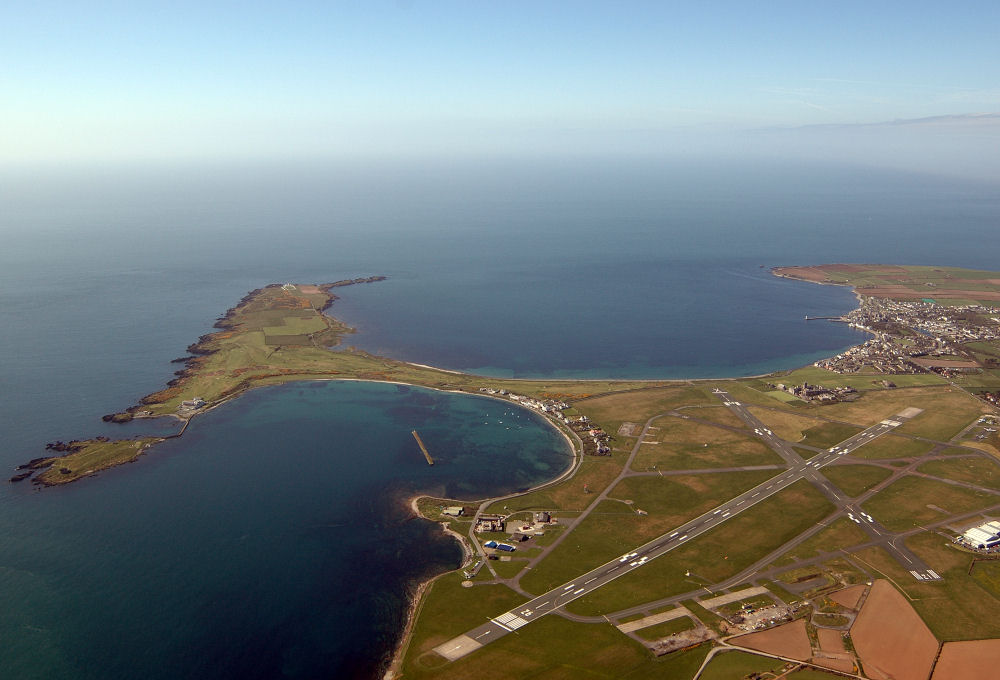
Derbyhaven on the Isle of Man where Christian's residence once stood. The Isle of Man Airport runway is visible in the foreground.

Christian was an important political figure on the Isle of Man during his lifetime. He held the position of deemster for 51 years after his election at the age of 26 in 1605, and served as Deputy Governor of the island from 1634 to 1637.

Christian was also a noted opponent of Lord of Mann, James Stanley, 7th Earl of Derby. Their dispute concerned the old feudal system of property ownership, the tenure of the straw, which the Earl wished to abolish. This system gave the tenants perpetual ownership and the right to pass their property to their children without consent of the Earl. Stanley complained that "men think their dwellings are their own ancient inheritances, and... dispose thereof without license of the Lord."

Stanley wanted to reform the system and make it a lease over three subsequent generations. Christian opposed the reform and such was his influence of the island that the Earl struggled to find someone to his petition against Christian. But Stanley threatened to lease the Christian's property at Derbyhaven in Ronaldsway to John Corrin, a descendant of a previous claimant to the estate. By way of a compromise, Christian eventually conceded and bequeathed his estate in 1643 to his third son, William, but only after his two older sons refused the offer.

== Later years ==
Christian spent his last years living in the farmhouse that he had bequeathed to his youngest son William in Derbyhaven. The residence, known as Ronaldsway House was demolished in 1940 to accommodate the development of military airfield at Ronaldsway, now the Isle of Man Airport.

Although the exact date of his death is unknown, he was buried on 20 September 1655 in Malew on the Isle of Man. In his will, Christian also provided for his legitimate living family members as well as for his illegitimate children by Jane Woods.
