= Illiam Dhone =

Manx nationalist and politician (1608–1663)

- William Christian
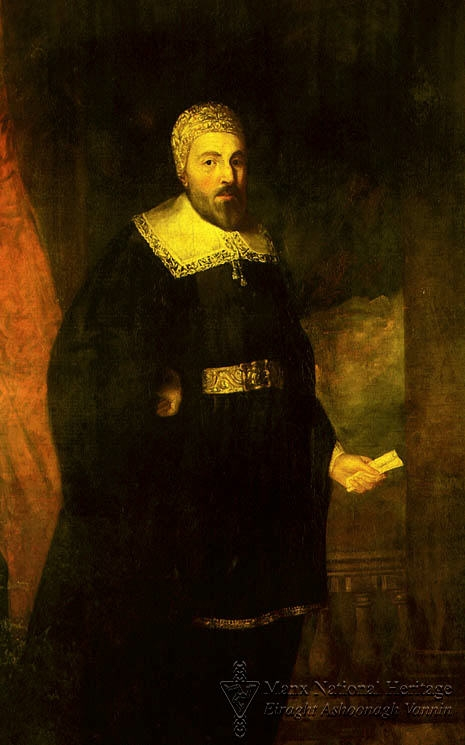
- Oil portrait of Illiam Dhone on display at the Manx Museum in Douglas
- Born: 14 April 1608; Derbyhaven, Isle of Man
- Died: 2 January 1663 (aged 54); Castletown, Isle of Man
- Occupation: Politician

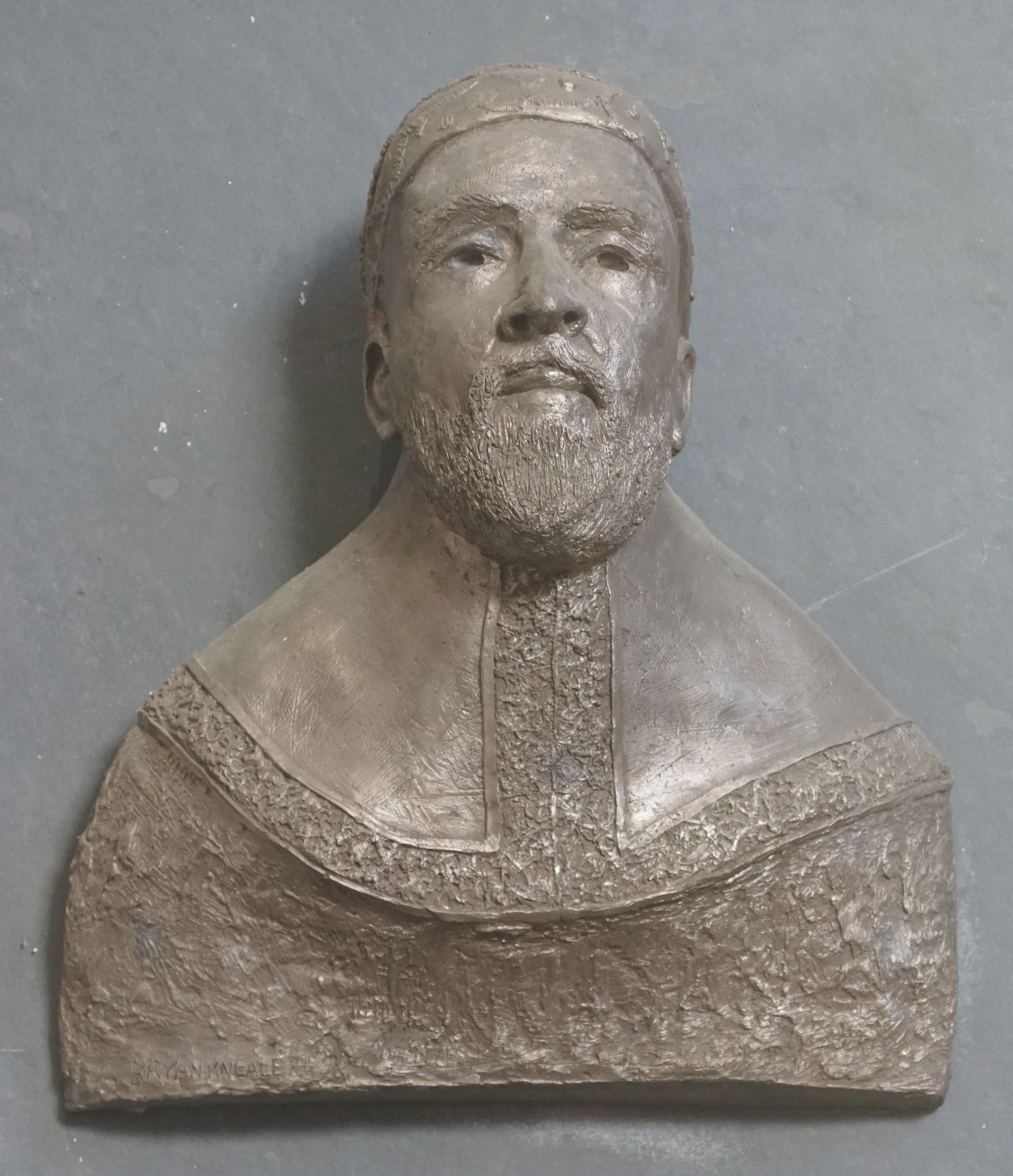
Memorial for Illiam Dhone in Kirk Malew, Isle of Man.

Illiam Dhone or Illiam Dhône (literally meaning 'Brown William' in English; 14 April 1608 – 2 January 1663), also known as William Christian, was a Manx politician and depending on viewpoint, patriot, rebel or traitor. He was a son of Ewan Christian, a deemster. In Manx, Illiam Dhone literally translates to Brown William—an epithet he received due to his dark hair—and in English he was called Brown-haired William. Dhone was a significant figure in the Isle of Man during the English Civil War and the Manx Rebellion of 1651. He was executed for high treason in 1663. In the centuries after his death he has become a "martyr and folk-hero, a symbol of the Island's cherished freedoms and traditional rights".

== Early years and family ==
Little is known about Dhone's early years. He was the third surviving son and youngest heir of Ewan Christian and his wife Katherine Harrison of Bankfield, Eastholme. Dhone was most likely born at the family property in Derbyhaven at Ronaldsway in the parish of Malew in the south-east of the island. The Derbyhaven farmhouse known as Ronaldsway House was demolished in the 1940s to accommodate the development of Ronaldsway Airport.

Ewan Christian was an important political figure in the Isle of Man, holding the offices of deputy-governor of Peel Castle and deemster, a position he held for 51 years. He was also a noted opponent of the Lord of Mann James Stanley, 7th Earl of Derby. Their dispute concerned the old feudal system of property ownership, the "tenure of the straw", which the Earl wished to abolish. This system gave the tenants perpetual ownership and the right to pass their property to their children without the consent of the Lord of Mann. Stanley wanted to reform the system and make it a lease over three generations. Ewan Christian opposed the reform, but Stanley threatened to lease the Christians' property at Ronaldsway to John Corrin, a descendant of a previous claimant to the estate. Ewan Christian eventually conceded and bequeathed his estate in 1643 to his third son, William.

Edward Christian, a distant cousin of Dhone's and the Governor of the Isle of Man, was imprisoned for plotting against the Stanley family in 1643. He was imprisoned for eight years until James Stanley was executed in 1651, but in 1659 he was once again imprisoned for treason in Peel Castle, where he died years later.

== Manx rebellion of 1651 ==
In 1648 Stanley appointed Dhone as Receiver General, despite his previous difficulties with Dhone's father. In 1651 Stanley went to England to fight for Charles II against the Parliamentarians. Dhone was left in command of the island militia, and Stanley's wife Charlotte Stanley, Countess of Derby, who was now residing at Castle Rushen on the island, was left under his guardianship, highlighting the trust Stanley placed in Dhone.

Stanley was taken prisoner at the Battle of Worcester in September 1651. In a letter to his wife in October, Stanley instructed her to broker his release by negotiating with the victorious Parliamentarians for the surrender of the island. Ultimately she was unsuccessful, and her husband was executed on 15 October. Dhone and the Manx militia suspected that the Countess may have been attempting to negotiate with Parliamentarians for control of the island. Fearing that the terms of the surrender would leave the Island at a great disadvantage, Dhone negotiated independently with the Parliamentarians, agreeing that they would not resist their invasion fleet on the condition that the "ancient rights and laws" that Stanley had attempted to reform were restored.

The countess' attempt to barter freedom for her husband in return for the surrender of the Isle of Man led to a revolt headed by Dhone, the Manx Rebellion of 1651. This revolt was partly as a consequence of this step and partly due to discontent caused by the same agrarian reforms introduced by Stanley that Dhone's father has previously opposed, as well as the burden on the Manx people due to the free quarterage of soldiers stationed on the island. 800 men were assembled at Dhone's property in Ronaldsway. The militia were successful in their attempts to take the smaller forts, but failed to take the two largest castles at Peel and Castletown. When the parliamentary fleet under Colonel Robert Duckenfield landed in the Isle of Man in late October 1651, the Manx militia cooperated.

Fearing that her soldiers could not be trusted, the Countess of Derby was compelled to surrender the two castles, Castle Rushen and Peel Castle. Dhone remained Receiver General. He then was appointed Governor of the Isle of Man in 1656: the highest point of his career.

== Imprisonment and trial ==
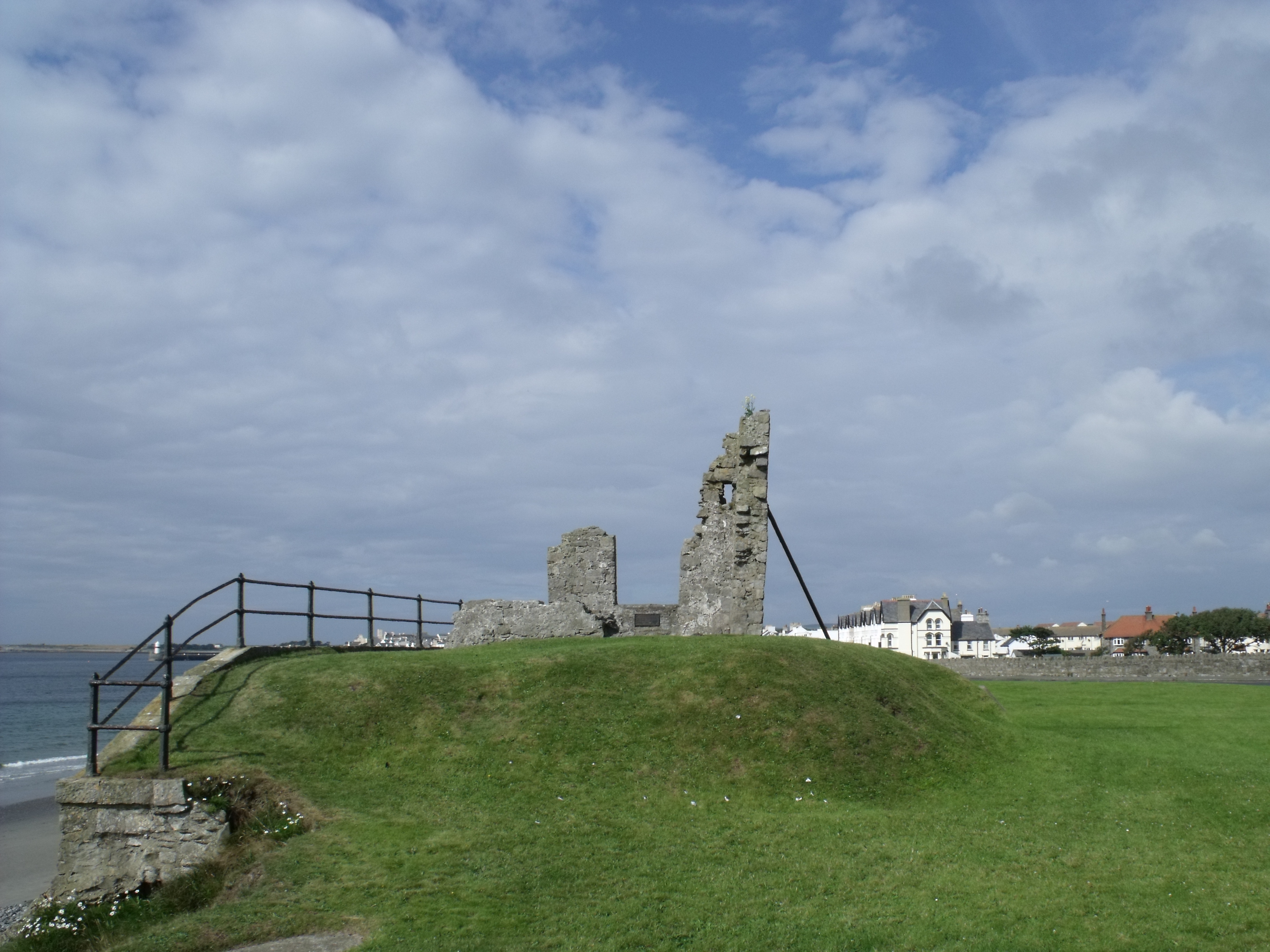
Hango Hill, the site of Dhone's botched execution.

Dhone's position as both Governor and Receiver General of the Isle of Man gave him unequalled control of the island's finances. Two years later, in 1658, Dhone was charged by James Chaloner, the new Governor of the island, of misappropriating funds that were reserved for the support of the grammar schools and for the augmentation of the salary of poorer clergy on the island. Facing imprisonment, Dhone and his eldest son George fled to England. Dhone's estates were confiscated and his brother Deemster John Christian was imprisoned for helping him to escape the island. Dhone was eventually arrested in London in 1660. After serving a year of imprisonment he returned to Mann, hoping that his offence against the Earl of Derby would be condoned under the Act of Indemnity of 1661; but, anxious to punish his conduct, Charles Stanley, 8th Earl of Derby ordered his arrest. At his trial, Dhone refused to plead, and the House of Keys declared that his life and property were at the mercy of the Lord of Mann. The Deemsters then passed sentence, and Dhone was executed by shooting at Hango Hill (near what is now Janet's Corner, Castletown), on 2 January 1663 on charges of high treason. The execution was botched but he died of his injuries.

== Aftermath and legacy ==
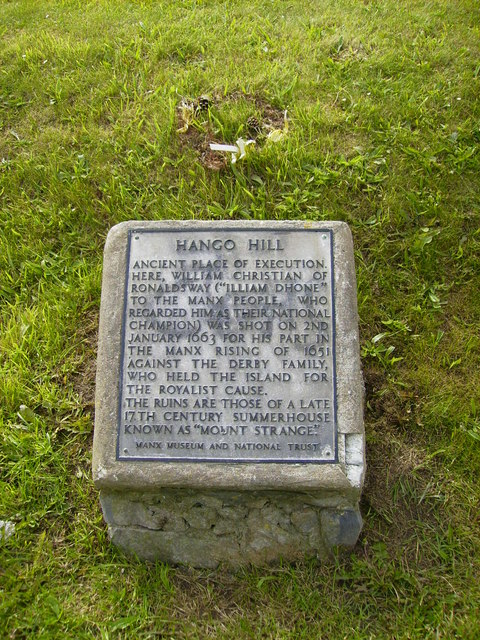
The commemorative plaque on Hango Hill near Castletown at the site of Dhone's execution.

This arbitrary act angered King Charles II and his advisers. The deemsters and others were punished, and some reparation was made to the Dhone family. Dhone is chiefly celebrated through the Manx ballad Baase Illiam Dhône, which was translated into English by John Crellin in 1774 (and separately by George Borrow), and through the references to him in Sir Walter Scott's Peveril of the Peak.

An annual commemoration is held by Mec Vannin and the Manx branch of the Celtic League at the site of his execution.

Dhone is a controversial figure in Manx history: some view him as a traitor, while others view him as a patriotic martyr who stood up for the rights of the Manx people.

The headquarters of the Office of Human Resources of the Isle of Man Government is known as Illiam Dhone House.

In January 2006 a monument created by Bryan Kneale dedicated to Dhone was erected at Malew Church, where Dhone is buried.
