= Manx revolt of 1275 =

Manx revolt

Date	1275
Location	Mann
Result	Revolt put down by Scots

Belligerents
Crovan dynasty	Scottish Crown

Commanders and leaders
Godred Magnusson	Alexander III

The Manx revolt of 1275 was an uprising on the Isle of Man in 1275, led by Guðrøðr Magnússon. The uprising initially expelled the Scots, who had received the Isle of Man in 1266 by the Treaty of Perth from the Kingdom of Norway. King Alexander III of Scotland responded by sending a large fleet and troops to crush the rebellion.

== Background ==
Alexander III of Scotland, undertook a campaign to renew his kingdom's struggle to wrest the Hebridean region and Isle of Man from Norwegian overlordship. In so doing, Alexander III provoked a retaliatory military response from Haakon IV of Norway, resulting in the Battle of Largs and Haakon's wintering at Orkney. The campaign ultimately ended in failure with the latter's weakening health and death in 1263.

With Haakon's death Alexander III seized the initiative, and oversaw a series of invasions into the Isles and northern Scotland. Recognising this dramatic shift in royal authority, Magnús Óláfsson, King of Mann and the Isles, submitted to Alexander III within the year, and in so doing, symbolised the complete collapse of Norwegian sovereignty in the Isles. The following year, Magnús died without a legitimate heir to succeed him. In 1266, Alexander III peacefully secured the Hebrides and Mann from Hákon's son and successor, Magnús Hákonarson, King of Norway (died 1280), by way of the Treaty of Perth.

Following the conclusion of the treaty, Alexander III entrusted control of Mann into the hands of royal officials. Four such bailiffs or justiciars are known to have been appointed to govern the island: a certain "Godredus Mac Mares"; Alan, illegitimate son of Thomas fitz Roland, Earl of Atholl (died 1231); a certain "Mauricius Okarefair" / "Mauricio Acarsan"; and Reginald, the king's chaplain. (Note: The name borne by the first official could be evidence that this man was an Islesman or Gallovidian.) Scottish exchequer records also reveal that the Scottish Crown held several Manx hostages as a means to ensure order on the island.

== Revolt ==
Guðrøðr Magnússon led a revolt on the island against the Scottish Crown, taking possession of the island's strongholds and ejecting the Scottish representatives in the process.

== Scottish response ==
Alexander III, King of Scotland quickly responded by sending a great fleet, drawn from the Hebrides and Galloway, to invade the island and restore Scottish royal authority. The commanders of this enterprise were: John de Vesci (died 1289), John I Comyn, Lord of Badenoch (died c. 1277), Alan, an illegitimate son of Thomas fitz Roland, Earl of Atholl, Alasdair Mac Dubhghaill, Lord of Argyll (died 1310), and Ailéan mac Ruaidhrí (died ×1296). The identities of these men suggest that the Scottish force was composed of a small component of heavily armed knights, a contingent of infantry troops levied from the common army of Galloway, and a fleet of galleys gathered from the Hebrides. (Note: The expedition was evidently a personal affair for Alasdair, as his sister, Máire (died 1302), was the widow of Guðrøðr's father.)

The Scots made landfall on the southern shores of Mann. According to the Chronicle of Lanercost and the Chronicle of Mann, the invaders first attempted to resolve the uprising peaceably, demanding that the rebels stand down and submit to Alexander III.

Battle of Ronaldsway

The account preserved in the Chronicle of Lanercost and the Chronicle of Mann suggest that lightly armed and poorly trained rebels were soundly crushed by well-armed Scottish warriors, with the Annals of Lanerost declaring that "the wretched Manxmen turned their backs, and perished miserably". Although the Chronicle of Mann specifies that five hundred and thirty seven people were slaughtered by the Scots, it is possible that this tally owes itself to contemporary poetic convention, as the source further quotes the following rhyming lament: "ten times fifty, three times ten and five and two did fall; O Manx race, beware lest future catastrophe you befall". (Note: The passage reads in Latin: "L. decies, X. ter, et penta duo cecidere, Mannica gens de te dampna futura cave".) Although Guðrøðr may have died in the defeat, the continuation of Historia rerum Anglicarum reports that he and his wife managed to escape the carnage on Mann, and fled to Wales. If correct, this source is one of several that demonstrate strong connections between the Crovan dynasty and Wales spanning the eleventh and thirteenth centuries.

== Aftermath ==
Scotland's rule over the Isle of Man was confirmed after putting down the revolt, however Scottish rule was not long-lasting, and in 1290 the Manx was under the possession of Edward I of England after an expedition by Walter de Huntercombe. The Isle of Man remained in English hands until 1313, when Robert I of Scotland took it after besieging Castle Rushen for five weeks. A confused period followed when Man was sometimes under English rule and sometimes Scottish, until 1346, when the Battle of Neville's Cross decided the long struggle between England and Scotland in England's favour.
