= Countess of Strathearn =

Countess of Strathearn may refer to:

- Any of the wives of the holders of the title Earl of Strathearn, currently Catherine, Princess of Wales (born 1982), wife of William, Prince of Wales
- Euphemia Stewart, Countess of Strathearn (b. before 1375 – d. 1434)
- Maria de Ergadia (d. 1302), Queen consort of Mann and the Isles
