= Magnús Óláfsson =

- King of Mann and the Isles
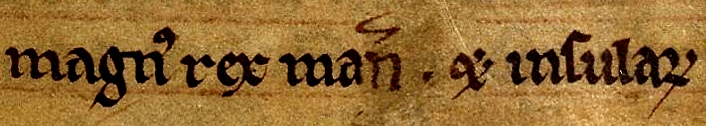
- Magnús' name and title as it appears on folio 49r. of British Library Cotton MS Julius A VII (the Chronicle of Mann): magnus rex manniæ et insularum.

King of Mann and the Isles
- Reign: 1254–1265
- Predecessor: Haraldr Guðrøðarson
- Successor: Manx monarchy abolished
- Died: 24 November 1265; Castle Rushen
- Burial: Abbey of St Mary of Rushen
- Spouse: Máire Nic Dubhghaill
- Issue: Guðrøðr Magnússon
- House: Crovan dynasty
- Father: Óláfr Guðrøðarson

Magnús Óláfsson (died 24 November 1265) was a King of Mann and the Isles. He was a son of Óláfr Guðrøðarson, King of the Isles, and a member of the Crovan dynasty. Magnús' realm encompassed Mann and parts of the Hebrides. Some leading members of Magnús' family—such as his father—styled themselves "King of the Isles"; other members—such as Magnús and his brothers—styled themselves "King of Mann and the Isles". Although kings in their own right, leading members of the Crovan dynasty paid tribute to the Kings of Norway and generally recognised a nominal Norwegian overlordship of Mann and the Hebrides. Magnus was forced to cede lordship of the Isle of Mann to King Alexander III and swear fealty to him in 1264 after the Battle of Largs between the Norwegians and Scots after which the Norwegians retreated to Orkney.

In 1237, Óláfr died and was succeeded by his elder son, Haraldr, who later drowned in 1248. The kingship was then taken up by his brother, Rǫgnvaldr Óláfsson. After a reign of only weeks, Rǫgnvaldr was slain and the kingship was taken up by Haraldr Guðrøðarson, a descendant of Óláfr's half-brother and deadly rival, Rǫgnvaldr Guðrøðarson, King of the Isles. After a short reign, this Haraldr was removed from power by his overlord, Hákon Hákonarson, King of Norway. In Haraldr's absence, Magnús and a relation of his, Eóghan Mac Dubhghaill, King in the Isles, unsuccessfully attempted to conquer Mann. A few years later, Magnús successfully made his return to the island and was proclaimed king.

In the 1240s, following attempts to purchase the Isles from Hákon, Alexander II of Scotland resorted to warfare to win the region. His death in 1249 brought an abrupt end to his westward invasion, and it was not until the 1260s that a Scottish king again attempted to impose his authority into the Isles. In 1261, Alexander II's son and successor, Alexander III, attempted to purchase the Isles without success, before Scottish forces raided into the Hebrides. Hákon's response to Scottish aggression was to organise a massive fleet to re-assert Norwegian authority. In the summer of 1263, the fleet sailed down through the Hebrides. Although his forces gained strength as they sailed southwards, the Norwegian king received only lukewarm support from many of his Norse-Gaelic vassals—in fact, Magnús was one of the few who came out whole-heartedly for Hákon. At one point during the campaign, Hákon sent Magnús and some other vassals raiding deep into Lennox. Meanwhile, the main Norwegian force was occupied with the Battle of Largs—a famous, but inconclusive series of skirmishes against the Scots. Following this action, Hákon's demoralised fleet returned home having accomplished little. Not long after Hákon's departure and death, Alexander launched a punitive expedition into the Hebrides, and threatened Mann with the same. Magnús' subsequent submission to the Scottish king, and the homage rendered for his lands, symbolises the failure of Hákon's campaign, and marks the complete collapse of Norwegian influence in the Isles.

Magnús, the last reigning king of his dynasty, died at Castle Rushen in 1265, and was buried at the Abbey of St Mary of Rushen. At the time of his death, he was married to Eóghan's daughter Máire. In the year after his death, the Hebrides and Mann were formally ceded by King of Norway to the King of Scots. Ten years after Magnús' death, Guðrøðr, a bastard son of his attempted to establish himself as king on Mann. Guðrøðr's revolt was quickly and brutally crushed by Scottish forces, and the island remained part of the Kingdom of Scotland. By the 1290s, the Hebridean portion of Magnús' former island-kingdom had been incorporated into a newly created Scottish sheriffdom.

== Background ==
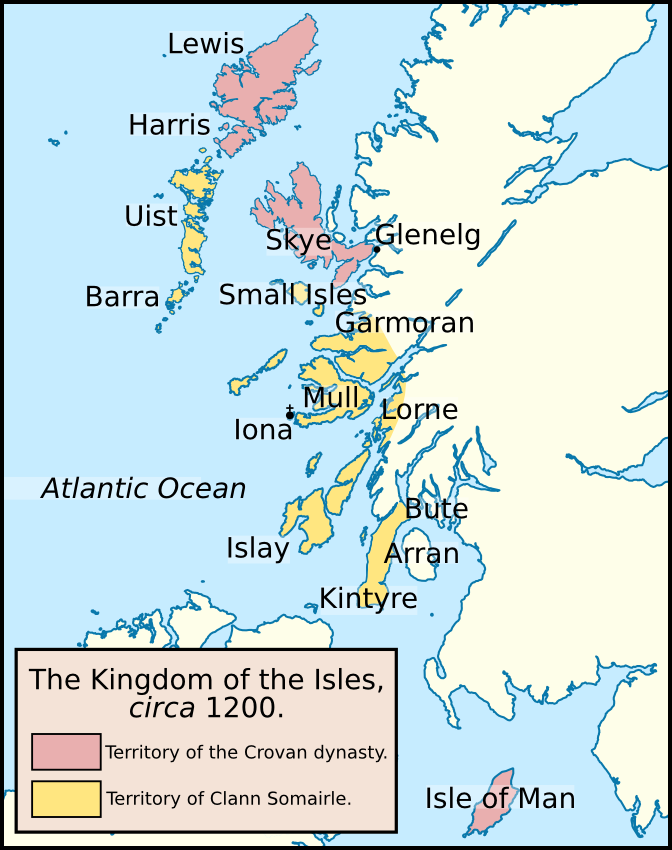
Map of the Kingdom of the Isles circa 1200. The lands of the Crovan dynasty bordering those of Clann Somhairle.

Magnús was a member of the Crovan dynasty—a line of Norse-Gaelic sea-kings whose kingdom encompassed the Isle of Man (Mann) and the northern parts of the Hebrides, from the late eleventh century to the mid thirteenth century. Although the kingdom originally encompassed the entirety of the Hebrides, much of the Inner Hebrides was permanently lost in the mid twelfth century, but the dynasty retained control of the largest Hebridean islands of Lewis and Harris and Skye. Magnús was the son of Óláfr Guðrøðarson, King of the Isles (died 1237). Although Óláfr is known to have had two wives, and no contemporaneous source names the mother of his children, Magnús' mother may have been Óláfr's second wife—Cairistíona, daughter of Fearchar, Earl of Ross, (died c. 1251). (Note: On Óláfr's death in 1237, he was succeeded by his son, Haraldr (died 1248). According to the Chronicle of Mann, Haraldr was only fourteen years old at the time of his father's death. This dates Haraldr's birth to about the time of the marriage of Óláfr and Cairistíona.)

Óláfr was a younger son of Guðrøðr Óláfsson, King of Dublin and the Isles (died 1187). Before his death in 1187, Guðrøðr instructed that Óláfr should succeed to the kingship. However, Guðrøðr was instead succeeded by his elder son, Rǫgnvaldr (died 1229), who had popular support. Rǫgnvaldr and Óláfr, who are thought to have had different mothers, subsequently warred over the dynasty's kingdom in the early thirteenth century, until Rǫgnvaldr was slain battling Óláfr in 1229. Rǫgnvaldr's son, Guðrøðr (died 1231), who was also in conflict with Óláfr, took up his father's claim to the throne, and at his height co-ruled the kingdom with Óláfr in 1231. Guðrøðr was slain in 1231, and Óláfr ruled the entire kingdom without internal opposition until his own death in 1237. Óláfr was succeeded by his son, Haraldr, who later travelled to Norway and married a daughter of Hákon Hákonarson, King of Norway (died 1263), but lost his life at sea on his return voyage in 1248. In May 1249, Haraldr's brother, Rǫgnvaldr (died 1249), formally succeeded to the kingship of the Crovan dynasty's kingdom.

Rǫgnvaldr Óláfsson's reign was an extremely short one; only weeks after his accession, he was slain on Mann. His killer is identified by a contemporary source as a knight named Ívarr who may have been an ally of Rǫgnvaldr Óláfsson's second cousin once removed, Haraldr Guðrøðarson (fl. 1249), who seized the kingship immediately following the killing. Although at first Haraldr was recognised as a legitimate ruler of the kingdom by Henry III, King of England (died 1272), Haraldr was later regarded as a usurper by his Norwegian overlord, Hákon. In 1250, Hákon summoned Haraldr to Norway to answer for his seizure of the kingship, and Haraldr was kept from returning to the Isles.

== Eóghan of Argyll and the invasion of Mann ==
Simplified pedigree illustrating Magnús' kinship to his wife, Máire Nic Dubhghaill, and his rival, Haraldr Guðrøðarson. Women are italicised.

Óláfr (died 1153)
Guðrøðr (died 1187)	Ragnhildr	Somhairle (died 1164)
Rǫgnvaldr (died 1229)	Ívarr	Óláfr (died 1237)	Dubhghall (died 1175×)
Guðrøðr (died 1231)	Haraldr (died 1248)	Rǫgnvaldr (died 1249)	Magnús (died 1265)	Donnchadh (died 1244×1248)
Haraldr (fl. 1249)	Guðrøðr (fl. 1275)	Eóghan (died c.1268×1275)
Máire (died 1302)

Eóghan Mac Dubhghaill, Lord of Argyll (died c.1268×1275) was a prominent member of Clann Somhairle, the descendants of Somhairle mac Giolla Brighde, King of the Isles (died 1164). Through Somhairle's wife, Ragnhildr, daughter of Óláfr Guðrøðarson, King of the Isles (died 1153), several leading members of Clann Somhairle claimed kingship in the Hebrides. In 1248, Eóghan and his second cousin, Dubhghall mac Ruaidhrí (died 1268), travelled to Hákon in Norway and requested the title of king in the Hebrides. Hákon subsequently bestowed the title upon Eóghan, and the following year, upon learning of Haraldr Óláfsson's death, Hákon sent Eóghan westward to take control of the Isles (at least temporarily) on his behalf. Up until this point Eóghan had two overlords: the King of Norway, who claimed the Hebrides; and the King of Scots, who claimed Argyll and coveted the Hebrides. Unfortunately for Eóghan, soon after his return from Norway, Alexander II of Scotland (died 1249) led an expedition deep into Argyll and demanded that Eóghan renounce his allegiance to Hákon. Eóghan refused to do so and was subsequently driven from his Scottish lordship.

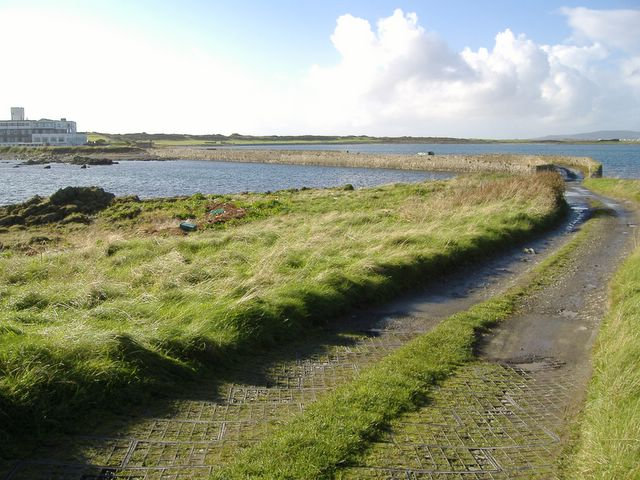
Map of Mann and the location of St. Michael's Isle and Castle Rushen. A photograph with a view looking south-west from St. Michael's Isle across the tidal causeway to mainland Mann.

In 1250, following Haraldr Guðrøðarson's summons to Norway, the Chronicle of Mann records that Magnús and Eóghan arrived on Mann with a force of Norwegians. The exact intentions of the invaders are unknown; it is possible that they may have intended to install Magnús as king. At the very least, Eóghan was likely looking for some form of compensation for his dispossession from his mainland Scottish lordship. The chronicle states that the invaders made landfall at Ronaldsway, and entered into negotiations with the Manx people; although, when it was learned that Eóghan styled himself "King of the Isles", the Manxmen took offence and broke off all dialogue.

The chronicle indicates that Eóghan had his men form-up on St Michael's Isle, an island that was attached to Mann by a tidal causeway. As evening drew near, the chronicle records that an accomplice of the knight Ívarr led a Manx assault on the island and routed the invading forces. The next day, the chronicle states that the invading forces left the shores of Mann. Ívarr's connection to the Manx attack on the invading forces of Eóghan and Magnús suggests that there was still considerable opposition on Mann by adherents of Haraldr to the prospect of Magnús' kingship there.

The following year, Henry III commanded the Justiciar of Ireland, John fitz Geoffrey (died 1258), to prohibit Magnús from raising military forces in Ireland for an invasion of Mann. A year later Magnús succeeded to the kingship, as the chronicle records that he returned to Mann and, with the consent of the people, began his reign. There are indications that opposition to Magnús, and thus possibly support of Haraldr, continued into the mid 1250s. For example, the chronicle records that when Hákon bestowed upon Magnús the title of king in 1254, it further notes that when Magnús' opponents heard of this, they became dismayed and that their hopes of overthrowing him gradually faded away. Furthermore, a letter of protection, written on behalf of Henry to Magnús in 1256, orders Henry's men not to receive Haraldr and Ívarr, which may thus indicate that these two men were still alive and active. Although Magnús' eldest brother, Haraldr Óláfsson, appears to have ruled over the entirety of the dynasty's thirteenth-century sea-realm, as did Magnús from 1252 onwards, the situation during the years between Haraldr Óláfsson's death and Magnús' accession is uncertain, and it is possible that the kingdom was partitioned between feuding dynasts, as it had been during the bitter inter-dynastic strife of the twelfth- and thirteenth centuries. (Note: For example, the permanent partitioning between brothers-in-law Somhairle and Guðrøðr Óláfsson in the mid twelfth century, when the dynasty lost control of the Inner Hebrides; the partitioning between half-brothers Rǫgnvaldr and Óláfr Guðrøðarson, in the late twelfth- and early thirteenth centuries; and the partitioning between the same Óláfr and his nephew, Guðrøðr Rögnvaldsson, in 1230.) Clearly the situation in the Isles was unsettled in the 1250s. For example, Henry is known to have written letters to Alexander, Hákon, and Llywelyn ap Gruffudd (died 1282), the co-ruler of Gwynedd, ordering them not allow their men invade Mann in Magnús' absence there in 1254.

== Scottish aggression ==
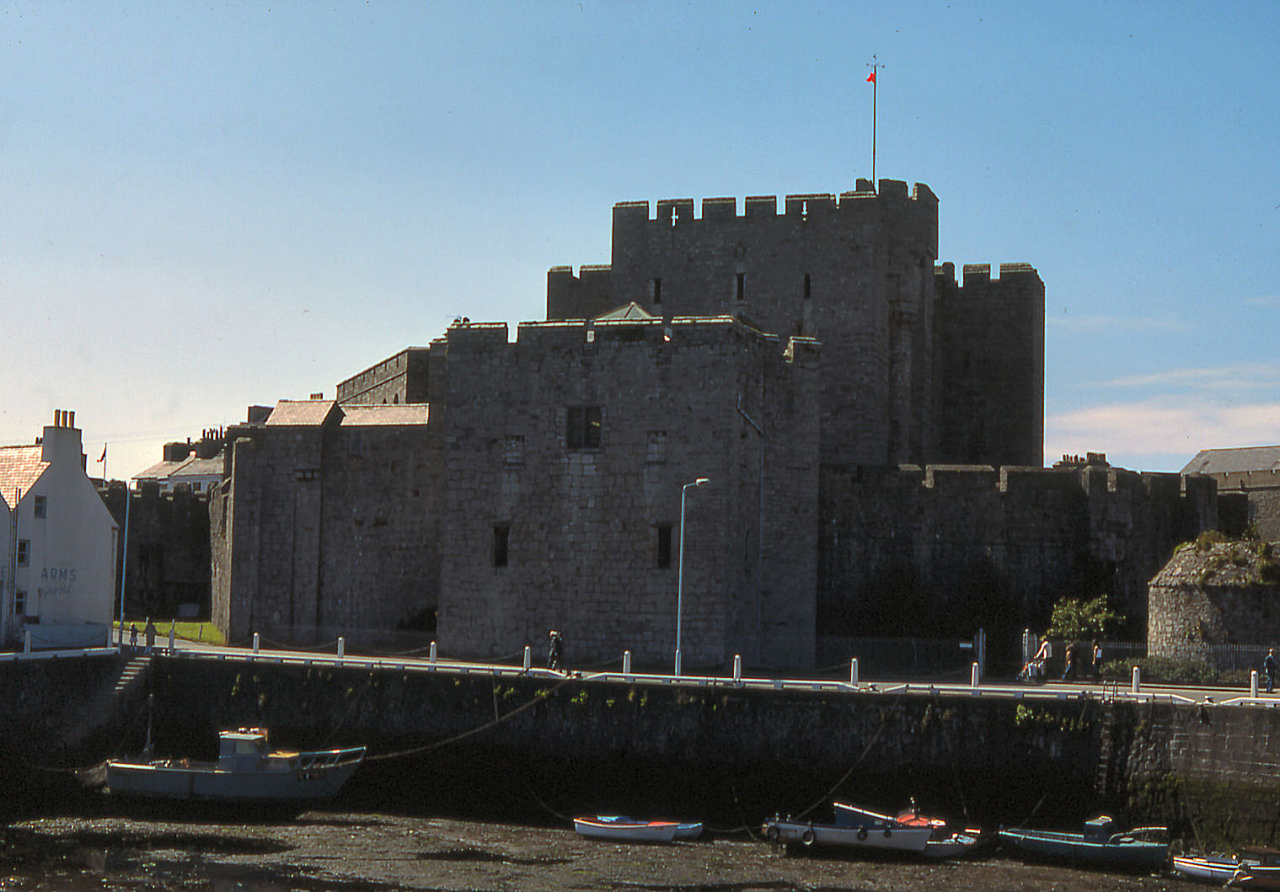
Castle Rushen, where Magnús died in 1265. By the mid thirteenth century the castle had become the power-centre on Mann. The castle dates to the late twelfth- or early thirteenth century.

In 1244, Alexander made the first of several attempts by Scottish monarchs to purchase the Hebrides from the Kingdom of Norway. It was following this unsuccessful bid that Hákon sent Eóghan into the Isles in 1249, which in turn led to Eóghan's expulsion from the Scottish-mainland when Alexander launched a full-scale summer invasion into Argyll. Alexander's sudden death in the Hebrides brought an abrupt end to his westward invasion, and it was not until the 1260s that a Scottish king again attempted to impose his authority into the Isles.

In 1261, Alexander III of Scotland (died 1286) sent an emissary to Norway to discuss the Isles. Negotiations proved fruitless, and the following year William I, Earl of Ross (died 1274) is recorded to have launched a vicious attack on Skye. (Note: For example, the Scots who took part in the attack are said to have "taken the little children, and laid them on their spear-points, and shook their spears until they brought the children down to their hands; and so threw them away dead".) The assault was likely carried out on behalf of Alexander, in response to the failure of Scottish mission to Norway the year previous. (Note: When the embassy attempted to leave Norway without permission, Hákon held the Scots against their will for a time.) In response, Hákon organised a massive military force to re-assert Norwegian control along the western seaboard of Scotland. At this time, the Norwegian king was at the height of his power, and his only son had just recently been recognised as heir to the throne.

== Norwegian retaliation ==
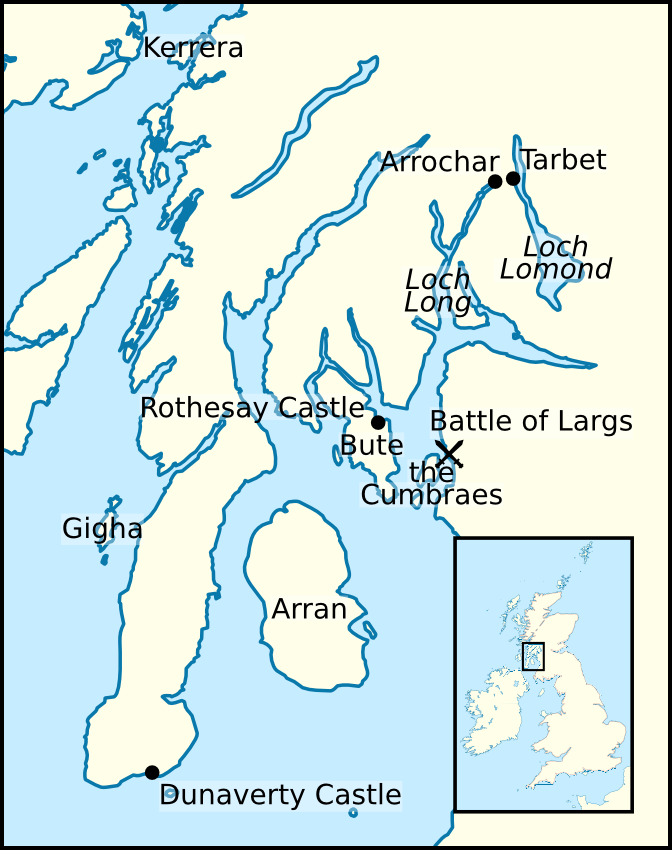
The Norwegian-led expedition along the south-western seaboard of Scotland.

Late in the summer of 1263, Hákon's fleet reached the northern seaboard of Scotland. Although the precise size of the fleet is unknown, the Icelandic Annals remark that "so great a host that an equally great army is not known ever to have gone from Norway". Upon reaching the Scottish-mainland, the late thirteenth century Hákonar saga Hákonarsonar ("The Saga of Hákon Hákonarson"), states that Hákon levied a tax upon Caithness and considered plundering into the Moray Firth. It is possible that he intended these acts as a form of retribution for the Earl of Ross' savage attack on Skye. The fleet then made its way south along the western seaboard to Skye, where the saga records that Hákon was met by Magnús. The saga states that Hákon's fleet then sailed south to Kerrera, where Dubhghall and Magnús amongst others, were sent to lead fifty ships towards Kintyre, while a smaller group was sent to Bute. The fleet sent to Kintyre was likely tasked with obtaining the allegiance of Aonghus Mór mac Domhnaill, Lord of Islay (died c.1293) and a certain Murchadh, both who are stated by the saga to have afterwards submitted to Hákon. (Note: The Mediaeval Gaelic personal name Murchad is rendered in Old Norse as Margaðr. Although several scholars have identified Murchadh as an otherwise unknown brother of Aonghus Mór, he is more likely to have been a member of Clann Suibhne—a recently dispossessed-kindred, descended from Murchadh's grandfather, Suibhne (died thirteenth century). In 1262, Skipness and parts of Knapdale, Kintyre, and Cowal, belonging to Dubhghall mac Suibhne (Murchadh's uncle), passed into the hands of Walter Stewart, Earl of Menteith (died c.1293) under uncertain circumstances. Members of Clann Suibhne sought to reacquire their ancestral lands as late as the first decade in the fourteenth century, before settling in Ireland for good.) The saga records that several castles were secured by Hákon's forces: Rothesay Castle on Bute; and an unnamed castle in southern Kintyre, which was more than likely Dunaverty Castle. At Gigha, the saga relates that Eóghan surrendered himself to Hákon, and informed the Norwegian king that he had decided to side with the Scots from whom he held a larger grant of lands. At about the time when Hákon let Eóghan go free, the saga records that the first messengers from the King of Scots arrived to parley.

The saga indicates that negotiations started peacefully enough, although as time drew on, and the weather grew worse, a time-pressed Hákon broke off all dialogue. He sent a detachment of ships deep into Lennox, through Loch Long—different versions of the saga number the force at forty and sixty ships—led by Magnús, Dubhghall, (Dubhghall's brother) Ailéan mac Ruaidhrí, Aonghus Mór, and Murchad. The saga states that the ships were dragged across land to Loch Lomond—which indicates that the invaders would have beached their ships and made portage across the isthmus between the two lochs (between what are today the settlements of Arrochar and Tarbet). (Note: Although the placename Tarbet is popularly stated to translate as "place of portage" on account of the saga's account, it actually means "isthmus".) The saga vividly describes how the invaders wasted the well-inhabited islands of the loch and the dwellings surrounding the loch. The fact that Hákon tasked his Norse-Gaelic magnates with leading this foray likely indicates that their boats were lighter than those of the Norwegians, and thus easier to portage from one loch to another; it could also indicate that the undertaking was meant to test their faithfulness to the Norwegian cause.

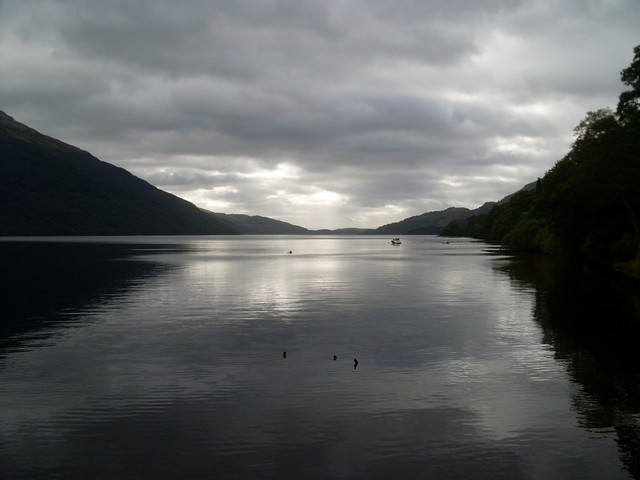
Looking south-east from Tarbet harbour, on the north-western shores of Loch Lomond. After dragging their vessels overland from Loch Long, Magnús and his Hebredian comrades launched their ships from what is today Tarbet, and plundered the islands and shores of Loch Lomond.

While Lennox was being plundered, Hákon and his main force, stationed between the Cumbraes and the Scottish mainland, were occupied with the events surrounding the Battle of Largs, between 30 September and 3 October. Although claimed by later Scottish chroniclers as a great victory, in reality the so-called battle was nothing more than "a series of disorderly skirmishes", with relatively few casualties that achieved little for either side. Following the encounter, Hákon led his fleet northward up through the Hebrides. At Mull, he parted with his Norse-Gaelic lords: Dubhghall was rewarded with Eóghan's former island-domain; Murchad was given Arran, and a certain Ruaidrí was given Bute, titles in name only since King Alexander quickly reasserted control. (Note: The saga states that Ruaidrí claimed Bute as his birthright, and that he slaughtered the garrison of the island's castle who had surrendered under truce, and afterwards viciously harried the surrounding district. Ruaidrí may have been a son of Óspakr Ǫgmundarson, King of the Isles (died 1230), a supposed member of Clann Somhairle, whom Hákon had recognised as king in the Isles. In 1230, Hákon supplied Óspakr with an invasion fleet which sailed down through the Hebrides to Bute. Although the force seized Rothesay Castle from the Scots, Óspakr died soon after from wounds suffered in the assault.) The Norwegian fleet left the Hebrides and reached Orkney by the end of October, where an ill Hákon died in mid December. Despite the saga's claim that Hákon had been triumphant, in reality the campaign was a failure. Alexander's kingdom had successfully defended itself from Norwegian might, and many of Hákon's Norse-Gaelic supporters had been reluctant to support his cause.

== Hebridean-Manx subjugation ==
Within months of Hákon's abortive campaign, embassies were sent forth from Norway to discuss terms of peace. Meanwhile, Alexander seized the initiative and made ready to punish the magnates who had supported Hákon. In 1264, Alexander assembled a fleet and made ready to invade Mann. Without any protection from his Norwegian overlord, or from Henry III (who was held captive at the time), (Note: Henry was captured following the disastrous Battle of Lewes, fought on 14 May 1264, during a period of open-rebellion in England. If Henry had not been captured, he may not have allowed Alexander to gain Magnús' submission.) Magnús had no choice but to submit to the demands of the powerful King of Scots. The two monarchs met at Dumfries, where Magnús resigned his crown, swore oaths to Alexander, rendered homage, and surrendered hostages. In return for Alexander's promise of protection against Norwegian retribution, Magnús was forced to provide Alexander's navy with several "pirate type galleys"—five of twenty oars and five of twelve oars. Alexander then ordered an invasion of the Western Isles, led by Uilleam, Earl of Mar (died ×1281), Alexander Comyn, Earl of Buchan (died 1289), and Alan Durward (died 1275). According to the thirteenth-century Gesta Annalia I, the Scots invaders plundered and killed throughout the islands; the expedition itself is corroborated by the late thirteenth century Magnúss saga lagabœtis ("The Saga of Magnús the Lawmender"), which indicates that Scottish forces went into the Hebrides and secured the submission of Aonghus Mór amongst others. Another expedition to reassert Scottish control, possibly led by the Earl of Ross, was launched into Caithness and Ross. The submission forced upon the island-magnates, particularly that of Magnús, marked the complete collapse of Norwegian influence in the Isles.

== Acta and honours ==
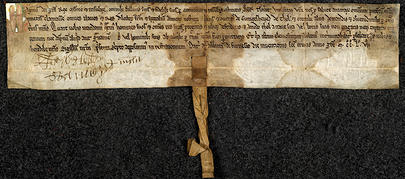
Magnús' surviving 1256 charter.

Only twenty originals, copies, or abstract versions of royal charters of the kings of the Crovan dynasty are known. Of these, only three date to the reign of Magnús—one of which, a grant to Conishead Priory in 1256, is the only original royal charter of the dynasty in existence. (Note: Magnús is known to have made several grants during his reign. One such transaction concerned his grant of commercial privileges to the monastery of Holm Cultram.) Important devices attached to royal charters were double-sided waxen seals, used to authenticate such instruments. Although no seals of the dynasty now survive, there exists several seventeenth- and eighteenth-century descriptions and depictions of ones believed to have belonged to Magnús' uncle Rǫgnvaldr, and brother Haraldr. This limited evidence suggests that, in the twelfth- and thirteenth centuries, the kings of the dynasty bore a sailing ship upon their seals, which would have likely represented the clinker-built galley utilised in the Isles at the time. Borne by men whose strength lay in the power of armed galley-fleets, such a symbol would have represented their authority in the Isles.

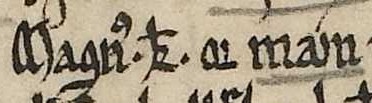
Magnús' name as it appears on folio 122r of AM 45 fol (Codex Frisianus): "Magnus konvngr or Man".

The Chronicle of Mann, the only narrative source for the dynasty's realm, was compiled on Mann during Magnús' reign. Analysis of the document reveals that the main scribe's last entry dates to 1257, in an account which records the dedication of the Abbey of St Mary of Rushen in the presence of Magnús and Richard, Bishop of the Isles. The chronicle thus appears to have been commissioned by, or on behalf of, Magnús himself. The chronicle is somewhat biased in favour of one line of the dynasty over another—the line of Magnús's father, Óláfr, over that of Óláfr's rival half-brother Rǫgnvaldr. For example, Haraldr Guðrøðarson is depicted as a usurper and tyrant, in contrast to the legitimate kingship of his cousin, Magnús. In fact, one reason for the chronicle's composition may have been to legitimise the line of Óláfr which, at the time of the chronicle's compilation, was then represented by Magnús himself.

Like his father and his brother Haraldr, Magnús is recorded within the Chronicle of Mann as having been knighted by Henry III. The knighthoods of Haraldr (in 1247) and Magnús (in 1256) appear to be confirmed by independent English sources. For example, within Henry's letter to Magnús in 1256, Magnús is described to have been invested with a military belt by the English king. Several of the leading members of the Crovan dynasty styled themselves in Latin rex insularum ("King of the Isles"). Magnús and his aforesaid brother, Haraldr, styled themselves in Latin rex manniae et insularum ("King of Mann and the Isles"). (Note: It is unknown how the royal descendants of Rǫgnvaldr Guðrøðarson styled themselves. Contradicting contemporary sources may indicate that Óláfr Guðrøðarson (died 1237) had a fourth son, named Guðrøðr.)

== Death ==
Thirteenth-century coffin-lid which may be that of either Magnús, his brother Rǫgnvaldr, or their father Óláfr.

Following his submission to Alexander, Magnús, the last reigning king of the Crovan dynasty, ruled peacefully until his death in 1265. According to the Chronicle of Mann, the king died at Castle Rushen on 24 November, and was buried at the Abbey of St Mary of Rushen. (Note: This record is the earliest mention of the castle in the chronicle.) There is a possibility that a coffin-lid found at Rushen, may be associated with the tomb of one of the three kings of the dynasty known to have been buried there. (Note: The three kings are Magnús, Magnús' brother Rǫgnvaldr, and their father, Óláfr.) At the time of his death, Magnús is known to have been married to Eóghan's daughter, Máire (died 1302). (Note: After becoming a widow, Máire had three successive husbands: Maol Íosa II, Earl of Strathearn (died 1271), Hugh, Lord of Abernethy (died 1291/1292), and William Fitzwarin (died 1299).) As the last of a long line of Norse-Gaelic rulers of Mann, his death ended the island's so-called "golden-age" of Scandinavian sea-kings. The continuation of Historia rerum Anglicarum records simply, that on his death, "kings ceased to reign on Mann".

== Dismantled kingdom ==
Three years after the inconclusive skirmish at Largs, terms of peace were finally agreed upon between the kingdoms of Norway and Scotland. On 2 July 1266, with the conclusion of the Treaty of Perth, the centuries-old territorial dispute over Scotland's western seaboard was at last settled. Within the treaty, Magnús Hákonarson, King of Norway (died 1280) ceded the Hebrides and Mann to Alexander, who in turn agreed to pay 4,000 merks sterling over four years, and in addition to pay 100 merks sterling in perpetuity. Other conditions stipulated that the inhabitants of the islands would be subject to laws of Scotland; that they were not to be punished for their actions previous to the treaty; and that they were free to remain or leave their possessions peacefully. In 1266, the Chronicle of Lanercost records that Alexander ruled Mann through appointed bailiffs; Scottish exchequer accounts record that the Sheriff of Dumfries was given allowance for maintaining seven Manx hostages.

In 1275, Magnús Óláfsson's illegitimate son, Guðrøðr, led a revolt on Mann and attempted to establish himself as king. According to the Chronicle of Mann and the Chronicle of Lanercost, a Scottish fleet landed on Mann on 7 October, and early the next morning the revolt was crushed as the Scots routed the rebels at the Battle of Ronaldsway. (Note: The accounts of the revolt's suppression in both chronicles are thought to be derived from the same original source. One of the Scots magnates present at the battle was Alasdair Mac Dubhghaill, Lord of Argyll (died 1310), son of Magnús' father-in-law.) Guðrøðr may very well have been slain in the defeat, although one source, the continuation of Historia rerum Anglicarum, states that he, his wife and his followers escaped the carnage to Wales. (Note: The annals date to about 1290, when they were copied from contemporary notes.)

By the end of the thirteenth century, the islands once ruled by Magnús and his fellow members of the Crovan dynasty before him, were incorporated into the Scottish realm. In 1293, the parliament of John, King of Scots (died 1314) established three new sheriffdoms within his kingdom. One of these three, the Sheriffdom of Skye, was granted to William I, Earl of Ross (died 1323). This sheriffdom included the seaboard north of Ardnamurchan (Wester Ross and Kintail), and the islands of Skye, Lewis, Uist, Barra, Eigg, and Rum. It is possible that parts of the sheriffdom may have been taken over earlier, sometime after the dismantling of the Kingdom of Mann and the Isles.

== Ancestry ==
Ancestors of Magnús Óláfsson

16. Guðrøðr Crovan, King of Dublin and the Isles (died 1095)
8. Óláfr Guðrøðarson, King of the Isles (died 1153)
4. Guðrøðr Óláfsson, King of Dublin and the Isles (died 1187)
18. Fearghus, Lord of Galloway (died 1161)
9. Affraic inghean Fearghusa
19. unknown
2. Óláfr Guðrøðarson, King of the Isles (died 1237)
20. Muirchertach Mac Lochlainn, High King of Ireland (died 1166)
10. Niall Mac Lochlainn, King of Cineál Eoghain (died 1176)
5. Fionnghuala Nic Lochlainn
1. Magnús Óláfsson, King of Mann and the Isles (died 1265)
6. Fearchar mac an tSagairt, Earl of Ross (died c.1251)
3. Cairistíona inghean Fearchair

== Citations ==
Magnús Óláfsson Crovan dynasty Died: 1265
Regnal titles
Preceded by Haraldr Guðrøðarson	King of Mann and the Isles; 1254–1265	Extinct
