= List of Manx royal consorts =

List of wives and consorts of the sovereign rulers of the Isle of Man

This is a list of wives and consorts of the sovereign rulers of the Isle of Man. Most of these women used other titles that their husband held rather than Queen or Lady of Mann.

== List of consorts ==
† Husband's death

# Husband's accession or appointment

Queens of the Isles
Picture	Name	Father	Birth	Marriage	Became Consort	Ceased to be Consort	Death	Spouse
	Margaret Fredkulla Ingesdotter of Sweden	Inge I of Sweden (Stenkil)	1080s	1101		August 1103†	4 November 1130	Magnus III of Norway
	Blathmin Ua Briain	Muirchertach Ua Briain, High King of Ireland (Ua Briain)	1094/97	after 1102	August 1103#	? Husband abandoned her after taking the throne	-	Sigurd I of Norway
	Aufrica of Galloway	Fergus, Lord of Galloway	-					Olaf I Godredsson
	Ingeborg Haakonsdottir	Haakon Paulsson, jarl of Orkney	-					Olaf I Godredsson
	Ragnhildis Ólafsdóttir	Olaf I Godredsson	-					Somerled
	Findguala of Ireland	Eóghan MacDubhghaill, Lord of Argyll	-	1176		10 November 1187†	-	Godred II Olafsson
	Christina of Ross	Fearchar mac in tSagairt, Earl of Ross	-	1220s		-	-	Olaf the Black
Queens of Mann and the Isles
	Cecilia Haakonsdottir	Haakon IV of Norway (Fairhair)	1225	1246/47		1248; Husband and wife drowned		Harald Olafsson
	Maria de Ergadia	Eóghan MacDubhghaill, Lord of Argyll	-	-	-	24 November 1265†	1302	Magnus Olafsson
Queens of Mann
Montagu family, 1333–1392
	Catherine Grandison	William de Grandison, 1st Baron Grandison	1304	around 1320 or 1329, or before	9 August 1333; Husband's recognition	30 January 1344†	23 November 1349	William Montagu, 1st Earl of Salisbury
	Joan Plantagenet	Edmund of Woodstock, 1st Earl of Kent (Plantagenet)	29 September 1328	before 10 February 1341	30 January 1344#	17 November 1349; Marriage annulled by Pope	7 August 1385	William Montacute, 2nd Earl of Salisbury
	Elizabeth de Mohun	John de Mohun, 9th Lord of Mohun of Dunster	1343	-		1392; Isle of Man sold	14/16 January 1415	William Montacute, 2nd Earl of Salisbury
Scrope family, 1392–1399: None
Percy family, 1399–1405: None
Stanley family, 1405–1504
	Isabel Lathom	Sir Thomas Lathom	-	1385	6 April 1406#	1414†	-	Sir John Stanley (died 1414)
	Isabel Harington	Sir Robert Harington	-					Sir John Stanley (died 1437)
	Joan Goushill	Sir Robert Goushill	-					Thomas Stanley, 1st Baron Stanley
	Eleanor Neville	Richard Neville, 5th Earl of Salisbury (Neville)	1447	after 10 May 1457	20 February 1459#	before November 1472		Thomas Stanley, 1st Earl of Derby
	Margaret Beaufort	John Beaufort, 1st Duke of Somerset (Beaufort)	31 May 1443	June 1472		29 July 1504†	29 June 1509	Thomas Stanley, 1st Earl of Derby
Ladies of Mann
Stanley family, 1504–1651
	Anne Hastings	Edward Hastings, 2nd Baron Hastings	1485	about 1507		23 May 1521†	17 November 1550	Thomas Stanley, 2nd Earl of Derby
	Dorothy Howard	Thomas Howard, 2nd Duke of Norfolk (Howard)	1497	21 February 1530		1545		Edward Stanley, 3rd Earl of Derby
	Margaret Clifford	Henry Clifford, 2nd Earl of Cumberland (Clifford)	1540	7 February 1554	24 October 1572#	25 September 1593†	28 September 1596	Henry Stanley, 4th Earl of Derby
	Alice Spencer	Sir John Spencer, High Sheriff of Northamptonshire (Spencer)	4 May 1559	about 1579	25 September 1593#	16 April 1594†	23 January 1637	Ferdinando Stanley, 5th Earl of Derby
Succession dispute (1594–1607)
Interim Lords (1607–1609)
	Elizabeth de Vere	Edward de Vere, 17th Earl of Oxford (Vere)	2 July 1575	26 June 1594	1609#	1612; Became Lady of Mann in her own right	10 March 1627	William Stanley, 6th Earl of Derby
	Charlotte de La Trémoille	Claude de La Trémoille, duc de Thouars (La Trémoille)	1599	26 June 1626	10 March 1627#	15 October 1651†	22 March 1668	James Stanley, 7th Earl of Derby
Fairfax family, 1651–1660
	Anne de Vere	Horace de Vere, 1st Baron Vere of Tilbury (Vere)	1618	20 June 1637	1651 ?	1660 ?	16 October 1665	Thomas Fairfax, 3rd Lord Fairfax of Cameron
Stanley family, 1660–1736
	Dorothea Helena Kirkhoven	Jehan, Lord of Heenvliet	1599	1650	1660; Husband's restoration	21 December 1672†	6 April 1673	Charles Stanley, 8th Earl of Derby
	Elizabeth Butler	Thomas Butler, 6th Earl of Ossory (Butler)	1660	10 July 1673		5 November 1702†	5 July 1717	William Stanley, 9th Earl of Derby
	Mary Morley	Sir William Morley	-	February 1705		1 February 1736†	29 March 1752	James Stanley, 10th Earl of Derby
Murray family, 1736–1765
	Jane Frederick	Thomas Frederick	1693	28 April 1726	1 February 1736#	13 June 1748		James Murray, 2nd Duke of Atholl
	Jean Drummond	John Drummond, 10th of Lennoch (Drummond)	-	7 May 1749		8 January 1764†	22 February 1795	James Murray, 2nd Duke of Atholl
House of Hanover, 1765–1901
	Charlotte of Mecklenburg-Strelitz	Duke Charles Louis Frederick of Mecklenburg (Mecklenburg)	19 May 1744	8 September 1761	10 May 1765; Isle of Man sold to British government	17 November 1818		George III of Great Britain
	Caroline of Brunswick	Charles II, Duke of Brunswick-Wolfenbüttel (Welf)	17 May 1768	8 April 1795	29 January 1820#	7 August 1821		George IV of the United Kingdom
	Adelaide of Saxe-Meiningen	George I, Duke of Saxe-Meiningen (Wettin)	13 August 1792	13 July 1818	26 June 1830#	20 June 1837†	2 December 1849	William IV of the United Kingdom
	Albert of Saxe-Coburg as Consort of Mann	Ernest I, Duke of Saxe-Coburg and Gotha (Wettin)	26 August 1819	10 February 1840		14 December 1861		Victoria of the United Kingdom
House of Saxe-Coburg and Gotha; renamed House of Windsor, 1901–present
	Alexandra of Denmark	Christian IX of Denmark (Schleswig-Holstein-Sonderburg-Glücksburg)	1 December 1844	10 March 1863	22 January 1901#	6 May 1910†	20 November 1925	King Edward VII
	Mary of Teck	Francis, Duke of Teck (Teck)	26 May 1867	6 July 1893	6 May 1910#	20 January 1936†	24 March 1953	King George V
Unmarried while king (20 January – 11 December 1936)								King Edward VIII
	Elizabeth Bowes-Lyon	Claude Bowes-Lyon, 14th Earl of Strathmore and Kinghorne (Bowes-Lyon)	4 August 1900	26 April 1923	11 December 1936#	6 February 1952†	30 March 2002	King George VI
	Philip Mountbatten as Consort of Mann	Prince Andrew of Greece and Denmark	10 June 1921	20 November 1947	6 February 1952; Wife's accession	9 April 2021		Queen Elizabeth II
	Camilla Shand	Major Bruce Shand	17 July 1947	9 April 2005	8 September 2022#			Charles III

== See also ==
- List of Norwegian consorts
- List of Irish consorts
- List of Scottish consorts
- List of English consorts
- List of British consorts
- History of the Isle of Man
