= John de Vesci =

13th-century knight

- Coat of arms of John de Vesci
- Buried: Alnwick Abbey
- Noble family: de Vesci
- Spouses: Agnes de Saluzzo; Isabella de Beaumont
- Father: William de Vesci
- Mother: Agnes de Ferrers

John de Vesci,(d.1289) sometimes spelt Vescy, was a prominent 13th-century noble. He was the eldest son of William de Vesci and Agnes de Ferrers. He married firstly Agnes de Saluzzo and secondly Isabella de Beaumont.

== Life ==
John was the son of eldest son of William de Vesci and Agnes de Ferrers. He succeeded to his father's titles and estates upon his father's death in Gascony, France in 1253. These included the barony of Alnwick in Northumberland, England, a large property in Northumberland, and considerable estates in Yorkshire, including Malton. Due to his being under age, his father had conferred the wardship of John's estates on Peter II, Count of Savoy, a foreign kinsman of Eleanor of Provence, Henry III of England’s wife. Peter would control the barony for ten years.

John sided with Simon de Montfort, 6th Earl of Leicester during the barons' rebellion against King Henry III, known as the Second Barons' War of 1263–64. He was summoned to the great parliament of January 1265, the first directly elected parliament in medieval Europe. During the battle of Evesham on 4 August 1265 he was wounded and taken prisoner. Released sometime afterwards he admitted to compound for his estates after the Dictum of Kenilworth.

During 1267, he participated with some of the northern barons in another rising, however Prince Edward went north with an army and John was forced to submit. After being treated well by Edward, he became a devoted friend. John went with Edward on his crusade to Palestine between 1271 and 1272. He was one of the two barons who, according to the legend, led Eleanor of Castile from the presence of her husband Edward, when he was operated upon for his poisoned wound.

In 1273 he was made governor of Scarborough Castle. In 1275, John was part of an expedition against Guðrøðr Magnússon, who was leading an uprising on Mann, in an attempt to establish himself as king. The Chronicle of Mann and Chronicle of Lanercost indicate that a Scottish fleet made landfall at Ronaldsway, on 7 October. The Chronicle of Lanercost records that John de Vesci and other Scottish magnates arrayed their forces on St Michael's Isle, and sent forth an embassy offering Guðrøðr and his followers peace. Guðrøðr refused, and the following morning, before sunrise, both chronicles indicate that Guðrøðr's forces were utterly defeated during the battle of Ronaldsway. According to the Chronicle of Mann, 537 rebels were slain by the Scots.

John married, through the influence of Peter, firstly Agnes de Saluzzo, daughter of Manfredo III, Marquis de Saluzzo and Beatrice de Savoy, before 1262. However, Agnes died very shortly afterwards. He married Isabella de Beaumont in 1280, and was granted by Edward (now King Edward I of England) lands in Northumberland and Kent, including Eltham.

He became the king's secretary and counsellor, and was sent in February 1282 with Antony Bek to Aragon to negotiate a marriage between Alfonso, son of King Peter III of Aragon, and Edward's daughter Eleanor, which resulted in the signing of the contract as proxy at Huesca. He served in Wales in 1282. In June 1285 he was sent with two others to negotiate the marriage between Edward's daughter Elizabeth and John, son of Floris V, Count of Holland.

John was given as a hostage by King Edward I to King Alfonso III of Aragon in 1288. He died in 1289, without issue, and was buried at Alnwick Abbey. His heart was buried in 1290 with the hearts of Queen Eleanor and her eldest son, Alfonso, in the Dominican priory at Blackfriars in London. His brother William succeeded to his estates and his widow Isabella played a notable part in the reign of King Edward II of England, as a strong friend of the king and queen, procuring the advancement of her brothers Henry de Beaumont, claimant to the earldom of Buchan, and Lewis de Beaumont, later Bishop of Durham despite allegations of illiteracy.

== Citations ==
Footnotes
