= Hango Hill =

Historic mound on the Isle of Man

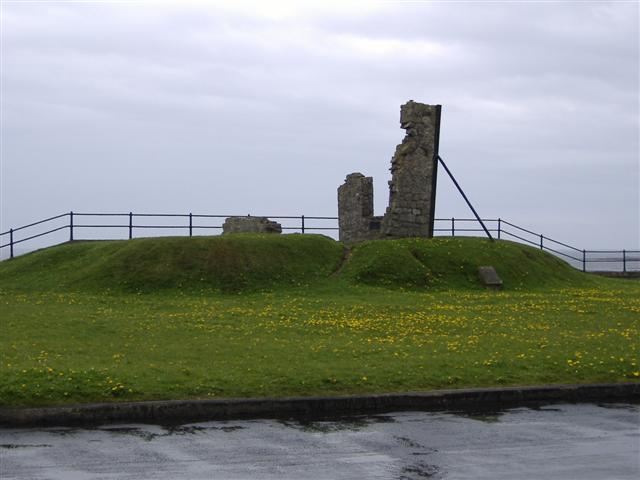
Ruins at Hango Hill

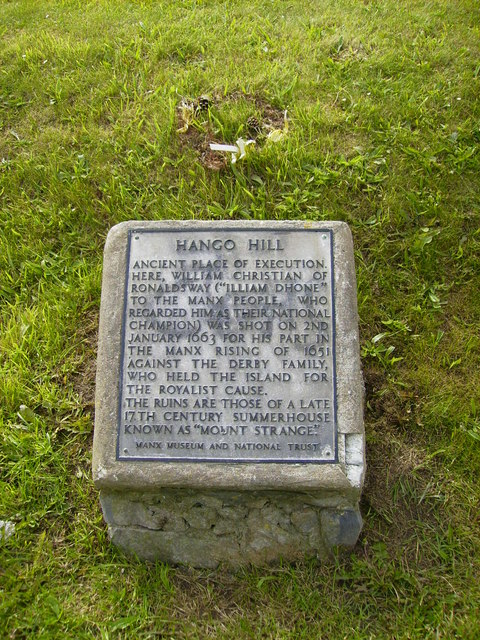
Commemorative plaque from Manx Museum.

Hango Hill is an historic mound on the coast road between Castletown and Derbyhaven, Malew parish, Isle of Man.

== Prehistory ==
The mound is said to be a possible prehistoric burial site. The recovery of a bronze flat axe implies a possible Bronze Age date. Its name derives from the Norse hanga-haugr, "Gallows hill".

== Place of execution ==
Hango Hill was used as a place of execution at least until the 17th century. An entry in the burials register of Malew for 1604 states that William Keruish and Robert Calow, from Kirk Maughold, for the murder of a certain Cottscam of that parish, were hanged at the Hango Hill gallows on 31 August and buried in the church of Kirk Malew, in front of the porch. It is most famous as the execution site of Illiam Dhone (William Christian) in January 1663, for his part in the Manx rising of 1651 against the Derby family and there is a broken-down monument with a plaque commemorating this. However the history is rather more complicated than that, as the island had been invaded by Parliamentary forces of the English Civil War.

== Building by the Earl of Derby ==
The monument is said to be the remains of a late 17th century summerhouse, or hall, known as Mount Strange, after a subsidiary title of the Earls of Derby.

A hall was built on the summit of Hango Hill by the earls of Derby in the years following the execution of William Christian in 1663. The hall was about 10m in length, but now only about a third survives following the erosion of the coastline. Early drawings show a building with battlements, and it has been referred to as a "blockhouse"; it seems however only ever to have served as a banqueting hall and a summerhouse, and it was associated with horseracing organised by the Earls along the dunes to the east onto Langness – the first "Derby" races.

The erection of this building would appear to imply that the site ceased to be used as a place of execution. Certainly by the 19th century, executions were being carried out at Castle Rushen nearby.

The estate of Hango Hill was placed in the hands of trustees by Bishop Barrow in 1668 for the purpose of founding an educational institution on the island; much later, the trust founded King William's College, which lies across the road from the mound itself.

== Modern era ==
A Committee of the Tynwald Court was appointed to consider what steps should be taken to preserve the ancient monuments at Hango Hill. It reported in November 1891.

A picture of Hango Hill was featured in a set of Manx Revenue stamps issued in 1966.

It is occasionally used as a gathering-place by Manx nationalists, with an annual speech in the Manx language.

The site is promoted as a film location.
