= Guðrøðr Magnússon =

13th-century Manx rebel

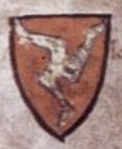
Coat of arms of the King of Mann, as depicted by the late thirteenth-century Armorial Wijnbergen. (Note: The coat of arms seems to have been first associated with Isle of Man after the Scots took possession of the island in the last half of the thirteenth century. The adoption of a new heraldic device—the triskeles—may have been used as a means of reinforcing the new regime on the island.)

Guðrøðr Magnússon (fl. 1275), also known as Godred Magnusson, was an illegitimate son of Magnús Óláfsson, King of Mann and the Isles. In 1275, whilst Mann was under Scottish overlordship, Guðrøðr led an unsuccessful revolt on the island. According to a near contemporary source, over five hundred people lost their lives in the subsequent Scottish invasion and suppression of the Manx. It is not certain whether Guðrøðr escaped the decisive defeat of the rebels at Battle of Ronaldsway with his life or if he was among the slain.

== Background ==
Guðrøðr was a son of Magnús Óláfsson, King of Mann and the Isles, a member of the Crovan dynasty. Guðrøðr's father came to power in 1252, following a period of confusion and contention in the Kingdom of Mann and the Isles, when Magnús' right to rule was acknowledged by Hákon Hákonarson, King of Norway, his nominal overlord. In the previous decade, Alexander II, King of Scotland had made several attempts to incorporate the Hebrides into the Scottish realm. In the 1260s, Alexander's son and successor, Alexander III, King of Scotland, renewed his kingdom's struggle to wrest the region from Norwegian overlordship. In so doing, Alexander III provoked a retaliatory military response from Hákon, a campaign that ultimately ended in failure with the latter's weakening health and death in 1263.

With Hákon's passing Alexander III seized the initiative, and oversaw a series of invasions into the Isles and northern Scotland. Recognising this dramatic shift in royal authority, Magnús Óláfsson submitted to Alexander III within the year, and in so doing, symbolised the complete collapse of Norwegian sovereignty in the Isles. The following year, Magnús died without a legitimate heir to succeed him, and proved to be the last ruling king of the Crovan dynasty. In 1266, Alexander III peacefully secured the Hebrides and Mann from Hákon's son and successor, Magnús Hákonarson, King of Norway, by way of the Treaty of Perth.

Following the conclusion of the treaty, Alexander III entrusted control of Mann into the hands of royal officials. Four such bailiffs or justiciars are known to have been appointed to govern the island: Godredus Mac Mares"; Alan, illegitimate son of Thomas fitz Roland, Earl of Atholl; "Mauricius Okarefair" / "Mauricio Acarsan"; and Reginald, the king's chaplain. (Note: The name borne by the first official could be evidence that this man was an Islesman or Gallovidian.) It is evident that Scottish rule was resented by the Manx, and Scottish exchequer records reveal that the Scottish Crown held several Manx hostages as a means to ensure order on the island.

== Rise and fall ==
In 1275, the continuation of the twelfth-century Historia rerum Anglicarum, the thirteenth- to fourteenth-century Chronicle of Mann, and the fourteenth-century Chronicle of Lanercost reveal that Guðrøðr led a revolt on the island against the Scottish Crown. According to the continuation of Historia rerum Anglicarum, Guðrøðr took possession of the island's strongholds, ejecting the Scottish representatives in the process. Alexander III quickly responded by sending a great fleet, drawn from the Hebrides and Galloway, to invade the island and restore Scottish royal authority. The commanders of this enterprise were: John de Vesci, John Comyn I, Lord of Badenoch, Alan, Alasdair Mac Dubhghaill, Lord of Argyll, and Ailéan mac Ruaidhrí. The identities of these men suggest that the Scottish force was composed of a small component of heavily armed knights, a contingent of infantry troops levied from the common army of Galloway, and a fleet of galleys gathered from the Hebrides. (Note: The expedition was evidently a personal affair for Alasdair, as his sister, Máire, was the widow of Guðrøðr's father.)

The Scots made landfall on the southern shores of Mann. According to the Chronicle of Lanercost, the invaders first attempted to resolve the uprising peaceably, demanding that the rebels stand down and submit to Alexander III. The account preserved by the continuation of Historia rerum Anglicarum suggests that lightly armed and poorly trained rebels were soundly crushed by well-armed Scottish warriors, with the Annals of Lanerost declaring that "the wretched Manxmen turned their backs, and perished miserably". Although the Chronicle of Mann specifies that 537 people were slaughtered by the Scots, there is reason to suspect that this tally may owe itself to contemporary poetic convention, as the source further quotes the following rhyming lament: "ten times fifty, three times ten and five and two did fall; O Manx race, beware lest future catastrophe you befall". It is unknown if the passage was composed directly for the chronicle or else already in circulation. In any case, the prophetic nature of the piece appears to be indicative of a Manx provenance.

It is uncertain if Guðrøðr died in the defeat or escaped with his life. The continuation of Historia rerum Anglicarum reports that he and his wife managed to escape the carnage on Mann, and fled to Wales. If correct, this source is one of several that demonstrate strong connections between the Crovan dynasty and Wales spanning the eleventh- and thirteenth centuries. In fact, it is possible that Guðrøðr initiated his rebellion having arrived from Wales.

== Aftermath ==
Upon the successful subjugation of the Manx, Alexander III installed his son, Alexander, as Lord of Mann. Although this eleven-year-old child was too young to govern in person, his elevation to the lordship reinforced Scottish control of the island in dramatic fashion. The bestowal of Mann as a royal appanage openly designated the prince as the heir to the Scottish throne, and enabled the authority of the Scottish Crown to be personally represented on the island. Evidence of trouble faced by the Scots on Mann occurs in 1288, when the Sheriff of Dumfries rendered an account for the expense of guarding the lands of a person slain on the island in the service of the Scottish Crown. As it turned out, Scottish control was not long-lasting, and before end of the century the Manx placed themselves under the overlordship of the English Crown.

Guðrøðr was not the last claimant to the island, as two women are known to have put forth claims of their own in the late thirteenth and early fourteenth centuries: a certain Aufrica de Connoght, and Maria, daughter of Rǫgnvaldr Óláfsson, King of Mann and the Isles.

== Ancestry ==
Ancestors of Guðrøðr Magnússon

16. Óláfr Guðrøðarson, King of the Isles (died 1153)
8. Guðrøðr Óláfsson, King of Dublin and the Isles (died 1187)
4. Óláfr Guðrøðarson, King of the Isles (d. 1237)
18. Fearghus, Lord of Galloway (died 1161)
9. Affraic inghean Fearghusa
2. Magnús Óláfsson, King of Mann and the Isles (died 1265)
1. Guðrøðr Magnússon (fl. 1275)
