= Maria de Ergadia =

Old Spanish name for Mary of Argyll

- Queen consort of Mann and the Isles; Countess of Strathearn
- Died: 1302
- Spouse: Magnús Óláfsson; Malise II, Earl of Strathearn; Hugh, Lord of Abernethy; William FitzWarin
- Issue: Alexander de Abernethy
- House: Clan MacDougall
- Father: Eóghan Mac Dubhghaill, Lord of Argyll

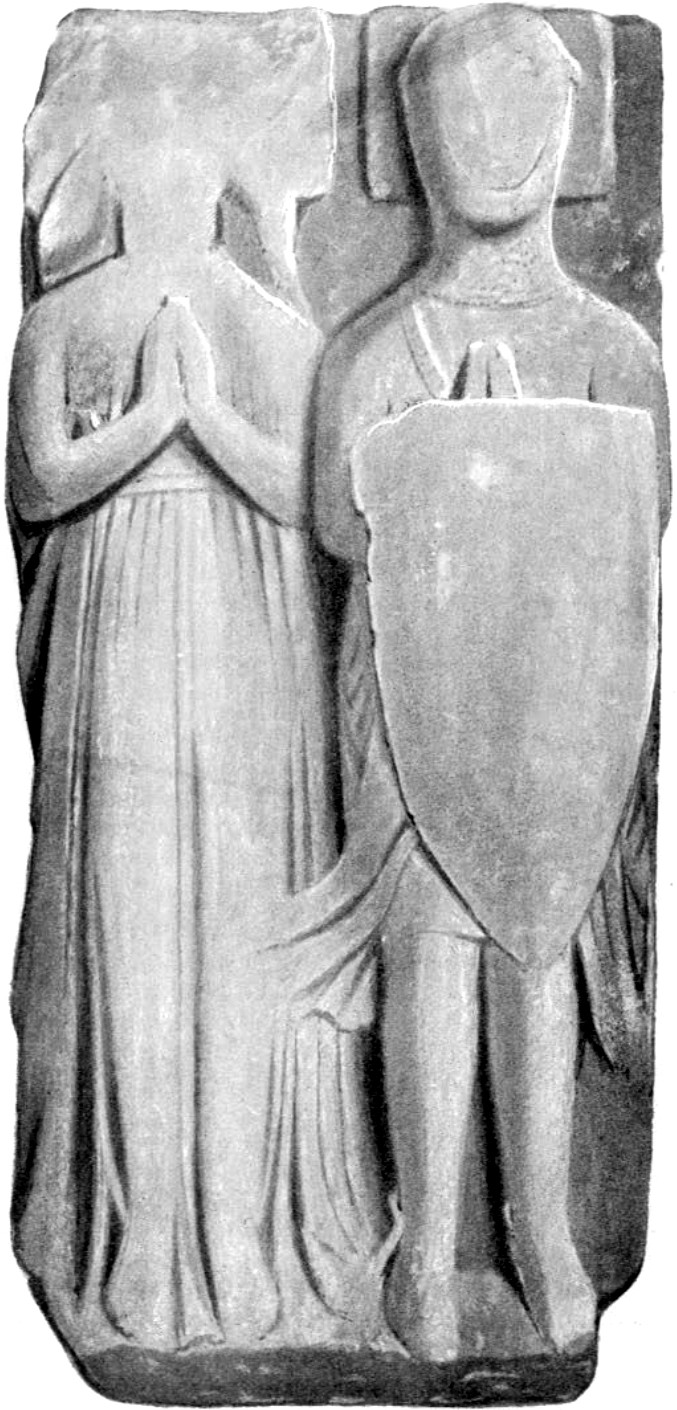
Effigy of Maol Íosa, Earl of Strathearn (right) and possibly Maria herself (left).

Maria de Ergadia (died 1302) was a fourteenth-century Scottish noblewoman. She was Queen consort of Mann and the Isles and Countess of Strathearn.

== Multiple marriages ==
Maria was a daughter of Eóghan Mac Dubhghaill, Lord of Argyll, and thus a member of Clann Dubhghaill.

She was married four times. Her successive husbands were: Magnús Óláfsson, King of Mann and the Isles, Maol Íosa II, Earl of Strathearn, Hugh, Lord of Abernethy, and William FitzWarin. These unions appear to reveal the remarkable wide-ranging connections enjoyed by Clann Dubhghaill.

It is unknown when Maria married her first husband, although the union cannot date later than Magnús' death in 1265. Maria's father last appears on record in 1268, when he witnessed a charter of Maol Íosa. It is possible that this could have been about the time when Maria married him. Within the same year, Maol Íosa is recorded to have owed a debt of £62 to the Scottish Crown, a sum that could have been incurred as a result of the marriage. The Earls of Strathearn were not amongst the Scottish realm's most wealthy magnates, and it is likely that Maol Íosa's marriage to the widow of the King of Mann and the Isles contributed to his wealth and enhanced his prestige. Throughout much of her life, Maria bore the title Countess of Strathearn.

Maria and her third husband, Hugh, had several children. One such child of her and Hugh was Alexander. After Hugh's death, Maria was summoned to appear before parliament to answer regarding Alexander's rights to various lands. In 1292, Maria was indebted to Nicholas de Meynell for 200 marks, part of the tocher of a daughter of hers. When Maria rendered homage to Edward I, King of England in 1296, she styled herself "la Reẏne de Man". The date of Maria's fourth marriage is unknown, although her fourth husband is known to have died in 1299. Within the year, Maria received her portion of William's poessesions and her dower from Alan, a son of William from an earlier marriage. Part of her dower included the wardship and marriage of John, son of Alan Logan. In 1300, John de Lyndeby, Prior of Holmcultram was appointed as her attorney to receive the portion of her dower in Ireland. In 1302, Maria died in London amongst her Clann Dubhghaill kin, and was buried along with William in London's Greyfriars church. An effigy of her second husband, and perhaps Maria herself, lies in Dunblane Cathedral.
