= St Michael's Isle =

Island of the Isle of Man

Coordinates: 54°04′26″N 4°36′27″W

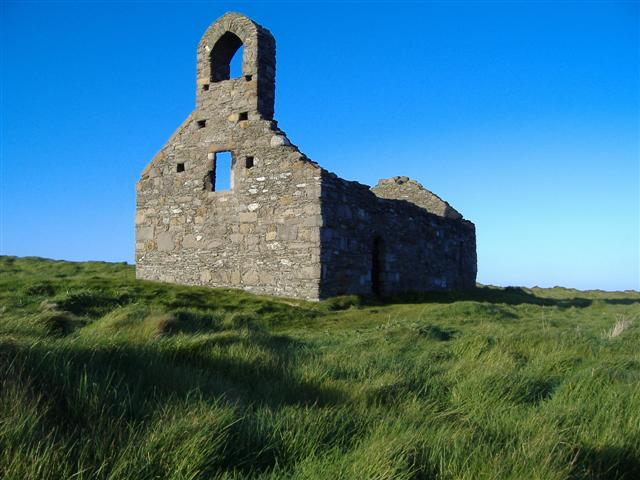
St Michael's Chapel

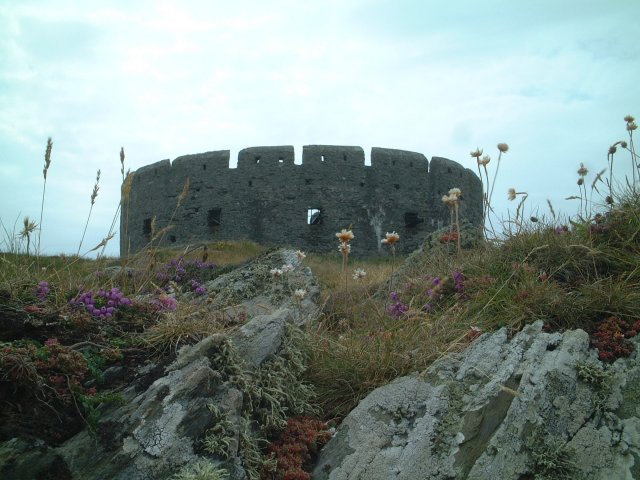
Derby Fort

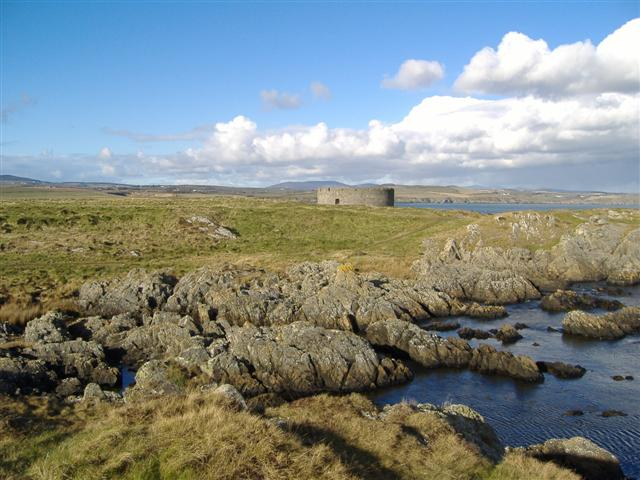
St Michael's Isle

St Michael's Isle (Manx: Ellan Noo Mael or Ynnys Vaayl), more commonly referred to as Fort Island, is an island in Malew parish in the Isle of Man, noted for its attractive ruins. It covers an area of 5.14 hectares (12.70 acres), is about 400 metres (440 yards) long from west to east, and is connected to the Langness Peninsula, near Derbyhaven, by a narrow causeway. The island itself is made of rocky slate and the soil is very acidic. Nevertheless, it has important communities of maritime plants.

== History ==
There is evidence for human activity on the island from the Mesolithic period onwards and there are two ancient buildings on the island. Both are in a state of ruin and closed to the public, though there are a number of walks which allow visitors to explore the surroundings.

The island commands the entrance to what was the vital strategic port of Derbyhaven. This necessitated the construction of a fort in order to safeguard the entrance to the bay; this gave rise to the name of Fort Island. Work was initially carried out by Edward Stanley, 3rd Earl of Derby on the order of King Henry VIII; it was upgraded in 1645 on the instructions of the 7th Earl.

The original name of St Michael's Isle is recorded as early as 1250 when John McDougal, Lord of the Isles, whom the King of Norway had appointed regent of Man while succession to the throne was being decided, landed at Ronaldsway with his son-in-law, the future King Magnus. The reception to the landing was hostile and resulted in McDougal leading his men onto St Michael's Isle where he marshalled his men into troops as they prepared to engage in battle. The Manx in turn also drew up for battle facing their adversaries, whom they were unable to reach because the high tide had cut St Michael's Isle off from them, and so the prospect of battle dissipated.

In 1275 after Alexander III, King of Scotland, had obtained possession of the Isle of Man, rebellion broke out on behalf of Godred, son of King Magnus, whom Alexander had defeated in battle and who had subsequently ceded the Isle of Man. John de Vesci, a Galloway nobleman, and other officers of the Scottish King landed on St Michael's Isle and again peace was offered and refused. The following morning, prior to sunrise, battle was joined and the Manx were defeated.

Kirk Michael (not to be confused with the Manx village of the same name) is mentioned in a description of the boundaries of Rushen Abbey, which appears to have been compiled in or around the year 1376. "Kirk" is a Scottish and former Northern English word meaning "church", and in this context, is a reference to Michael's Church, now known as St Michael's Chapel in modern English. St Michael's Chapel, a 12th-century chapel, is on the south side of the island. This Celtic-Norse chapel was built on the site of an older Celtic keeill.

The island is the site of two great battles for the control of the Isle of Man in 1250 and 1275, when England, Scotland and the Manx were fighting for control of the island. The Manx won the first battle, but as described above, 25 years later they lost control to Scotland.

== Derby Fort ==
Derby Fort, a 17th-century fort, is at the eastern end of the island. It was built by James Stanley, the 7th Earl of Derby and Lord of Mann in 1645, during the English Civil War, to protect the then busy port of Derbyhaven.

The island is a bird sanctuary.
