= Receiver-general of the Isle of Man =

The receiver-general of the Isle of Man was an appointment made by the lieutenant governor. Until 1919, the receiver-general had a seat in the Legislative Council but he was removed as an ex officio member of the council under the Isle of Man Constitution Amendment Act 1919.

The holder of this office was called "Receiver-General and Collector" between 1765 and 1832, and since then receiver-general only. After 1765, he had no land revenues to collect. He shared the work of collecting the customs duties and port dues with the Water-Bailiff until 1832, when he was superseded by the appointment of a Collector, who was taken from among the members of HM Customs service.

In 1791, the receiver-general was deprived of his seat in the Legislative Council on the grounds that he was not appointed by patent under any of the royal seals, but he was then, on the representation of the commissioners, restored to it. He did not, however, take advantage of this privilege till 1813.

Between 1832 and 1872, he did not sit in the Legislative Council, though there seems to have been nothing to prevent his doing so. In 1872, when the appointment of the Harbour Board was vested in the governor, subject to the approval of Tynwald, he resumed his seat.

R. C. Cain served for many years as an elected member of the council, and was described in Hansard as receiver-general until late in 1948. He continued to serve without such description until 1951.

== Receivers-general ==
- Robert Caesar Cain, from 1934
- Joseph Qualtrough, 1919–1934 (father of Joseph Davidson Qualtrough)
- John Thomas Cowell, 1909–1919
- Colonel William Anderson, 1896–1909
- The Rev. William Bell Christian, 1883–1886
