= Derbyhaven =

Human settlement on the Isle of Man

Coordinates: 54.0784°N 4.6265°W

Derbyhaven: Manx: Camys y Ree
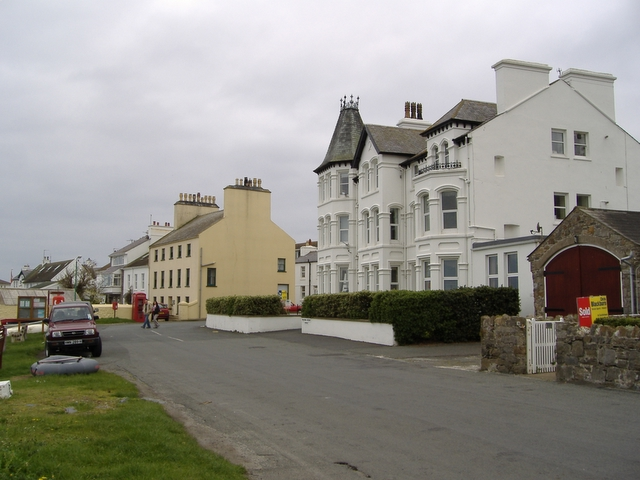
- View of Derbyhaven Hotel, now apartments

- Location within the Isle of Man
- Population: (2006 Census)
- OS grid reference: SC282679
- Parish: Malew
- Sheading: Rushen
- Crown dependency: Isle of Man
- Post town: ISLE OF MAN
- Postcode district: IM9
- Dialling code: 01624
- Police: Isle of Man
- Fire: Isle of Man
- Ambulance: Isle of Man

Derbyhaven (Manx: Camys y Ree) ("King's Harbour" or "King's Cove") is a hamlet near Castletown in the southern parish of Malew, Isle of Man. It is located on the isthmus connecting Langness Peninsula to the rest of the island, on the bay of the same name, and also on Castletown Bay on the other side of the isthmus.

In the 17th century it was a significant port. The then Lord of Mann, James, 7th Earl of Derby, had the fort on nearby St Michael's Isle (Fort Island) rebuilt in 1645 (Henry VIII built the original fort in 1540) to protect Derbyhaven from the parliamentarians in the English Civil War. Later, in the 18th century, the fort served as a lighthouse.

Derbyhaven has a plaque commemorating the Battle of Ronaldsway, in which a Manx revolt led by Guðrøðr Magnússon was utterly crushed by Scottish forces in 1275.

Castletown Golf Links is a championship golf course at Derbyhaven on the Langness Peninsula which provides views of the Irish Sea. The Links was founded in originally laid out by Old Tom Morris in 1891, with improvements over the past 125 years.
