= Ronaldsway =

Village in the Isle of Man

Coordinates: 54.08667°N 4.634262°W

Ronaldsway: Manx: Roonysvaie
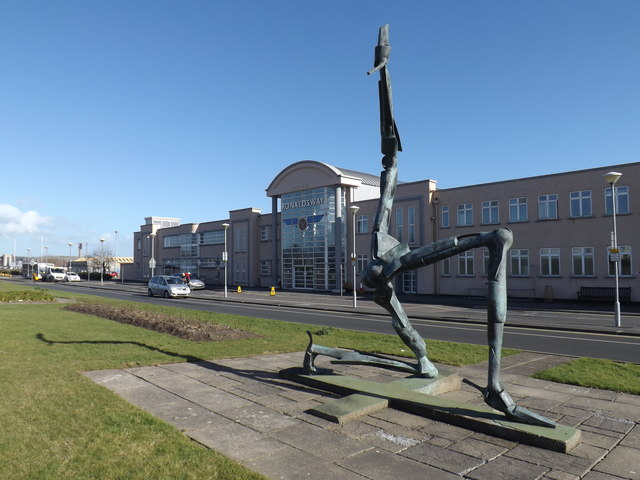
- Ronaldsway Airport Terminal Building

- Location within the Isle of Man
- OS grid reference: SC280699
- Parish: Malew
- Sheading: Rushen
- Crown dependency: Isle of Man
- Post town: ISLE OF MAN
- Postcode district: IM9
- Dialling code: 01624
- Police: Isle of Man
- Fire: Isle of Man
- Ambulance: Isle of Man
- House of Keys: Malew and Santon

Ronaldsway (Manx: Roonysvaie) is a settlement in the parish of Malew in the south of the Isle of Man, between the village of Ballasalla and the town of Castletown.

== Features ==
It is notable as the location of Isle of Man Airport and historically of RNAS Ronaldsway, together with the adjoining customs free zone and industrial estate.

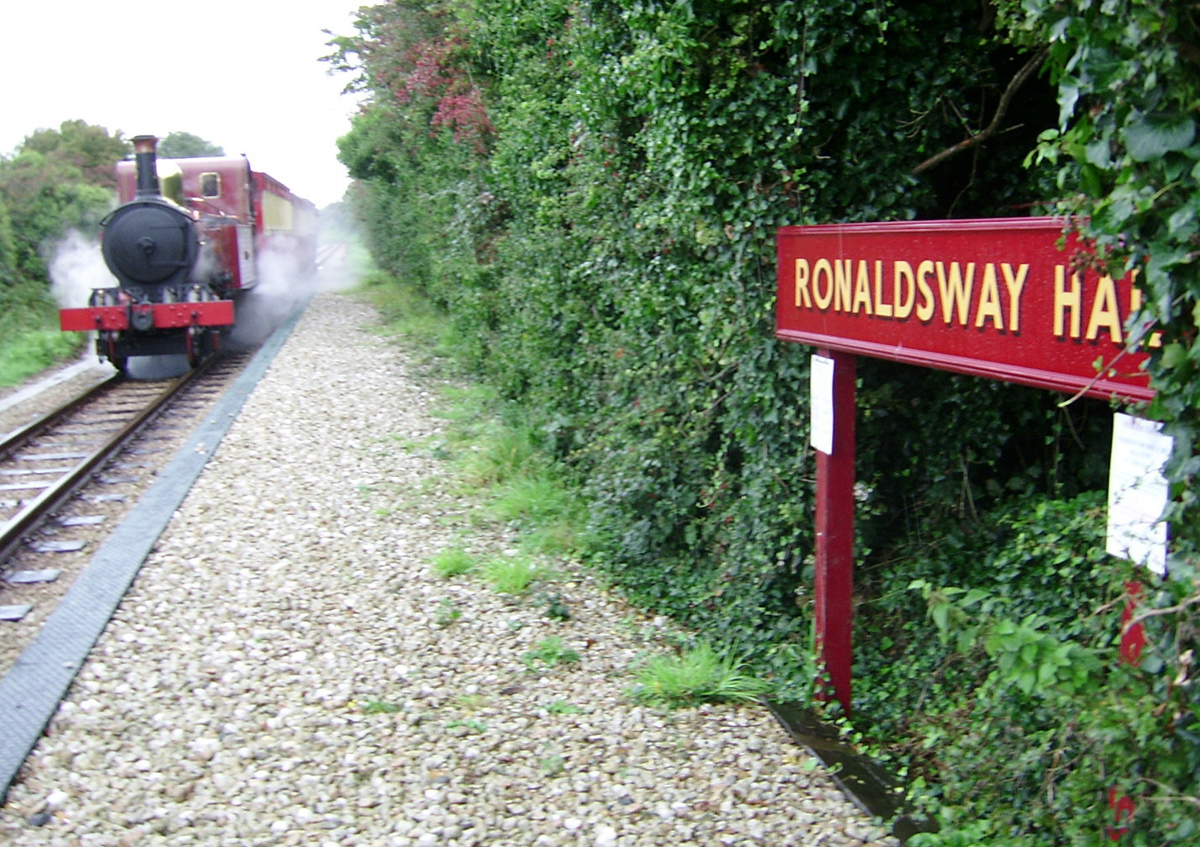
IMR steam train from Douglas arriving at Ronaldsway Halt in 2006

The place name is derived from the Old Norse personal name Rǫgnvaldr and the Old Norse element vað meaning "ford", or alternatively vágr meaning "large, narrow bay" as in Stornoway. It is possible that the eponym of Ronaldsway is Rǫgnvaldr Guðrøðarson, King of the Isles (died 1229). The site was once a landing place for Castle Rushen and Castletown. Ronaldsway first appears on record in the Chronicle of Mann, which documents an instance when Rǫgnvaldr's half-brother, Óláfr (died 1237), landed on the island in 1224, and confronted him for a share of the kingdom.

Ronaldsway is the site of the Battle of Ronaldsway, fought in October 1275, in which a Manx revolt led by Guðrøðr Magnússon (fl. 1275) was crushed by Scottish royal forces.

Ronaldsway is one of the 22 coastal weather stations whose conditions are reported in the BBC Shipping Forecast.

There is a request stop on the Isle of Man railway located just west of the Ronaldsway Industrial Estate on the Silverburn river.

BA Connect (BA CitiExpress) had an engineering base in Ronaldsway, employing 110 people. After Flybe acquired BA Connect, Flybe announced that it would discontinue the base.

== Archaeology ==
While the airfield runway at Ronaldsway Airport was being extended during the Second World War, a sunken-floored structure was uncovered dating from the third millennium BC in the late Neolithic era. The distinctive nature of the finds, including pots and stone tools, gave rise to the name Ronaldsway culture, and similar artefacts have been found elsewhere.

== Climate ==
Ronaldsway has an oceanic climate (Cfb) with short, mild summers and long, cool winters. Ronaldsway has very cloudy and rainy winters.

Climate data for Ronaldsway (1991–2020 normals)
Month	Jan	Feb	Mar	Apr	May	Jun	Jul	Aug	Sep	Oct	Nov	Dec	Year
Record high °C (°F)	13.3 (55.9)	13.2 (55.8)	17.1 (62.8)	20.0 (68.0)	24.0 (75.2)	27.5 (81.5)	28.9 (84.0)	27.8 (82.0)	26.5 (79.7)	22.7 (72.9)	16.3 (61.3)	15.0 (59.0)	28.9 (84.0)
Mean daily maximum °C (°F)	8.5 (47.3)	8.4 (47.1)	9.4 (48.9)	11.5 (52.7)	14.3 (57.7)	16.5 (61.7)	18.2 (64.8)	18.2 (64.8)	16.6 (61.9)	13.8 (56.8)	11.1 (52.0)	9.2 (48.6)	13.0 (55.4)
Daily mean °C (°F)	6.4 (43.5)	6.2 (43.2)	7.0 (44.6)	8.7 (47.7)	11.2 (52.2)	13.6 (56.5)	15.4 (59.7)	15.5 (59.9)	14.0 (57.2)	11.5 (52.7)	8.9 (48.0)	7.1 (44.8)	10.4 (50.7)
Mean daily minimum °C (°F)	4.3 (39.7)	3.9 (39.0)	4.5 (40.1)	5.8 (42.4)	8.1 (46.6)	10.6 (51.1)	12.5 (54.5)	12.7 (54.9)	11.4 (52.5)	9.2 (48.6)	6.7 (44.1)	4.9 (40.8)	7.9 (46.2)
Record low °C (°F)	−7.8 (18.0)	−5.8 (21.6)	−6.0 (21.2)	−3.4 (25.9)	−0.8 (30.6)	1.4 (34.5)	5.3 (41.5)	4.9 (40.8)	1.0 (33.8)	−1.5 (29.3)	−4.0 (24.8)	−7.0 (19.4)	−7.8 (18.0)
Average precipitation mm (inches)	82.5 (3.25)	65.5 (2.58)	62.5 (2.46)	55.1 (2.17)	54.6 (2.15)	62.4 (2.46)	59.1 (2.33)	67.4 (2.65)	70.6 (2.78)	103.3 (4.07)	105.2 (4.14)	95.0 (3.74)	882.9 (34.76)
Average precipitation days (≥ 1.0 mm)	14.2	11.4	10.9	10.0	9.8	9.3	10.2	10.8	11.2	13.4	15.8	14.7	141.8
Mean monthly sunshine hours	54.6	82.8	127.3	181.9	235.3	213.4	203.5	190.2	145.9	105.4	63.9	47.0	1,651.2
Source 1: Met Office
Source 2: Météo Climat, Infoclimat
