= 1952 in the United Kingdom =

Events and occurrences from the year 1952 in the United Kingdom of Great Britain and Northern Ireland. This years' most significant event sees a change of monarch.

== Incumbents ==
- Monarch — George VI (until 6 February), Elizabeth II (starting 6 February)
- Prime Minister — Winston Churchill (Conservative)

== Events ==
- Undated – Geoffrey Dummer proposes the integrated circuit.

=== January to April ===
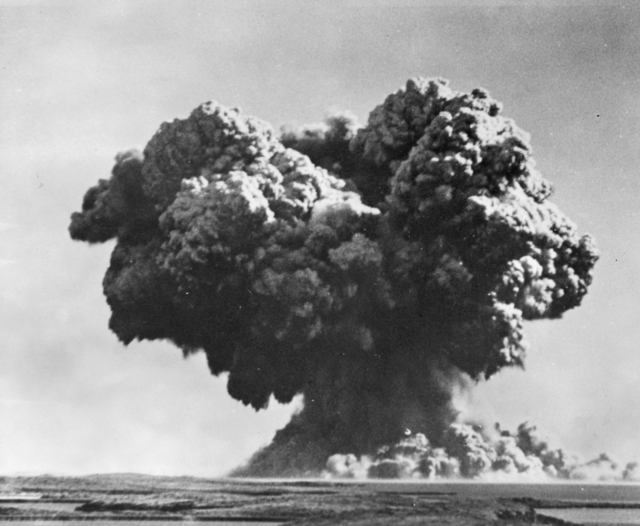
The UK's first nuclear bomb

- 5 January – Prime Minister Winston Churchill arrives in the United States for an official visit and talks with President Harry S. Truman.
- 10 January – An Aer Lingus Douglas DC-3 aircraft on a London–Dublin flight crashes in Wales due to vertical draft in the mountains of Snowdonia, killing twenty passengers and the three crew.
- 16 January – Sooty, Harry Corbett's glove puppet teddy bear, first appears on BBC Television. He would get his own series three years later.
- 30 January – British troops remain in Korea, where they have spent the last eighteen months, after a breakdown of talks aimed at ending the Korean War.
- 1 February – The first TV detector van is commissioned in the UK as the beginning of a clampdown on the estimated 150,000 British households that watch television illegally without a licence.
- 6 February – King George VI dies at Sandringham House, Norfolk, early that morning, aged 56. It is revealed that he had been suffering from lung cancer. He is immediately succeeded by his 25-year-old daughter, Princess Elizabeth, Duchess of Edinburgh, who ascends to the throne as Queen Elizabeth II. The new Queen is on a visit to Kenya at the time of her father's death, and returns to London the following day. She will eventually become the longest-lived and longest-reigning British monarch with a reign of 70 years.
- 8 February – Queen Elizabeth II is proclaimed Queen of the United Kingdom of Great Britain and Northern Ireland at St James's Palace.
- 14–25 February – Great Britain and Northern Ireland compete at the Winter Olympics in Oslo and win one gold medal.
- 15 February – The funeral of King George VI takes place at St George's Chapel, Windsor Castle. His body has been lying in state in Westminster Hall since 11 February.
- 21 February – Compulsory identity cards, issued during World War II, are abolished.
- 26 February – Prime Minister Winston Churchill announces that the United Kingdom has an atomic bomb.
- 31 March – Computer scientist Alan Turing is convicted of 'gross indecency' after admitting to a consensual homosexual relationship in Regina v. Turing and Murray. He consents to undergo oestrogen treatment to avoid imprisonment.
- 29 April – The University of Southampton is chartered, the first post-war university established.

=== May to August ===
- 2 May – The De Havilland Comet becomes the world's first jet airliner, with a maiden flight from London to Johannesburg.
- 3 May – Newcastle United F.C. win the FA Cup for a record fifth time. Last year's winners retain the trophy with a 1–0 win over Arsenal at Wembley Stadium. The only goal of the game is scored by Chilean-born forward George Robledo, the first foreigner to score in an FA Cup final.
- 21 May – Eastcastle Street robbery: a Post Office van is held up in the West End of London and £287,000 (worth £8,189,519 in 2019) stolen, Britain's largest post-war robbery up to this date; the thieves are never caught.
- June – Reindeer reintroduced to the Cairngorms of Scotland.
- 1 June – One shilling charge is introduced for prescription drugs dispensed under the National Health Service (NHS).
- 5 June – Elizabeth II attends Trooping the Colour for the first time as monarch. She rides a police horse named Winston to and from the ceremony.
- 5 July – The last of the original trams runs in London; people turn out in force to say farewell.
- 19 July–3 August – Great Britain and Northern Ireland compete at the Olympics in Helsinki and win one gold, two silver, and eight bronze medals.
- 19 July – Len Hutton is appointed as the England cricket team's first professional captain for 65 years.
- 24 July – Somali sailor Mahmood Mattan, 28, is convicted of the murder of pawnbroker Lily Volpert, and sentenced to death at Glamorgan Assizes; his conviction will be quashed 45 years later.
- 16 August – Lynmouth Flood: 34 people killed in a flood at Lynmouth in Devon. Many other people are injured and numerous buildings are damaged.

=== September to December ===
- 3 September – Mahmood Mattan becomes the last person to be hanged at Cardiff Prison.
- 6 September – Farnborough Airshow DH.110 crash: 31 people are killed when a supersonic jet aeroplane breaks up over the crowd at the Farnborough Airshow.
- 19 September – English film star Charlie Chaplin, sailing to the United Kingdom with his family for the premiere of his film Limelight (London, 16 October), is told that by instruction of J. Edgar Hoover he will be refused re-entry to the United States until he has been investigated by the U.S. Immigration Service. He chooses to remain in Europe.
- 29 September
  - The Manchester Guardian prints news, rather than advertisements, on its front page for the first time.
  - Racing driver John Cobb, 52, is killed in a speedboat accident on Loch Ness while attempting to set a world record.
- 3 October – Operation Hurricane: The UK detonates its first atomic bomb in the Monte Bello Islands, Australia.
- 5 October – Tea rationing ends, after thirteen years, as announced by the Government two days earlier.
- 8 October – Harrow and Wealdstone rail crash in North London claims the lives of 108 people.
- 9 October – Knowsley Hall shootings: Lady Derby and her cook are injured, and the butler and under-butler killed, when trainee footman Harold Winstanley fires a Schmeisser pistol at Knowsley Hall in Lancashire; Winstanley flees but is later arrested.
- 19 October
  - A small militant Welsh republican group, Y Gweriniaethwyr, make an unsuccessful attempt to blow up a water pipeline leading from the Claerwen dam in mid Wales to Birmingham. The Claerwen reservoir is officially opened on 23 October.
  - John Bamford, aged 15, rescues victims of a house fire, and becomes the youngest person to be awarded the George Cross.
- November – Royal College of General Practitioners (RCGP) established.
- 4 November – Queen Elizabeth II opens Parliament for the first time, wearing her tiara, as she hasn't been crowned yet.
- 14 November – The magazine New Musical Express (launched on 7 March) publishes the first UK Singles Chart.
- 25 November – Agatha Christie's play The Mousetrap starts its run at the New Ambassadors Theatre in London. It will still be running in London as of 2022, having transferred next door to St Martin's Theatre in 1974.
- 29 November – First General Post Office (GPO) pillar box of the reign of Queen Elizabeth II to be erected in Scotland, on the Inch housing estate in Edinburgh, is attacked in protest at its bearing the Royal Cipher of Elizabeth II, considered historically incorrect in Scotland.
- 4–9 December – Great Smog blankets London, causing transport chaos and, it is believed, around 4,000 deaths.
- 10 December – Archer Martin and Richard Synge win the Nobel Prize in Chemistry "for their invention of partition chromatography".
- 12 December – BBC children's television series Flower Pot Men debuts.
- 16 December – Harold Winstanley, the perpetrator of the Knowsley Hall shootings, is found guilty but insane at Manchester Assizes, and sentenced to detention at Broadmoor Hospital.
- 25 December – The Queen makes her first Christmas speech to the United Kingdom and the British Commonwealth.
- 30 December – A Royal Air Force (RAF) Avro Lancaster bomber crashes in Luqa, Malta, after an engine failure, killing three crew members and a civilian on the ground.
- December – 'Utility furniture' scheme ends.

== Publications ==
- H. E. Bates' novel Love for Lydia.
- John Bingham's thriller My Name is Michael Sibley.
- Henry Cecil's comic novel No Bail for the Judge.
- Agatha Christie's novels Mrs McGinty's Dead (Hercule Poirot) and They Do It with Mirrors (Miss Marple).
- Dorothy Edwards' children's stories My Naughty Little Sister.
- Richard Gordon's comic novel Doctor in the House.
- David Jones' epic poem The Anathemata: fragments of an attempted writing.
- C. S. Lewis' novel The Voyage of the Dawn Treader.
- Mary Norton's children's novel The Borrowers.
- Evelyn Waugh's novel Men at Arms, first of the Sword of Honour trilogy.

== Births ==
- 9 January – Hugh Bayley, English politician
- 10 January – George Turpin, English boxer
- 18 January – Michael Angelis, actor (died 2020)
- 29 January – Tim Healy, actor
- 4 February – Steve Smith, English political scientist and academic
- 12 February – Simon MacCorkindale, actor (died 2010)
- 14 February – Anton Lesser, actor
- 22 February – Bernard Silverman, English minister, statistician and academic
- 25 February – Joey Dunlop, Northern Irish motorcycle racer (died 2000)
- 28 February – Frank Warren, boxing promoter
- 4 March – David Richards, general, Chief of the Defence Staff
- 11 March
  - Douglas Adams, writer (died 2001)
  - James Fleet, actor
- 15 March – Howard Devoto, punk singer-songwriter
- 17 March – Barry Horne, animal rights activist (died 2001)
- 22 March – Des Browne, politician
- 26 March – David Amess, politician (died 2021)
- 28 March – Tony Brise, racing driver (died 1975)
- 11 April
  - Michael Thomas, actor (died 2019)
  - Peter Windsor, sports reporter
- 16 April
  - Bob Humphrys, broadcaster (died 2008)
  - Chaz Jankel, singer, lyricist, songwriter, and multi-instrumentalist (soloist, and Ian Fury and the Blockheads)
- 19 April – Simon Cowell, conservationist and television presenter (died 2024)
- 20 April
  - Andrew Jaspan, English-Australian journalist and academic
  - Eric Pickles, British politician
- 21 April – Cheryl Gillan, Welsh politician (died 2021)
- 29 April – David Icke, conspiracy theorist and broadcaster
- 3 May – Allan Wells, Scottish athlete
- 12 May – Nicholas Underhill, barrister and judge
- 14 May – David Byrne, musician
- 23 May
  - Dillie Keane, cabaret performer
  - Martin Parr, documentary colour photographer (died 2025)
- 7 June – Liam Neeson, Northern Irish actor
- 12 June
  - Pete Farndon, English bass player and songwriter (died 1983)
  - Oliver Knussen, Scottish composer (died 2018)
- 17 June – Estelle Morris, politician
- 20 June – Gordon Marshall, sociologist and academic
- 22 June
  - Phil Nicholls, English professional footballer
  - Alastair Stewart, newsreader
- 25 June – Alan Green, Northern Irish sportscaster
- 26 June
  - Simon Mann, English mercenary and army officer (died 2025)
  - Gordon McQueen, Scottish footballer (died 2023)
- 3 July – Andy Fraser, musician and songwriter (died 2015)
- 4 July – John Waite, rock singer, bass guitarist and songwriter
- 6 July – Hilary Mantel, novelist (died 2022)
- 11 July – John Kettley, weather forecaster
- 14 July – Chris Cross, bass guitarist (died 2024)
- 15 July
  - Ann Dowling, mechanical engineer
  - Celia Imrie, actress
- 20 July – Adrian Biddle, cinematographer (died 2005)
- 7 August – Alexei Sayle, comedian
- 12 August – Charlie Whiting, motorsports director (died 2019)
- 18 August – Pete Richens, screenwriter (died 2018)
- 21 August – Joe Strummer, musician (The Clash) (died 2002)
- 24 August – Ian Grob, racing driver
- 25 August – Geoff Downes, keyboardist (Asia)
- 27 September – Katie Fforde, novelist
- 30 September – Jack Wild, child actor and singer (died 2006)
- 7 October – John Caudwell, businessman
- 9 October – Sharon Osbourne, television personality and music manager
- 18 October – Jim Ratcliffe, chemical engineer and businessman
- 19 October – Peter Bone, politician
- 25 October – Wendy Hall, computer scientist
- 26 October – Andrew Motion, Poet Laureate
- 16 November – Roger Bisby, journalist and TV presenter
- 21 November – Terry Lloyd, journalist (killed 2003)
- 24 November – Robin Aitken, journalist
- 1 December – Stephen Poliakoff, playwright and director
- 3 December – Mel Smith, comic actor and director (died 2013)
- 6 December – Charles Bronson, violent criminal
- 8 December – Richard Walsh, actor
- 9 December – C. J. Sansom, novelist (died 2024)
- 10 December – Clive Anderson, broadcast presenter, comedy writer and barrister
- 13 December – Karl Howman, actor
- 20 December – Jenny Agutter, actress
- 26 December – Jon Glover, actor

== Deaths ==
- 6 February – King George VI (born 1895)
- 19 February – Lawrence Grant, actor (born 1870)
- 4 March – Sir Charles Sherrington, physiologist, Nobel Prize laureate (born 1857)
- 15 March – Nevil Sidgwick, chemist (born 1873)
- 5 April – Charles Collett, chief mechanical engineer, Great Western Railway (born 1871)
- 19 April – Steve Conway, singer, of heart condition (born 1920)
- 21 April
  - Leslie Banks, actor (born 1890)
  - Sir Stafford Cripps, Chancellor of the Exchequer (born 1889)
- 5 July – Alison Skipworth, actress (born 1863)
- 6 July – Marian Cripps, Baroness Parmoor, pacifist (born 1878)
- 4/5 August – Sir Jack Drummond, biochemist and nutritionist, murdered with family in France (Dominici affair) (born 1891)
- 6 September – Gertrude Lawrence, actress (born 1898)
- 7 September – Marion Gilchrist, pioneering Scottish medical doctor (born 1864)
- 29 September – John Cobb, racing car and motorboat driver, in speedboat accident (born 1899)
- 30 September – Waldorf Astor, 2nd Viscount Astor, American-born businessman and politician (born 1879)
- 20 October – Basil Radford, actor (born 1897)
- 23 October – Windham Wyndham-Quin, 5th Earl of Dunraven and Mount-Earl, politician, died in Ireland (born 1857)
- 28 October – Billy Hughes, Welsh-descended English-born Prime Minister of Australia (born 1862)
- 8 December – Charles Lightoller, merchant marine officer, second officer of RMS Titanic (born 1874)
- 15 December – Sir William Goscombe John, Welsh-born sculptor (born 1860)
- 19 December – Colonel Sir Charles Close, cartographer (born 1865)
- 26 December – Lyn Harding, Welsh-born actor (born 1867)

== See also ==
Media related to 1952 in the United Kingdom at Wikimedia Commons

- List of British films of 1952
