= Bisby =

Bisby is a surname. Notable people with the surname include:

- Frank Bisby (1945–2011), botanist and pioneer of taxonomy databases
- Guy Richard Bisby (1889–1958), American-Canadian mycologist and plant pathologist
- John Bisby (1876–1945), English footballer
- Louisa Bisby (born 1979), Australian footballer
- Roger Bisby (born 1952), English television presenter and journalist
