= John Stanley, 18th Earl of Derby =

British peer

The Right Honourable The Earl of Derby MC TD DL
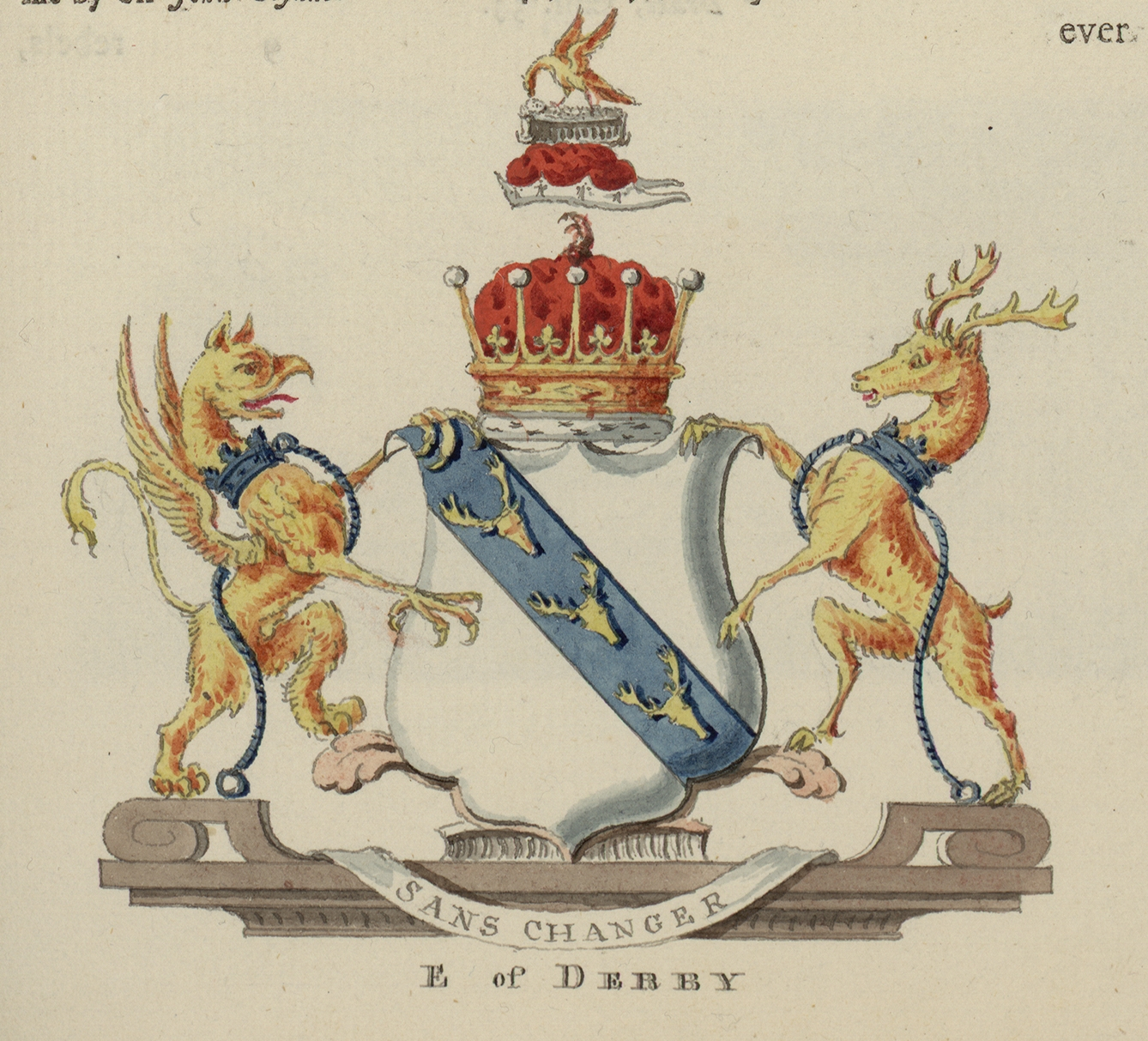
- Arms of the Earls of Derby

Member of the House of Lords
- Lord Temporal
- In office 5 February 1948 – 28 November 1994
- Preceded by: The 17th Earl of Derby
- Succeeded by: The 19th Earl of Derby

Personal details
- Born: Edward John Stanley; 21 April 1918
- Died: 28 November 1994 (aged 76)
- Party: Conservative
- Spouse: Isabel Milles-Lade (m. 1948; died 1990)
- Parent: Edward Stanley, Lord Stanley (father)

Edward John Stanley, 18th Earl of Derby (21 April 1918 – 28 November 1994), styled Lord Stanley from 1938 to 1948, was a British hereditary peer, landowner and businessman.

== Background and education ==
The eldest son of Edward, Lord Stanley, and his wife, the Hon. Sibyl Cadogan, daughter of Viscount Chelsea, his grandfather was Edward Stanley, 17th Earl of Derby, a British Ambassador to Paris.

He was educated at Eton and Magdalen College, Oxford. His father having died in 1938, he succeeded his grandfather in the earldom and other family titles in 1948.

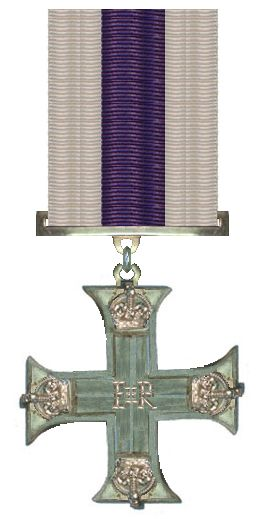
Military Cross

== Military service ==
John Stanley served with the Grenadier Guards in the Second World War, being promoted to Major, and was awarded the Military Cross for gallantry during the Italian Campaign. After the war, he was appointed, in 1947, Lieutenant-Colonel of the King's Regiment (Liverpool) in the Territorial Army (TA), and then as Honorary Colonel of the 5th Battalion, King's Regiment (Liverpool), the fifth Earl of Derby to hold that appointment. He continued in that position with its successors in the Territorial and Army Volunteer Reserve (TAVR) (5th/8th (Volunteer) Battalion, King's Regiment; 4th (Volunteer) Battalion, Queen's Lancashire Regiment; Lancastrian Volunteers) until 1975, and as Colonel of the 1st Battalion, Liverpool Scottish (TA) from 1964.

He was also honorary Captain of the Mersey Division of the Royal Naval Reserve.

== Civilian career ==
A Deputy Lieutenant of Lancashire between 1946 and 1951, Lord Derby was appointed Lord Lieutenant of Lancashire in 1951 in which capacity he served until 1968.

Knowsley Village benefited from his gift of St Mary's Church of England school, playing fields and cottage to the Church Commissioners in 1949, followed by the transfer of the parish benefice to the diocese of Liverpool.

Stanley High School, Southport, which he opened in 1952, was named after him.

Lord Derby was the chairman of Television Wales and the West, from its start in 1958 to its closure in 1968.

He held the honorary titles of Constable of Lancaster Castle between 1972 and 1994, and Pro-Chancellor of Lancaster University between 1964 and 1971.

A director of Martins Bank and of Granada Television, Lord Derby created Knowsley Safari Park in 1971 on his ancestral estate.

The Earl of Derby Scout Troop planted a tree and erected a stone plaque in the grounds of Knowsley Hall in celebration of the quincentenary (1985) of the earldom's creation. Stanley was an active freemason.

He is named as someone who lost a significant amount of money gambling in fast-paced Chemie games at John Aspinall's gambling clubs.

== Family ==
Lord Derby married Isabel Milles-Lade, daughter of the Hon. Henry Milles-Lade, in 1948. Their marriage was childless.

Lady Derby, who survived a deliberate attempt on her life in 1952, died in 1990; Lord Derby survived her by four years and died in 1994, aged 76, being succeeded in the family titles by his nephew, Edward Stanley as the 19th Earl.

== Thoroughbred horse racing ==
Following family tradition, Lord Derby was an owner of thoroughbred racehorses: his gelding Teleprompter won the 1984 Arlington Million at Arlington Park, Illinois.

=== Related article ===
- Epsom Derby

== Arms ==
Coat of arms of John Stanley, 18th Earl of Derby
| Crest On a chapeau gules turned up ermine an eagle, wings extended, or, preying on an infant in its cradle proper, swaddled gules, the cradle laced or. Escutcheon Argent, on a bend azure three stags' heads caboshed or. Supporters Dexter, a griffin, wings elevated; sinister, a stag, each or, and ducally collared with line reflexed over the back azure. Motto Sans changer (Without changing). |

== See also ==
- Earl of Derby
- House of Lords

Peerage of England
| Preceded by Edward Stanley | Earl of Derby; 1948–1994; Member of the House of Lords (1948–1994) | Succeeded by Edward Stanley |
Honorary titles
| Preceded by The Earl Peel | Lord Lieutenant of Lancashire; 1951–1968 | Succeeded by The Lord Rhodes |
