= St Mary's Church, Knowsley =

Coordinates: 53.4562°N 2.8528°W

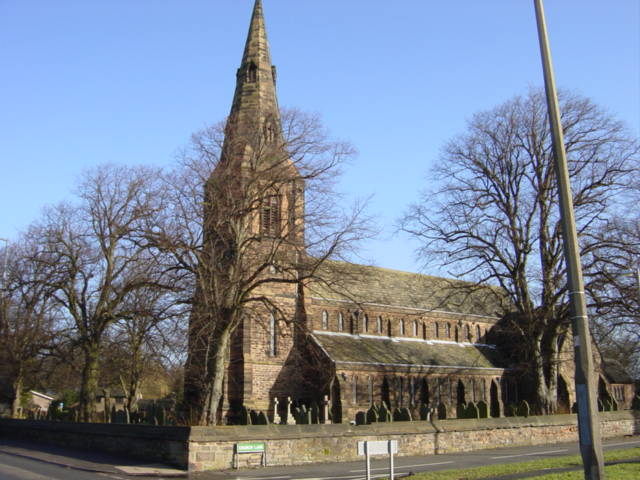
- St Mary's Church, Knowsley, from the southwest

- Location in Merseyside
- OS grid reference: SJ 435,958
- Location: Knowsley, Merseyside
- Country: England
- Denomination: Anglican
- Website: St Mary, Knowsley

History
- Status: Parish church
- Consecrated: 6 June 1844

Architecture
- Functional status: Active
- Heritage designation: Grade II*
- Designated: 28 January 1971
- Architect(s): Edmund Sharpe, Edward Paley; Paley and Austin; Paley, Austin and Paley
- Architectural type: Church
- Style: Gothic revival
- Groundbreaking: 1843
- Completed: 1893

Administration
- Province: York
- Diocese: Liverpool
- Archdeaconry: Liverpool
- Deanery: Huyton
- Parish: St Mary, Knowsley

Clergy
- Vicar: Revd Hugh Lea-Wilson

St Mary's Church is in Knowsley Lane, Knowsley Village, Merseyside, England. The church is recorded in the National Heritage List for England as a designated Grade II* listed building. It is an active Anglican parish church in the diocese of Liverpool, the archdeaconry of Liverpool and the deanery of Huyton. In the Buildings of England series, Pollard and Pevsner describe the church as being "largish" with "an intimate interior".

== History ==
The church was built in 1843–44 to a design by Edmund Sharpe for the 13th Earl of Derby at a cost of about £20,000 (equivalent to £2,200,000 in 2025). It was consecrated on 6 June 1844 by Rt Revd John Bird Sumner, Bishop of Chester. Transepts designed by Edward Paley, Sharpe's successor in the architectural practice, were added in 1860. In 1871–72 a memorial chapel to the 14th Earl of Derby, designed by Paley and Austin, was added. It cost £3,000, which included the cost of a monument with a figure by Matthew Noble. In 1892–93 a new vestry and a new east window by Paley, Austin and Paley were built. An organ was installed in the Derby chapel in 1913. In 1981–82 the church was reordered, a nave altar was introduced, and meeting and service facilities were installed in the base of the tower.

== Architecture ==
=== Exterior ===
The church is constructed in sandstone with freestone dressings and has a stone tile roof. Its architectural style is mainly Early English. The plan of the church consists of a west steeple, a five-bay nave with north and south aisles and a clerestory, a north porch, north and south transepts, a five-bay chancel with a north chapel (formerly the Derby chapel), and a south vestry. The tower is in three stages, with angle buttresses. In the bottom stage is a west doorway with lancet windows above. The middle stage also contains windows with pointed arches. In the top stage are two-light bell openings containing quatrefoil tracery, flanked by blind arches. The tower is surmounted by a broach spire with two tiers of lucarnes. Each bay on the south side of both the aisles and the clerestory contains a pair of windows. The transepts have buttresses, a corbel table, two-light north and south windows in Decorated style, and small west windows. The chancel also has a corbel table. Its east window has five lights with Perpendicular tracery, and the two two-light south windows are in Decorated style. The north chapel is also in Decorated style, and has a four-light north window. Along the north side of the church are three-light windows, and a frieze of quatrefoils. The vestry has a square-headed window and an east doorway re-set from an earlier doorway.

=== Interior ===
The nave arcades are carried on quatrefoil piers with foliage capitals. The chancel arch includes carvings of Queen Victoria and the Archbishop of Canterbury. The nave is floored with 19th-century relief tiles, and there are encaustic tiles in the chapel. Inside the church is an intricately carved bench from Knowsley Hall which is dated 1646, and royal arms dated 1567. The reredos, dating from 1866, was designed by Edwin Stirling. In the Derby chapel is a recumbent alabaster effigy by Matthew Noble of the 14th Earl of Derby. Along the chancel walls are memorial mosaics dating from the 1910s and 1920s. The octagonal font was created in 1890 by Stubbs and Sons of Liverpool. The pulpit is polygonal and dates from about 1946. Stained glass in the church includes the east window of 1893 by Shrigley and Hunt, a window in each transept by Lavers and Barraud, and a window in the south wall of the chancel of 1923 by Powell and Sons. The three-manual organ was made in 1913 by Rushworth and Dreaper of Liverpool.

== External features ==
The churchyard contains the war graves of a soldier of World War I, and two soldiers of World War II.

== See also ==
- Listed buildings in Knowsley, Merseyside
- List of architectural works by Edmund Sharpe
- List of ecclesiastical works by Paley and Austin
