= Listed buildings in Knowsley, Merseyside =

Knowsley is a civil parish in the Metropolitan Borough of Knowsley, Merseyside, England. It contains seven buildings that are recorded in the National Heritage List for England as designated listed buildings. Of these, two are listed at Grade II*, the middle of the three grades, and the others are at Grade II, the lowest grade. The parish is dominated by Knowsley Hall, which is listed. The other listed buildings are a church, a former vicarage, a farmhouse, a lodge, a war memorial, and a school later converted into cottages.

== Key ==
Grade	Criteria
II*	Particularly important buildings of more than special interest
II	Buildings of national importance and special interest

== Buildings ==
Name and location	Photograph	Date	Notes	Grade
Knowsley Hall; 53.43820°N 2.83717°W		15th century (probable)	The country house of the Earls of Derby, it dates mainly from the 18th century. Alterations were made to it in the 19th century and in the early 20th century, and it was reduced in size after the Second World War. The main block is in Georgian style, and is built in red brick with stone dressings. At right angles to this is the south wing, which is in sandstone.	II*
Gelling's Farmhouse; 53.45804°N 2.87071°W	—	17th to 18th century	A stone farmhouse with a slate roof, it is in two storeys. There is an outshut to the right and a 20th-century porch in the angle. The windows are horizontally-sliding sashes.	II
School cottages 53.42845°N 2.84012°W	—	Late 18th century (probable)	Originally built as a school, and later converted into a pair of cottages, the building is in brick with a slate roof. The cottages have two storeys and a symmetrical front, and on the sides are single-storey lean-to porches. The windows are casements.	II
St Mary's Church; 53.45617°N 2.85273°W		1843–44	The church was paid for by the Earls of Derby, it was designed by Edmund Sharpe in Early English style, and was later extended by his successors in the practice. It is built in sandstone with tiled roofs, and consists of a nave with north and south aisles and a clerestory, a north porch, north and south transepts, a chancel with a north chapel, a south vestry, and a west steeple. The steeple has a three-stage tower, and a broach spire with lucarnes.	II*
Little Wood Lodge; 53.44222°N 2.85528°W	—	c. 1880s	Originally a lodge to Croxteth Hall, it is in sandstone with a tiled roof. The lodge is in a single storey, and has an irregular plan, with an octagonal room on the right. The road front has a central protruding gabled bay with two round-headed sash windows and a shield in the gable, and there are similar flanking windows.	II
Old Vicarage; 53.45677°N 2.85162°W	—	c. 1885 (probable)	Originally a vicarage, and later used as a retirement home, it is in Queen Anne style. The building is in brick with tile-hanging, dressings in terracotta and sandstone, and a tiled roof. It has two storeys, it is in an irregular double-pile plan, and has three fronts of three bays. On the south front is a two-storey gabled porch, and elsewhere there are oriel windows.	II
War Memorial; 53.45729°N 2.85333°W		1920	The war memorial stands is a triangular piece of land in the village centre. It is in Portland stone with a surround in pink stone. It consists of a Latin cross, on a square plinth, on two steps. There is an inscription on the plinth relating to both World Wars.	II
