= Knowsley Hall shootings =

1952 event in Merseyside, England

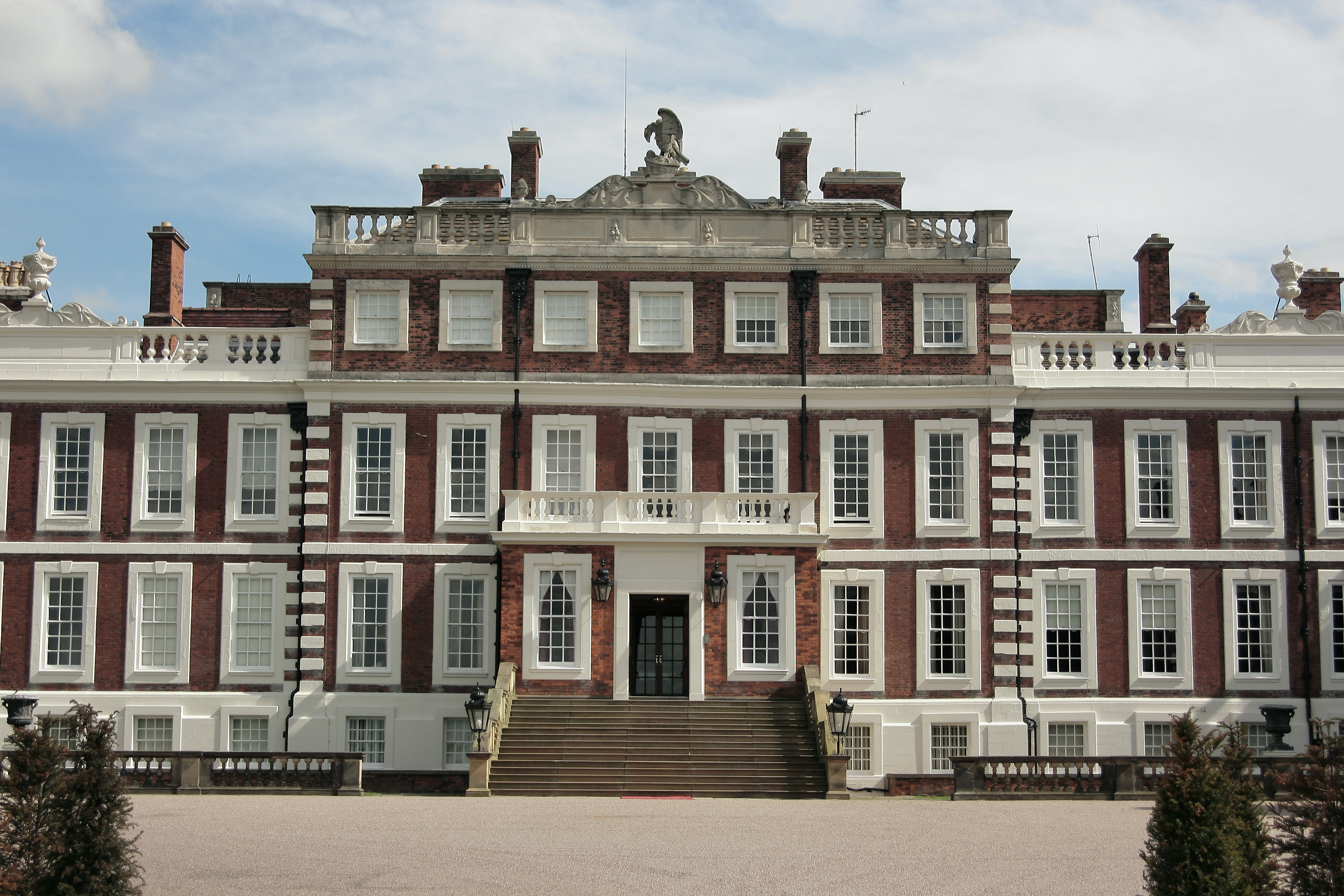
- The front entrance of Knowsley Hall, pictured in 2011
- Location: 53°26′17″N 02°50′15″W; Knowsley Hall, Merseyside, England
- Date: 9 October 1952; 74 years ago ~8:15 p.m. – 8:45 p.m. (UTC+00:00)
- Attack type: Mass shooting
- Weapon: 9mm MP 40 sub-machine gun
- Deaths: 2
- Injuries: 2
- Perpetrator: Harold Winstanley
- Motive: Unestablished

Shootings occurred on the evening of 9 October 1952 in Knowsley Hall, Merseyside, (Note: Merseyside was established as a ceremonial and metropolitan county in 1974; before then Knowsley Hall lay in the county of Lancashire.) England. Harold Winstanley, a 19-year-old trainee footman at the house, shot his employer, Lady Derby, and three colleagues, two of whom died: the butler, William Stallard, and the under-butler, Douglas Stuart. Winstanley fled the scene, assaulting the chef while doing so, and went to a local pub. He later took a bus into Liverpool, where he surrendered to the police. Winstanley was tried for the two murders and found guilty but insane and committed to Broadmoor Hospital.

== Background ==
Knowsley Hall is the ancestral home of the Earls of Derby, located in Merseyside, England. In 1952, it was the residence of John Stanley, 18th Earl of Derby, and his wife, Isabel, Countess of Derby, daughter of Henry Milles-Lade. The couple had married in 1948 and were childless. In contrast with some other aristocratic families, who had downsized their staffs considerably to save costs in the post-war years, the Derbys continued to maintain a large staff at Knowsley, though much of the house was unused and shut off.

Among the staff was Harold Winstanley, a 19-year-old trainee footman. Winstanley had been born in Aintree, around 5 miles (8.0 km) north-west of Knowsley Hall. His father had died when Winstanley was three years old, and some of his siblings and half-siblings had been taken into care. Winstanley remained with his mother and studied at Walton Technical College, where he performed well academically. Winstanley's mother was admitted to a mental institution in August 1946 and remained there until after the events of 1952. After her committal, Winstanley spent some time in an orphanage.

Winstanley had briefly served with the Scots Guards, but was invalided on account of tuberculosis. After his discharge, he spent a period with the Royal Liverpool Golf Club in Wirral, before joining the staff at Knowsley Hall on 15 December 1951. Winstanley was trained in his role by the house's 40-year-old butler, William Stallard, and 29-year-old under-butler, Douglas Stuart, and was well regarded by his colleagues.

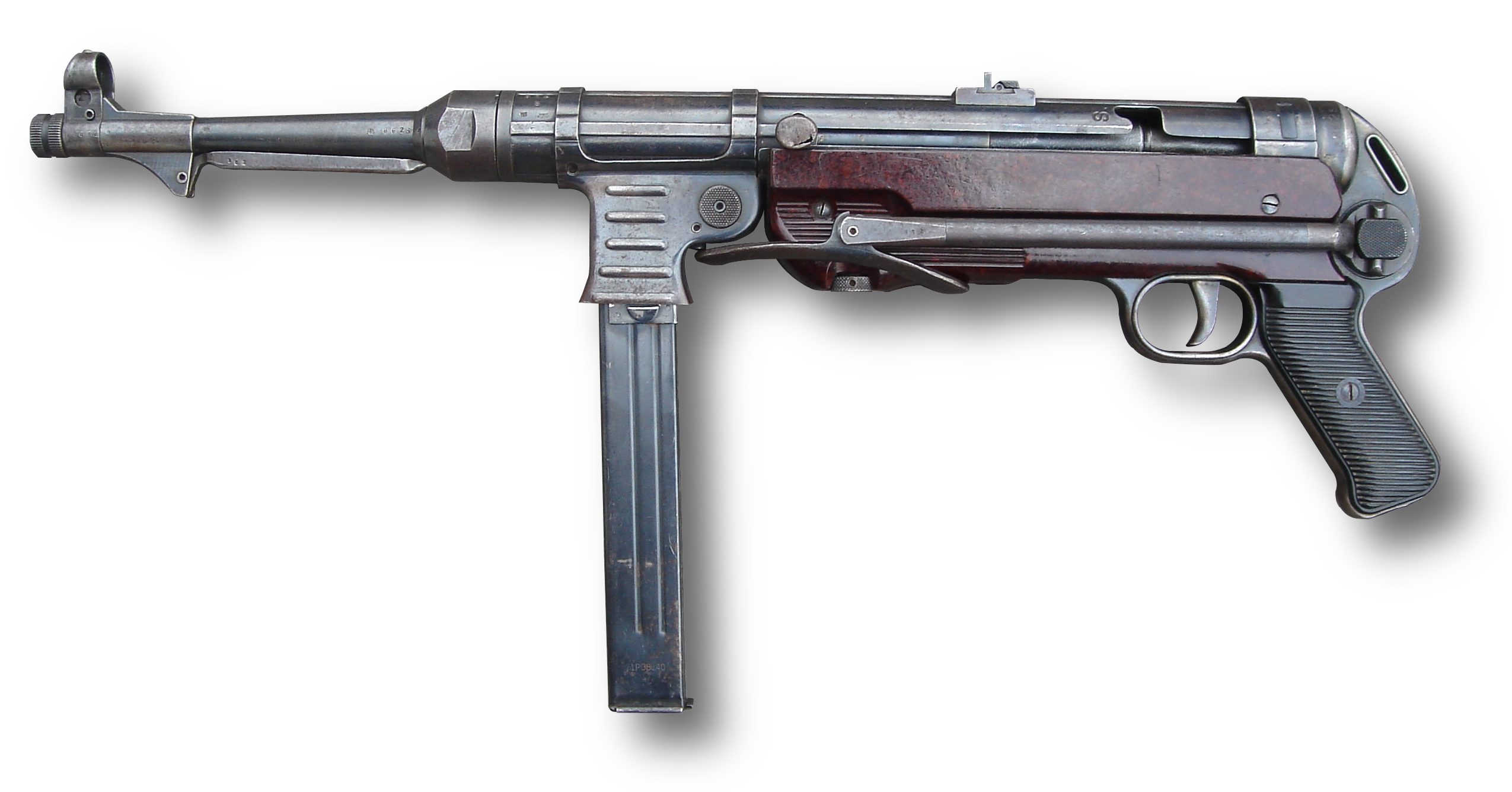
MP 40 submachine gun

On 7 October 1952, Winstanley met a friend at Hoylake and became aware that he owned an MP 40 submachine gun, originally taken as a trophy during the Second World War. (Note: The weapon is referred to as a "9mm Schmeisser" in some reporting. The 9 mm caliber MP 40 sub-machine gun, developed by Nazi Germany during the Second World War, was commonly known as a Schmeisser after the weapon designer Hugo Schmeisser. Schmeisser played no role in developing the MP 40, though he did help design the MP 41 variant, which saw very limited production.) Winstanley expressed an interest in the weapon and agreed to purchase it, together with 400 rounds of ammunition, for £3 (equivalent to £75 in 2025) and a pair of trousers. His intention was to use it to shoot rabbits on the estate.

Winstanley took possession of the MP 40 at 5:00 pm on 8 October and smuggled it into Knowsley Hall down his trousers. That evening, he filled the gun's magazines, finding he possessed only 200 rounds. He test-fired the gun in the grounds, showing it to a servant named Cooke. On 9 October, he cleaned and oiled the weapon and showed it to Anne Mitchell, a housemaid, telling her to keep it secret as he could be arrested for not having a gun licence. Later in the day, he asked Lord Derby's secretary when Lord Derby was expected home, but the secretary did not know.

== Shootings ==
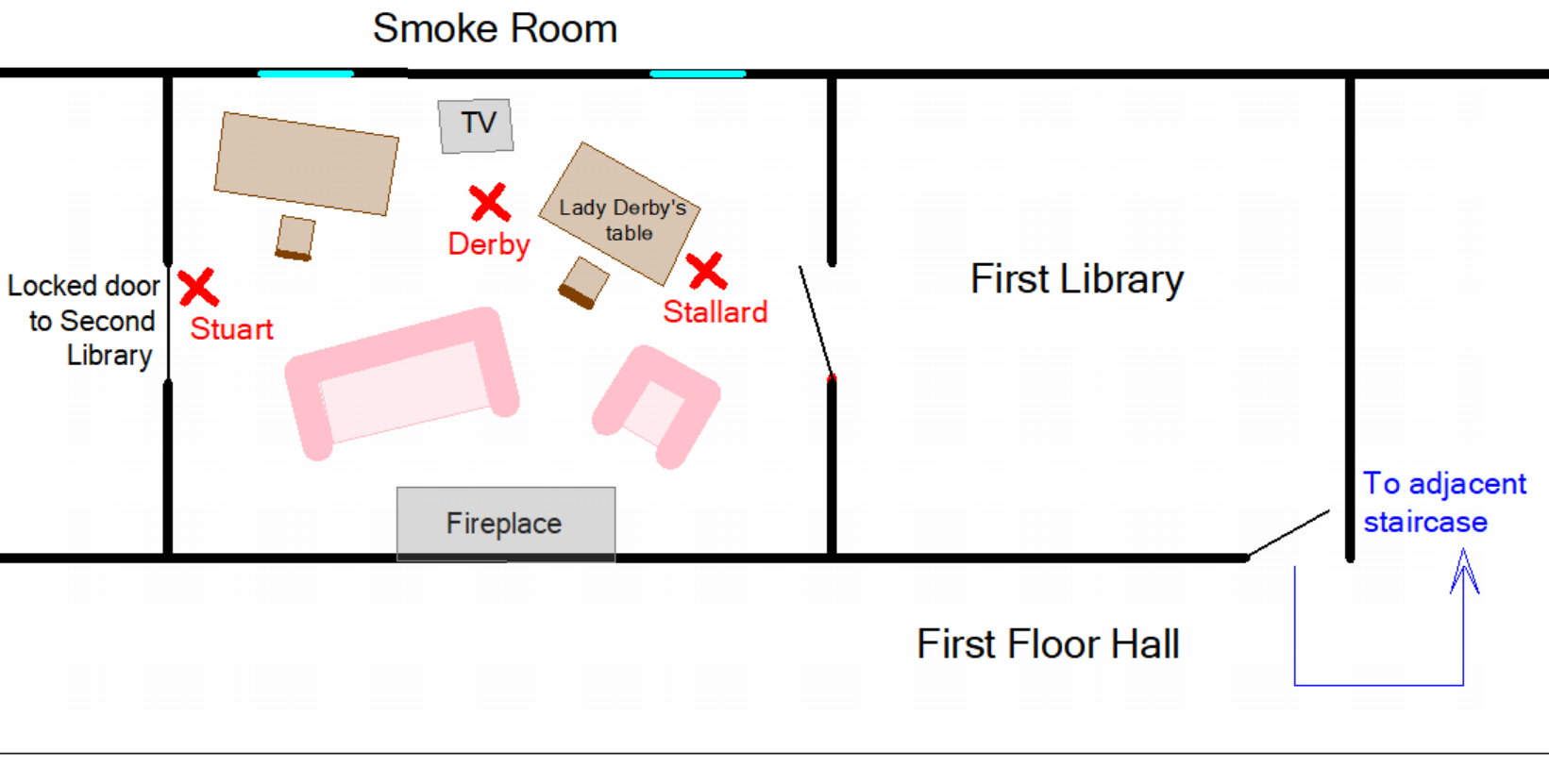
Layout of the smoke room showing locations where the victims were found

At around 8:15 pm, Lady Derby was dining alone in the first-floor smoke room. She was eating a dinner brought to her by the staff while seated at a table facing the corner of the room, watching a television set to her left. The door from the first library was to her right, and the locked door to the second library was to her left.

Winstanley entered the room from the first library, smoking a cigarette, which was not permitted for the staff. Lady Derby asked him what he wanted, stood up, and turned to face him when she noticed he was holding the MP 40. Winstanley told Lady Derby to turn around, and when she did, he shot her. Lady Derby was wounded slightly in the neck and fell forwards onto the floor, where she feigned death. She was struck by one round, which had entered the back of her neck and exited near her left ear. In a statement made to the police after his arrest, (Note: At the trial, Winstanley's defence barristers applied for this statement to be discounted over the circumstances in which it had been taken, but the judge permitted the statement to be read after a short delay.) Winstanley said he had intended to ask Lady Derby to help him dispose of the gun but had shot her after he became frightened. He said he told her to turn around as he did not want to shoot her when she was looking at him.

As she lay on the floor, Lady Derby heard Stallard enter and address Winstanley before he was shot and killed. Stallard was hit by five bullets, two of which caused fatal wounds to his head. It was established at the trial that Stallard was responding to the staff call bell activated from the smoke room, and the prosecution stated that only Winstanley was in a position to do so. The prosecution maintained that Winstanley had hidden in the first library as Stallard passed through and shot him after he entered the smoke room.

After Stallard's killing, Lady Derby also heard Stuart, who is thought to have heard the first shots and come to investigate, enter the smoke room and say "no". He pleaded for his life, noting that he had a wife, to which Winstanley told him "I will look after your wife" before shooting a burst of fire. Stuart made for the locked door to the second library but was hit by a second burst of fire and killed. He was struck by five bullets in the head, chest, and abdomen, and the police surgeon thought that all bar one would have been fatal alone. The police determined that 17 shots had been fired in the smoke room, all from a position near the door to the first library. They thought seven had been directed at Lady Derby and five each at the butlers.

After killing the two men, Winstanley moved to the first-floor hall where he met William Sullivan, Lord Derby's valet. Sullivan had heard the shots from the second floor and moved to investigate. Sullivan asked Winstanley what he was doing, but he did not answer, instead asking Mitchell and another housemaid, watching from the floor above, to come down. When the housemaids refused, Sullivan ran downstairs to the ground floor, pursued by Winstanley. On reaching the ground floor, Winstanley opened fire, wounding Sullivan in the hand with one of eleven shots. Sullivan collapsed into the entrance to the lift shaft, and Winstanley was aiming at him when other staff arrived on the scene.

The housekeeper, Kilda Turley, placed herself between Winstanley and Sullivan and tried to calm the shooter down. Winstanley told her he had killed Stallard, Stuart, and Lady Derby (Note: Winstanley mistakenly thought he had killed Lady Derby and expressed surprise when he was later told that she survived her injuries.) but would not hurt the female staff. Turley made to call for the police, but Winstanley threatened to shoot her if she did. In the meantime, Lady Derby's lady's maid, Doxford, had found her and called the police from an upstairs telephone at 8:45 pm. Winstanley went to his room on the ground floor to get his coat, and the chef, Dupuy, tried to reason with him. Dupuy tried to seize the gun as they walked down a corridor to the exit. Winstanley struck him over the head with it, causing nine rounds to discharge into the wall. Dupuy was only lightly wounded in the head. Winstanley then left the house.

== Police search ==
The Lancashire County Police responded to the call, with eighteen patrol cars routed to Knowsley Hall by radio. A police surgeon treated Lady Derby and took her to the Liverpool Royal Infirmary in his car. Superintendent W. J. Wooff of the Lancashire County Police took charge of the search for Winstanley. Some 100 officers from the Leigh, Seaforth, Wigan and Widnes divisions were mobilised and additional detectives were sent from the neighbouring Liverpool City Police. The search eventually involved some 200 officers.

Winstanley had gone to the Coppull House, (Note: The 1958 1:1,250 Ordnance Survey mapping shows a "Copple House Hotel" public house in Fazakerley, around 4 miles (6.4 km) north-west of Knowsley House) a local public house, where he drank a pint of beer. He then caught a bus to Liverpool city centre where, at 11:42 pm, he called 9-9-9 from a public telephone box to hand himself in. Liverpool City Police officers arrested him as he was in the act of leaving the phone box and pulling the gun from under his coat. On arrest, Winstanley said repeatedly, "I don't know why I did it". The MP 40 was recovered with a round in the breech and one full magazine, and 131 loose rounds were recovered from Winstanley's person. Under police questioning, Winstanley admitted to carrying out the shootings.

== Trial ==
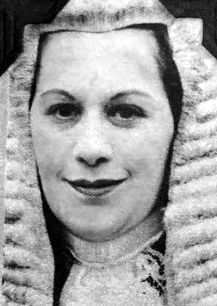
Rose Heilbron, pictured in 1949

Winstanley was charged with the murders of Stallard and Stuart. He was brought before Prescot Magistrate's Court for a committal hearing at 10:34 am on 5 November. F. D. Barry led the prosecution case, and solicitor Rex Makin the defence. Some 23 witnesses attended, including Lady Derby. The bench of three magistrates judged that there was sufficient evidence to proceed, and the case of the murder of Stallard was committed to trial at the court of assizes. The charge of the murder of Stuart was left to lie on the books. (Note: A case left on the books at the Crown Court in England and Wales is not proceeded with but can be brought against the defendant at a later stage.) Winstanley was held on remand in Walton Gaol.

At the Manchester Assizes in December, the charge was prosecuted by Henry Ince Nelson QC and Robert Shenstone Nicklin and his defence led by Rose Heilbron QC (Note: The selection of Heilbron, England's first female Queen's Counsel, attracted considerable press attention because of her gender. Because she served in this case Heilbron missed the opportunity to defend Derek Bentley who was charged for the murder of a policeman; his conviction was the subject of a miscarriage of justice and was quashed decades after his execution.) and George Currie; the judge was Mr Justice Jones. The defence did not dispute the facts of the killings and focused instead on Winstanley's previous good character and his state of mind at the time of the shootings. Heilbron suggested that Winstanley had suffered a schizophrenic episode and could not, at that time, distinguish between right and wrong. The only witness called by the defence was Francis Brisby, the medical officer at Walton Gaol, who stated that Winstanley had schizophrenia. Heilbron told the jury that Winstanley had suffered a change in mental state: "this normally pleasant young man had become a man with staring eyes ... this man went berserk with the gun".

The case concluded on 16 December. The jury did not need to retire to consider their decision but, in a conference in the jury box, quickly returned a verdict of guilty but insane on the count of murder of Stallard. Justice Jones ordered Winstanley to be detained at Her Majesty's pleasure, and he was committed to Broadmoor Hospital. No motive for the killings was ever established, with Winstanley and the other staff stating that relations with their employers were amicable.

== Legacy ==
Lady Derby made a full recovery from her injury and lived until 1990.

In the aftermath of the killings Lord Derby ordered that the doors to the smoke room be locked indefinitely. The killings, together with Lord Derby's role as lord lieutenant, that meant he would need to welcome Elizabeth II to Lancashire on a visit in 1954, led to him ordering a remodelling of Knowsley Hall by architect Claud Phillimore, 4th Baron Phillimore. As around 40 house rooms were unused, and to save their heating expense and the risk of dry rot, Phillimore decided on a considerable reduction in the floor plan. Between January 1953 and April 1954, an entire wing of the house and a library were demolished, reducing the footprint by a third. Considerable remodelling was also carried out to the servants' quarters. This was the last time an English home was designed to accommodate a large domestic staff. Winstanley was later released from Broadmoor; thereafter, he would write to solicitor Rex Makin every year, updating him on his life.
