= Knowsley, Merseyside =

Coordinates: 53.4498°N 2.8501°W

Knowsley Village
- Village and Civil Parish
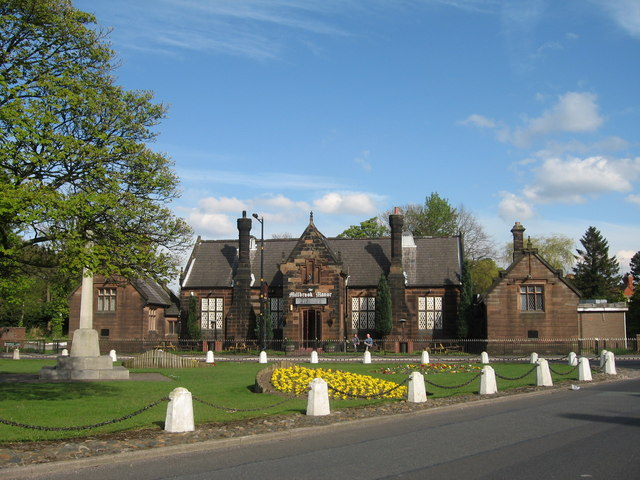
- Knowsley village green

- Location within Merseyside
- Population: 11,343 (2001 Census)
- OS grid reference: SJ435951
- Civil parish: Knowsley
- Metropolitan borough: Knowsley
- Metropolitan county: Merseyside
- Region: North West
- Country: England
- Sovereign state: United Kingdom
- Post town: PRESCOT
- Postcode district: L34
- Dialling code: 0151
- Police: Merseyside
- Fire: Merseyside
- Ambulance: North West
- UK Parliament: Knowsley

Knowsley (/ˈnoʊzli/), commonly known as Knowsley Village, is a large village and civil parish in Merseyside located on the north-east outskirts of Liverpool, within the much larger Metropolitan Borough of Knowsley It gave its name to the wider borough when it was formed in 1974.

Within the boundaries of the historic county of Lancashire, at the 2001 Census it had a population of 11,343. The parish includes Knowsley Hall and Knowsley Safari Park. There are three main built-up areas in the parish: the village of Knowsley itself, the southern end of the nearby Knowsley Business Park to the north, and in the south-west a suburban area including Stockbridge Village and the northern fringe of Huyton. To the west of Knowsley is the area of Woolfall Heath.

== General information ==
Knowsley Village consists primarily of two residential areas: a council estate, and a private estate. There is a parade of shops on Sugar Lane that serve the local community.

The village has one public house, The Derby Arms. A second pub, the Pipe and Gannex, was demolished in 2018. There are two public parks, The Rec, off Knowsley Lane, and Mill Lane, as well a woodland in the centre of the village, Syders Grove.

Millbrook Manor, a prominent building on the village green, served as the Village school until the 1980s, when it was redeveloped as a restaurant. As of 2019, it was being converted into residential accommodation.

The village has two churches, the Anglican St Mary's and the Roman Catholic St John Fisher. St Mary's is a grade II listed building built by the Stanley family in the late 19th century.

== History ==
The name derives from the Anglo-Saxon Cēnwulfes lēah, meaning "Cēnwulf's wood/clearing".

The village of Knowsley is hundreds of years older than the neighbouring city of Liverpool. Its name occurs in the Domesday Book of 1086 as Chenulveslei in the ancient hundred of West Derby in South Lancashire, and has been recorded as Knuvesle (1199); Knouselegh (1258); Knouleslee (1261); Knusele (1262); and Knouslegh (1346).

There are a few notable entries in Knowsley's history:

- King Henry VII visited in 1495.
- William Shakespeare is said to have performed in a play held in Knowsley in 1589.
- Capability Brown is responsible for creating some of Knowsley's landscaped gardens in the 1770s.
- Edward Lear wrote "The Owl and the Pussycat" while staying at Knowsley Hall.

From 1895 the area was part of Whiston Rural District in Lancashire. On 1 April 1974 the village became part of the newly formed Metropolitan Borough of Knowsley in the nascent administrative county of Merseyside.

== See also ==
- Listed buildings in Knowsley, Merseyside
