= Professional Builder UK =

Professional Builder UK is a UK-based trade magazine and website featuring building products, news, legislation updates, information on UK Building Regulations, step-by-step installations and product tests relevant to the small to medium-sized builder.

The magazine is published 11 times a year (with a joint July/August issue) and is owned by trade publisher Hamerville Media Group. It is free to the trade and is distributed via builders merchant counters in the UK. Professional Builder is edited by Terry Smith, and the products editor is Roger Bisby.
