= Species 2000 =

Federated taxonomic database system for species checklists

- Founded: 1996
- Type: Non-governmental organization
- Purpose: taxonomic database
- Website: www.sp2000.org

Species 2000 is a federation of database organizations around the world that compiles the Catalogue of Life, a comprehensive checklist of the world's species, in partnership with the Integrated Taxonomic Information System (ITIS). The creation of Species 2000 was initiated by Frank Bisby and colleagues at the University of Reading in the UK in 1997 and the Catalogue of Life was first published in 2001. While administrators and member organizations of Species 2000 are located around the world, the secretariat is located at the Naturalis Biodiversity Center in Leiden, Netherlands.
