= Frank Bisby =

Botanist and pioneer in developing taxonomy databases (1945–2011)

Frank Ainley Bisby
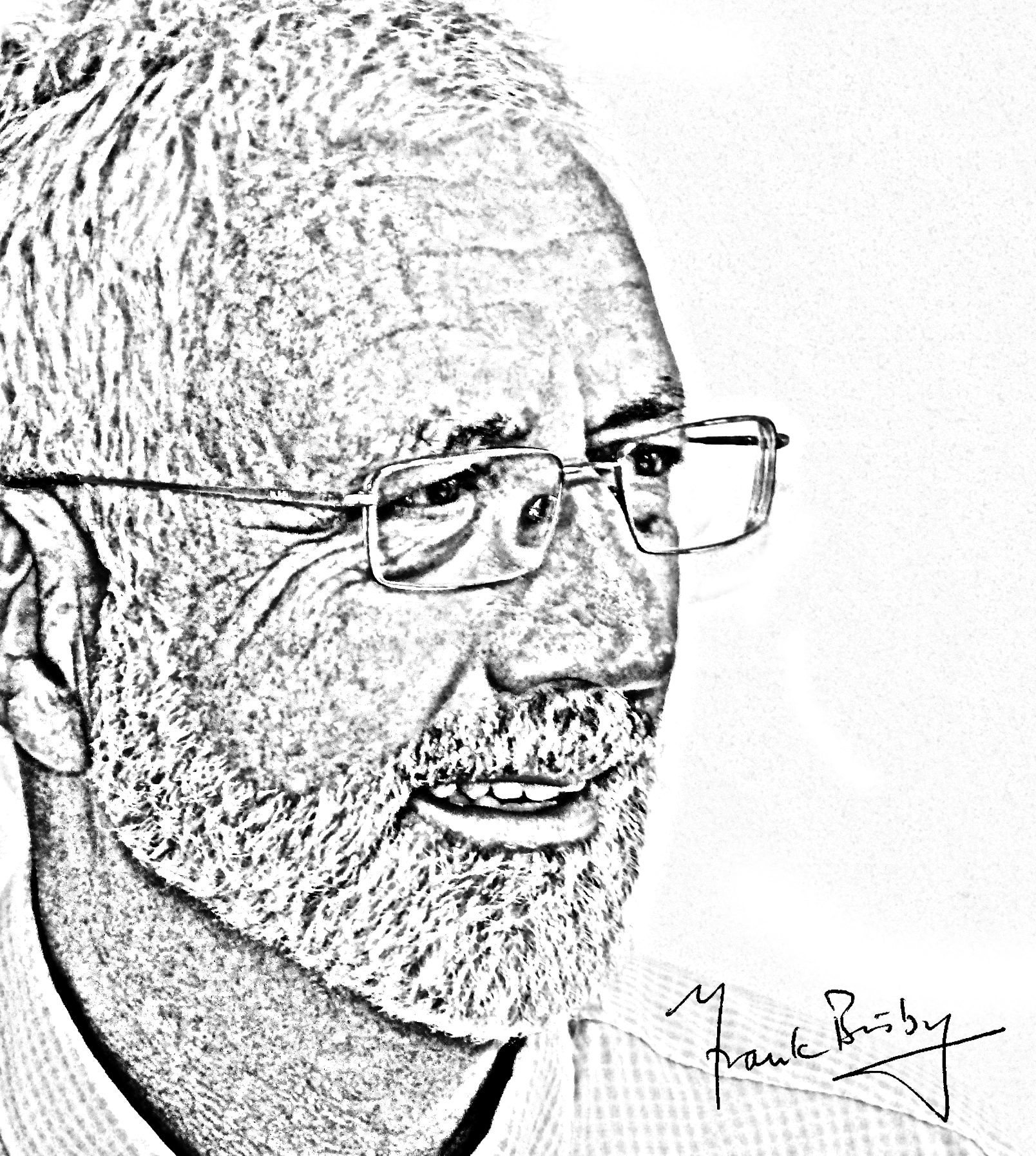
- Born: April 24, 1945; United Kingdom
- Died: October 25, 2011 (aged 66); Reading, United Kingdom
- Education: St. John’s College, University of Oxford
- Known for: The Catalogue of Life, Species 2000, ILDIS, TDWG
- Scientific career
- Fields: Botany, Biodiversity informatics
- Workplaces: The University of Reading, UK; University of Southampton, UK

Frank Ainley Bisby (April 24, 1945 – October 25, 2011) was a botanist who specialized in legumes, and was a pioneer in the development of taxonomic databases. He is noted for his work in founding Species 2000 in 1997, which coordinated the publication of the Catalogue of Life, the most comprehensive catalogue of species. Bisby was the first chair of the Taxonomic Database Working Group (TDWG), which was founded in 1985. Bisby continued to lead significant projects, including the International Legume Database and Information Service (ILDIS). He served as a professor of botany at the University of Reading for most of his career.

After his PhD at Oxford University he worked with the University of Southampton before becoming a professor in botany at Reading University.
