= Knowsley Safari Park =

Zoo in Merseyside, England

Knowsley Safari
- Knowsley Safari Logo
- Interactive map of Knowsley Safari
- 53.442°N 2.812°W
- Date opened: 1971; 55 years ago
- Location: Prescot, Merseyside, England
- Land area: 550 acres (220 ha)
- No. of animals: 700+
- Memberships: BIAZA, EAZA
- Website: knowsleysafariexperience.co.uk

Knowsley Safari is a safari park and tourist attraction in Prescot, Merseyside, England. It is a member of the British and Irish Association of Zoos and Aquariums (BIAZA) and the European Association of Zoos and Aquaria (EAZA). It contributes to conservation and research through links with conservation projects and its links with universities in nearby Liverpool, as well as Chester and Manchester. The Channel 4 series Secret Life of the Safari Park was filmed here.

== History ==
The Safari Park was opened in July 1971 in the parklands of Knowsley Hall by Edward Stanley, 18th Earl of Derby and Jimmy Chipperfield using the expertise of general manager Laurence Tennant MBE, formerly the Chief Game Warden of Parks in Uganda and Botswana. Initially the road through the park was 3.5 miles (5.6 km), with visitors driving past lions, cheetahs, monkeys, giraffes, zebras, elephants and various antelopes. Due to the popularity of this route, an additional 1.5 miles (2.4 km) of road was added in 1973, and camels, buffaloes, white rhinos, and tigers were added to the park. Over the years, a few modifications have been made. For instance, tigers are now displayed in enclosures within the reserve, and a bypass around the baboons was built for visitors who are worried about damage to their cars.

The park was also home to a former RAF airfield which closed at the end of World War II. The RAF airbase situated at the safari park was also known as No 49 SLG or RAF Knowsley Park and was in use between 13 May 1942 – November 1944.

The park has hosted several sporting events including the Olympic torch relay, watched by 6,000 children and families in June 2012. The park hosted the finish of Stage Two of the 2012 Tour of Britain cycling event and hosted Stage Three of the 2013 Tour in September of that year.

== Zoological collection ==
Situated around Knowsley Hall on the ancestral estate of the Earl of Derby, the reserve is home to different animals. The Derby Estate have a tradition of keeping animals, ever since the artist and nonsense-poet Edward Lear was employed there in the 19th century to paint pictures of the Earl's collection.

=== Olive Baboons ===
The park is open to the public and customers drive around the park in their vehicles. There is a bypass route past the baboons for those who wish to avoid the risk of the baboons damaging their cars. In 2009 the baboons made the news all over the world when a video was released showing how they were intelligent and curious enough to open car roofboxes.

=== Amur Tiger Trail ===
Amur Tiger Trail opened 25 May 2018, home to the Amur Tiger otherwise known as the Siberian Tiger. The area is 10,000 m^{2} (12,000 sq yd) and includes forested areas, natural streams and ponds.

=== The Equatorial Trail ===
This exhibit focuses on animals who thrive in habitats around the Earth's Equator. The exhibit also houses the 'Equatorial Express', a small train which visitors can ride to gain a unique viewpoint of the animals. 4 animal species are housed in this exhibit, the South American tapir, Sitatunga, Rhea and the Capybara.

=== African Elephant ===
Until 2017 the park housed a herd of 4 adult cows named Tana, Ashanti, Nala and Juba. They were transported to ZooParc de Beauval, France to enter the European Breeding Programme and allow for transformations on Knowsley Safari's Foot Safari. Knowsley previously housed a bull named Nissim, who collapsed in June 2014. Knowsley also recently lost their cow named Shaba due to a long battle with elephant arthritis.

=== Southern White Rhinoceros ===
Knowsley's crash of 11 adult rhinos is one of the most successful and genetically diverse breeding groups in Europe. The latest calf (as at 4 June 2016), Nomvula (Mother of Rain – a reference to the recent wet weather), born to mum Meru and is the 19th to be born at the facility in the last 40 years. Nomvula is Meru's 6th calf and was born on 2 January 2016.

== Safari Drive ==
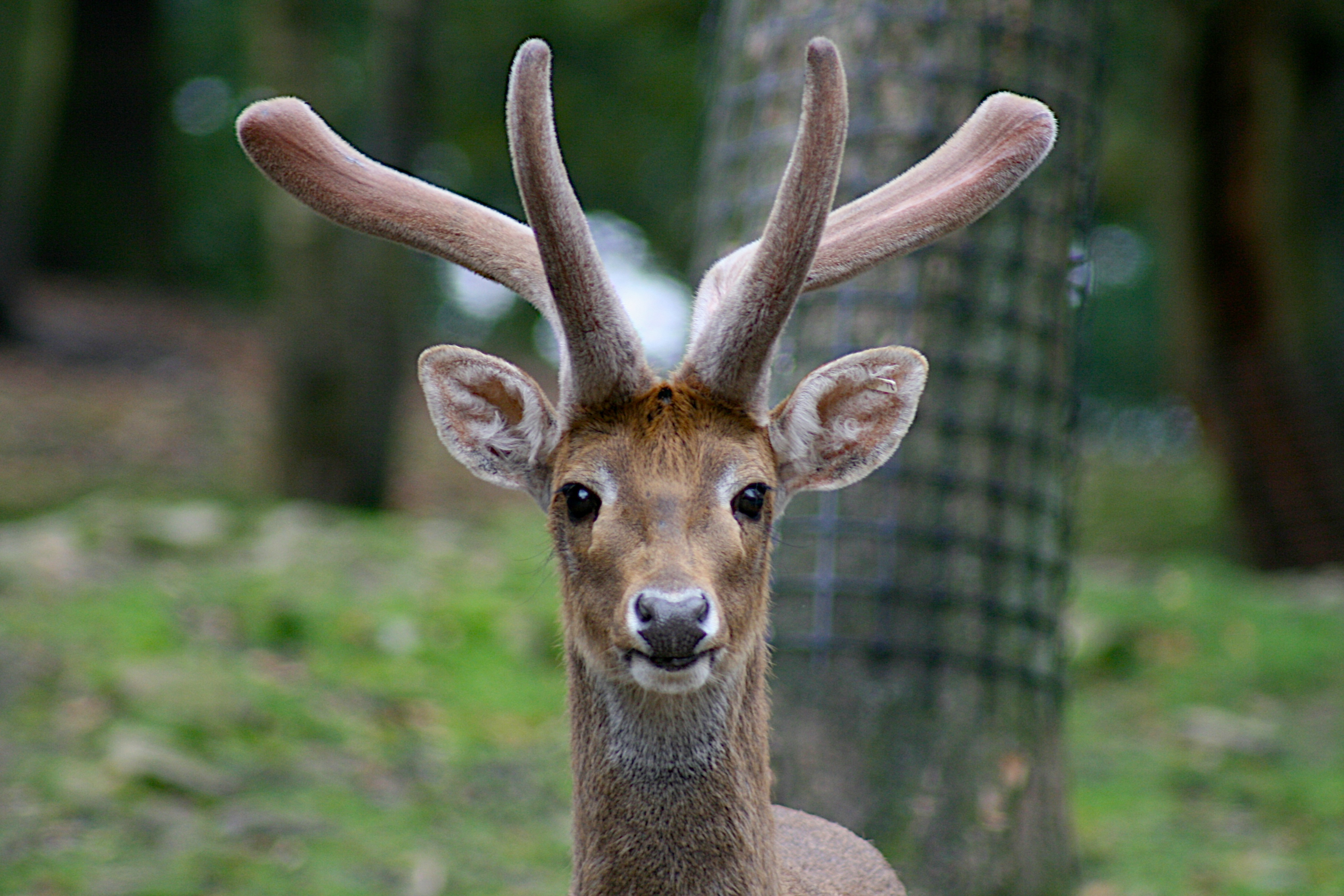
A deer at the park in 2006

=== Eastern Asia | Zones 1 + 11 ===
- Bactrian camel
- Eastern kiang
- Père David's deer
- Domestic yak

=== Southern Asia | Zones 2 + 8 ===
- Axis deer
- Nilgai
- Blackbuck
- Eld's deer

=== African Savannah | Zones 3, 4, 6, 7 + 10 ===
- Southern white rhino
- Common eland
- Waterbuck
- Brindled wildebeest
- Roan antelope
- Forest buffalo
- Somali wild ass
- Ostrich
- Kafue lechwe
- Olive Baboon
- African lion

=== African Woodland | Zone 5 ===
- Sitatunga

=== Eurasia | Zone 9 ===
- European bison
- Fallow deer
- Iberian wolf

== Foot Safari ==
- Nubian giraffe
- Andean bear
- Amur tiger
- Bush dog
- Red river hog
- Lowland tapir
- Meerkat
- Capybara
- Vicuña
- Hooded vulture
- European eagle owl
- California sea lion

== Railway and other attractions ==
The park features a 381 mm (15.0 in) gauge railway, 'The Lakeside Railway', on which visitors may tour parts of the site. There is also a collection of amusements and fairground rides on site plus paintballing, off-road driving challenges, and aerial extreme ropewalks.

A baboon house was added in 2006, along with African wild dogs that same year, a lion and tiger house in 2007. Red river hogs and marmosets were also added to the walkaround section, as well as an outdoor pool.

=== Animal care ===
In January 2011, local animal rights activists held a peaceful demonstration after an inspection by government vets found one instance of a breach of regulations on the disposal of animal ‘by-products’. The park has since installed an enclosure for the storage of animal carcasses before disposal.
