= Claud Phillimore, 4th Baron Phillimore =

English architect

Claud Stephen Phillimore, 4th Baron Phillimore (15 January 1911 – 29 March 1994) was an English architect specialising in larger country houses who succeeded to his family's title in 1990.

He was educated at Trinity College, Cambridge, where he was a member of the Pitt Club.

He was married to Anne Elizabeth Dorrien-Smith (b.1911), daughter of Major Arthur Dorrien-Smith. Their son Francis Stephen Phillimore (b. 1944) succeeded as 5th Baron Phillimore.

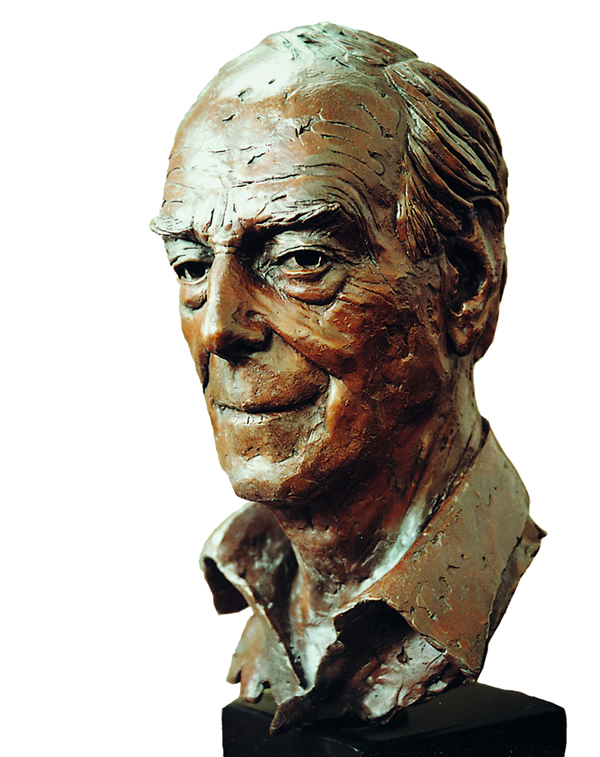
Bronze bust of Claud Stephen Phillimore, 4th Baron Phillimore, by sculptor Laurence Broderick

== Architectural works ==
These include:

- Knowsley Hall, Prescot, Merseyside, (1953–54), reduction and reconstruction of the hall; construction of the New House in the grounds.
- 11 Binney Street, Mayfair, London (1957), interior remodelled with Aubrey Jenkins for Viscount Ridley.
- Brocklesby Hall, Lincolnshire, (1957-58), drastic reduction and remodelling.
- The Dower House in the grounds of Arundel Castle, Sussex, (1959).
- The Durdans, Epsom, Surrey (1950s), reduction and reconstruction.
- Killruddery House, Bray, County Wicklow, Republic of Ireland (1950s), reduction and reconstruction.
- Rademon House, Crossgar, County Down, Northern Ireland - 1950s, rebuilt after a fire.
- Aske Hall, North Yorkshire, (1963-4), demolition of ballroom and reduction of wings.
- Tusmore House, Oxfordshire, (1964), demolished.
- Villa Foscari near Venice, Italy: renovation work; Phillimore inherited the house in 1965 from Alberto Clinton Landsberg, but sold it to architect Prof. Antonio ("Tonci"), Count Foscari (b. 1938), in 1973.
- 23 St Anselm's Place, Mayfair, London, (1966–67) as a private residence for the fourth Duke of Westminster.
- Cubberley, a house in the Wye Valley, Herefordshire (1971), replacing an earlier house.

== Arms ==
Coat of arms of Claud Phillimore, 4th Baron Phillimore
Crest In front of a tower Argent thereon a falcon volant Proper holding in the beak a lure Gold three cinqeufoils fesswise Or. Escutcheon Sable three bars indented Erminois in chief an anchor between two cinqeufoils Or. Supporters On either side an owl Proper each charged with an anchor Or. Motto Fortem Posce Animum (Pray For A Brave Soul)

Baronetage of the United Kingdom
Preceded by Robert Phillimore	Baron Phillimore; 1990–1994	Succeeded by Francis Phillimore
