= Phil Nicholls =

English footballer

Personal information
- Date of birth: 22 June 1952 (age 74)
- Place of birth: Bilston, England
- Position: Central defender

Senior career*
Years	Team	Apps	(Gls)
1970–1972	Wolverhampton Wanderers	0	(0)
1972–1977	Crewe Alexandra	163	(8)
1977–1978	Bradford City	21	(2)
1978–1979	Crewe Alexandra	13	(0)
- Kidderminster Harriers
Total		197	(10)
- * Club domestic league appearances and goals

Phil Nicholls (born 22 June 1952) is an English former professional footballer who played as a central defender.

== Career ==
Born in Bilston, Nicholls played for Wolverhampton Wanderers, Crewe Alexandra, Bradford City and Kidderminster Harriers.
