= Robin Aitken =

British journalist

Robin Aitken MBE
- Born: Robin Peter Aitken; 24 November 1952 (age 73)
- Occupation: Journalist
- Employer: BBC
- Notable work: Can We Trust the BBC?
- Spouse: Sarah Aitken
- Children: 2

Robin Peter Aitken MBE (born 24 November 1952) is a British journalist who for many years worked for the BBC. His 2007 book Can We Trust the BBC? alleged pervasive and institutional left-wing bias at the BBC. In 2018 he published a second book about the BBC 'The Noble Liar; how and why the BBC distorts the news to promote a liberal agenda'. He has held a seminar on this subject at the Thomas More Institute. He is co-founder of the Oxford Foodbank and was appointed Member of the Order of the British Empire (MBE) in the 2014 Birthday Honours for services to vulnerable people.

== Personal life ==
Aitken, a Roman Catholic, is married to Sarah and has two daughters. He lives in Oxford.

== Works ==
- Can We Trust the BBC?. Continuum. 2007. ISBN 978-0-8264-9427-6.
- Can We Still Trust the BBC?. Bloomsbury. 2013. ISBN 978-1-4729-0091-3.
- The Noble Liar. Biteback Publishing Limited. 2018. ISBN 978-1-7859-0349-6.
