= Roger Bisby =

British journalist and presenter

- Bisby in Colchester (June 2008)
- Born: 16 November 1952 (age 73); City of London, UK
- Occupations: Journalist, TV presenter, Radio personality
- Years active: 1978–present
- Known for: Watchdog (BBC), Rogue Traders (BBC) and Professional Builder Magazine
- Height: 5 ft 11 in (180 cm)
- Spouse: Jill Bisby (m. 1975)
- Children: 4
- Parent(s): Charles Yates Bisby & Jean Hazel Bisby
- Website: www.skill-builder.uk

Roger Lawrence Bisby (born 16 November 1952) is an English television presenter, journalist and plumber, known for his YouTube channel Skill Builder and his expertise in the British building industry. He was the building expert on the long-running British consumer affairs television series Watchdog and then later Rogue Traders, both for the BBC.

== Biography ==
Born in the City of London, one of six children to opera singer Charles Yates Bisby and Jean Hazel Bisby, he initially entered the building industry as an apprentice plumber. He went on to train as a college lecturer, and has also run his own building company for nearly 30 years.

== Media career ==
In the last 30 years, Bisby has had a media career in many different areas. He has written articles and reviews for magazines and newspapers, had a series of DIY books published, appeared in television programmes, hosted radio shows, and more recently he has written a blog and started podcasting.

=== Publishing ===
Bisby entered journalism after sending an unsolicited article to a local paper as a PR exercise for his building company. Bisby worked on several building trade publications for Hamerville Publishing including Professional Builder magazine (for which he has been Products Editor for 16 years), Professional Electrician, Professional Heating and Plumbing Installer, and Professional Housebuilder and Property Developer. He has now left the print medium to concentrate on video production.

Published books include:

- Marshall Cavendish DIY guides
- Reader's Digest DIY Encyclopaedia
- Fix It DIY
- Here’s How
- The Knack
- Plumbing and Central Heating, Hamlyn Practical DIY Guides
- B&Q Best Way To Do It series

=== Radio ===
Bisby was the expert on LBC's Fix It Phone In which remained one of their most popular shows throughout its 15 years of broadcast. Bisby has also made guest appearances on Talksport, local BBC Radio and Capital FM.Radio 4 and Radio 2

=== Television ===
His television work includes appearances as the resident expert on The Terrace (BBC), Watchdog (BBC), Rogue Traders (BBC) and Dirty Tricks of the Tradesmen (BBC).

Television appearances:

- This Morning with Richard and Judy (ITV) - DIY Phone In
- Good Morning with Anne and Nick (ITV) - DIY projects
- Granada Television - DIY programmes
- Watchdog (BBC) - resident building expert
- Rogue Traders (BBC) - resident plumbing and heating expert
- House of Horrors (ITV) - resident building expert
- The Terrace (BBC) - resident building expert
- BBC News - building industry pundit
- Sky News - plumbing and heating expert
- Dirty Tricks of the Tradesmen (BBC) - acting rogue tradesman

=== Corporate ===
Since 1992, Bisby has been involved in the production of corporate media as a writer, voiceover artist, presenter, advisor and producer. Corporate work:

- Worcester Bosch Group - Energy House, Boiler Installation Guides and Guide to Energy Efficiency
- Wedi - Tile Backer and Fundo
- Stanley Tools - Range Overview
- Jeyes - Cleaning up in the Garden
- Marshalls Paving - Range Guide
- Alpha Tape - Alfa Tape Live Demonstration
- Titan - Installing the Ecosafe
- NuHeat Underfloor Heating - Installation Guide
- DeWalt Powertools - Range Overview
- Bosch Power tools - Getting the Job Done

=== Internet ===
More recently, Bisby has moved into New Media with his Self Build and DIY website and YouTube Channel Skill Builder, which he co-developed with Colchester-based production company Motion.

== Personal life ==
Bisby enjoys cycling (at the age of 13 he cycled around Britain), travel, running and rock climbing. He also gets involved in environmental clean-ups.
