= Knowsley Hall =

Stately home near Liverpool, England

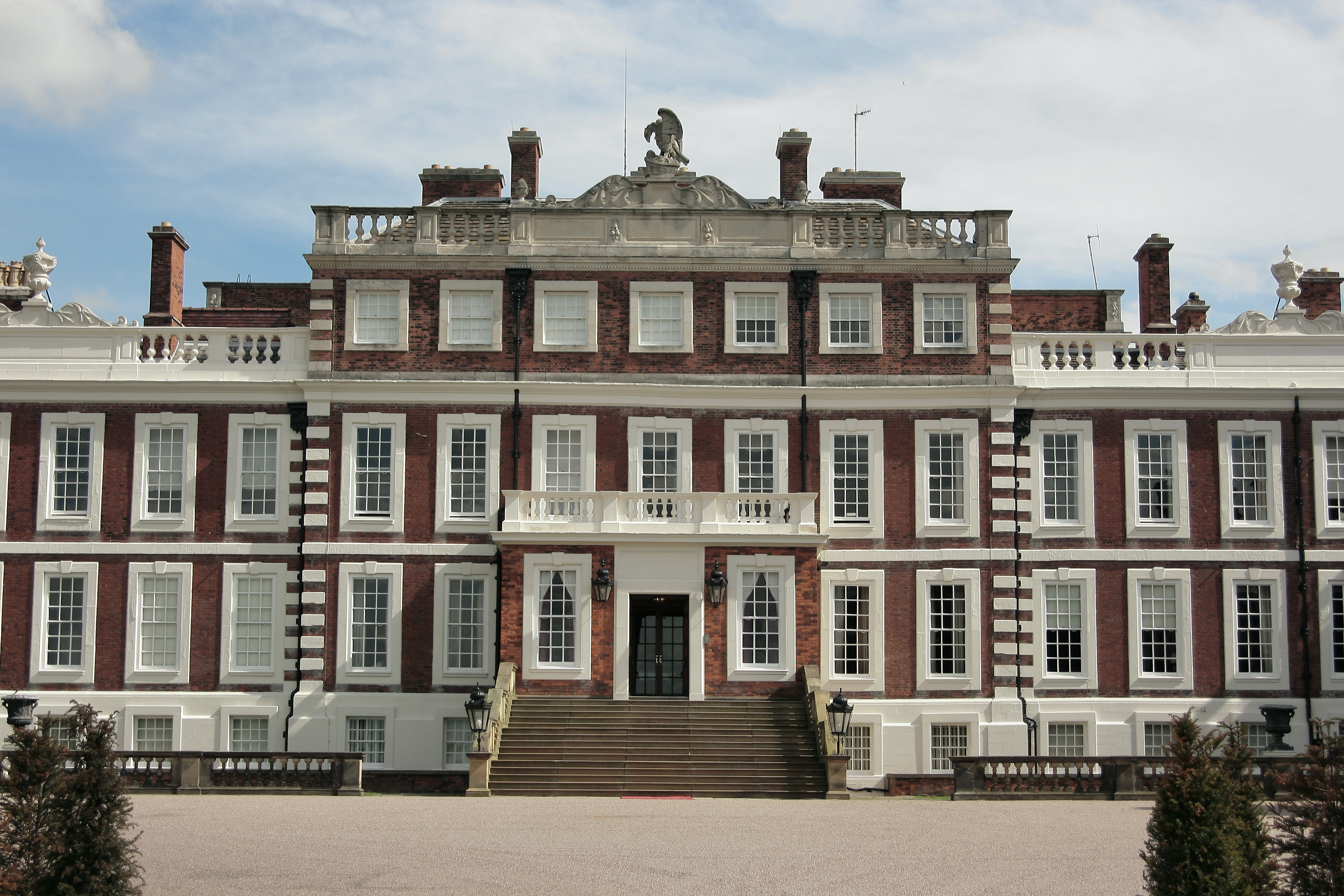
- Knowsley Hall

- Location within Merseyside

General information
- Location: Near Liverpool, Merseyside, England
- Coordinates: 53°26′17″N 02°50′15″W
- Client: Earls of Derby

Design and construction
- Architects: John Foster, William Burn, W. H. Romaine-Walker, Claud Phillimore
- Designations

Listed Building – Grade II*
- Official name: Knowsley Hall
- Designated: 9 June 1952
- Reference no.: 1253241

Knowsley Hall is a stately home near Liverpool in the Metropolitan Borough of Knowsley, Merseyside, England. It is the ancestral home of the Stanley family, the Earls of Derby. The hall is surrounded by 2,500 acres (10 km^{2}) of parkland, which contains Knowsley Safari Park. Since 1953, it has been designated a Grade II* listed building.

== History ==
Originally Knowsley was a medieval hunting lodge in the estate of Lathom House. It was inherited by the 10th Earl in 1702 who developed the lodge into a large house. A dairy (since demolished) was designed by Robert Adam, 1776–77. The house was given Gothic castellations and extended further in about 1820 to designs by John Foster, William Burn (who provided a boathouse and bridges in the park) and other architects. In the early 20th century it was "tidied up" by W. H. Romaine-Walker for the 17th Earl. After the Second World War, the buildings were considerably reduced by Claud Phillimore, and ceased to be lived in by the family. A smaller – but still substantial – family residence was built in the park.

=== 1952 Shootings ===
On the evening of 9 October 1952, Harold Winstanley, a 19-year-old trainee footman at the house, shot his employer, Lady Derby, and three colleagues, two of whom died: the butler, William Stallard, and the under-butler, Douglas Stuart.

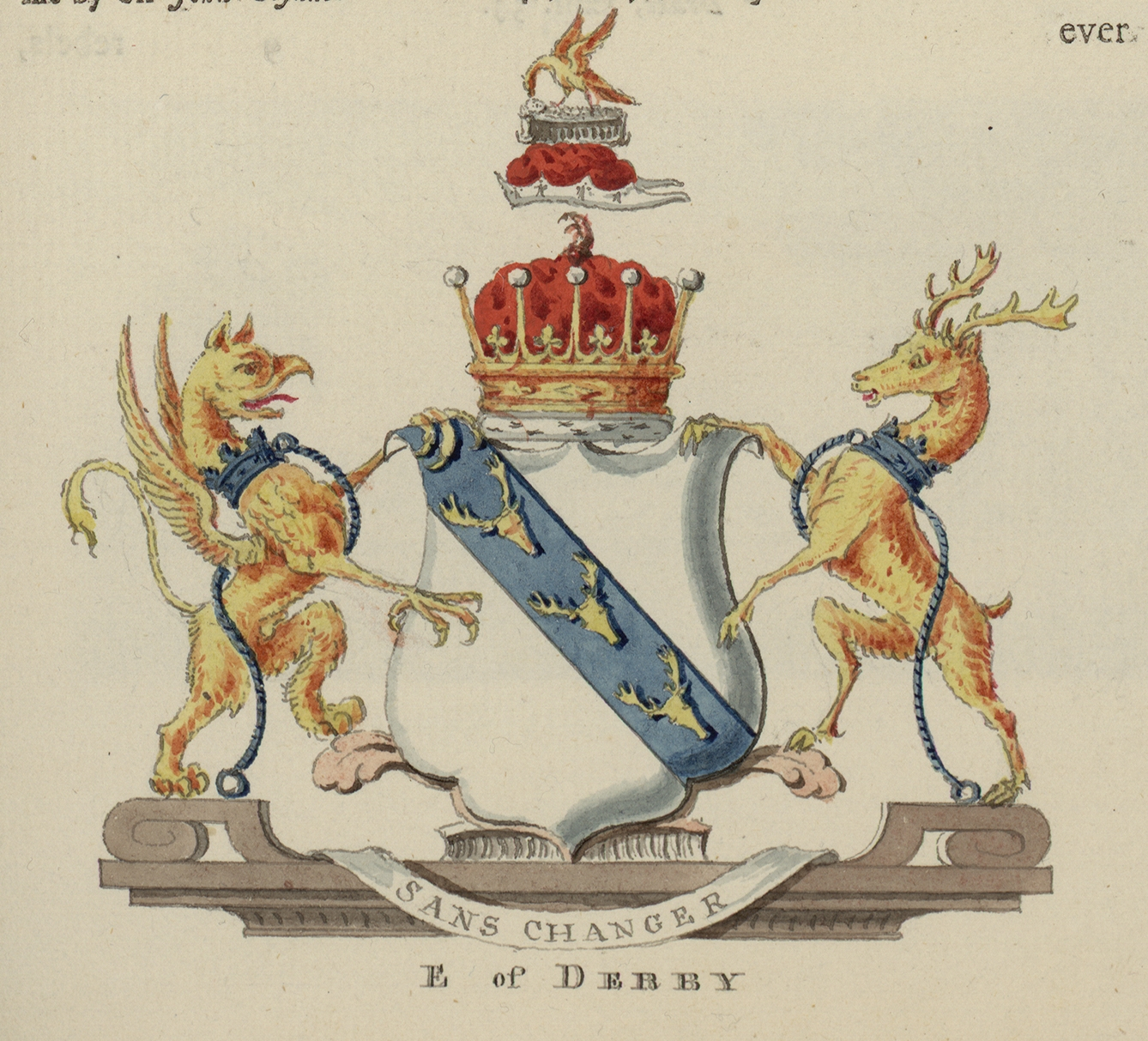
Arms of the Earl of Derby.

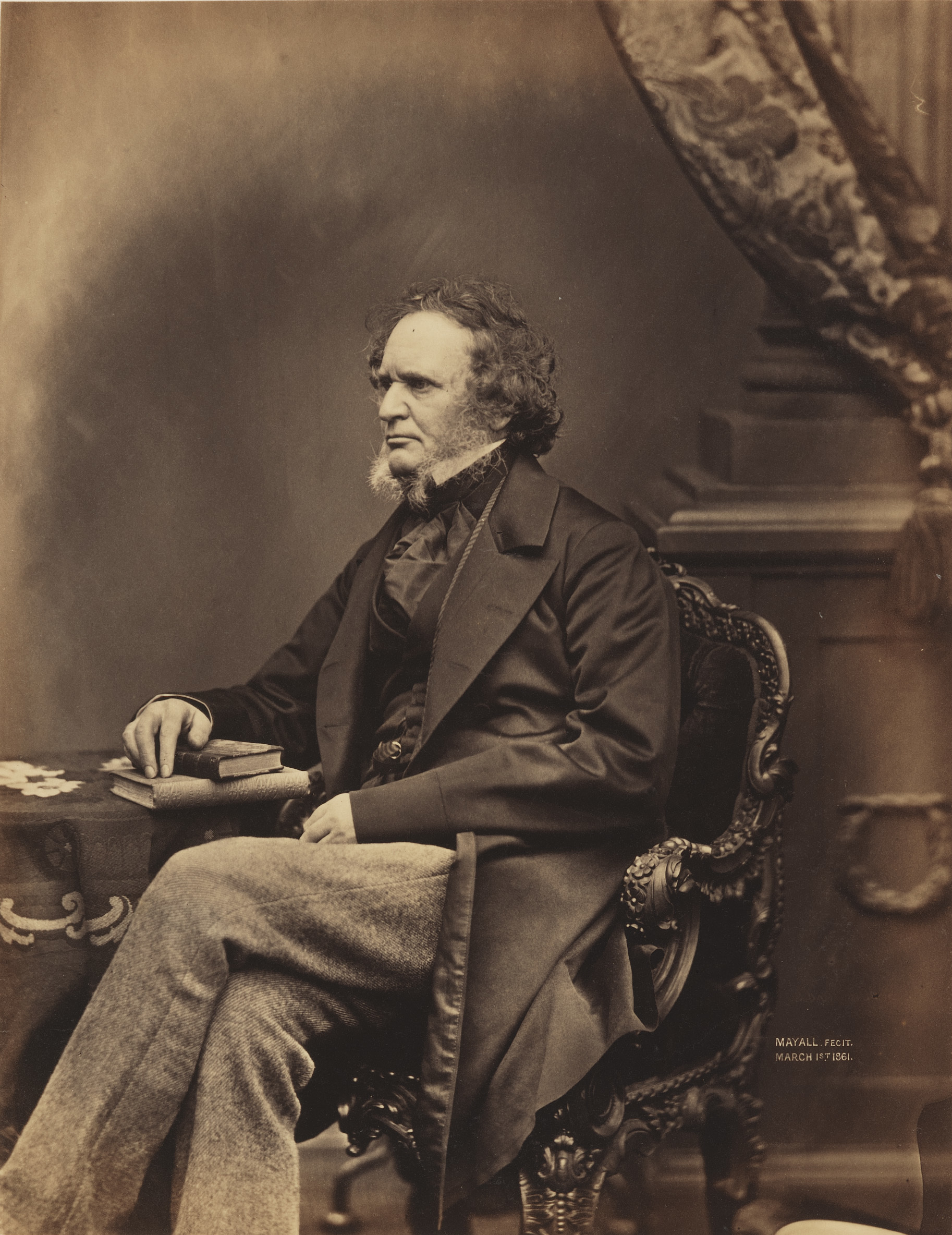
Edward Stanley, 14th Earl of Derby, became Prime Minister three times.

== Earls of Derby ==
Thomas Stanley was rewarded with the title of Earl Derby in 1485 by Henry VII as a reward for his support at the Battle of Bosworth Field which led to Henry's gaining the crown. The title was taken from the West Derby Hundred, a division of Lancashire in the South of the county (and not from the city of Derby). In 1495 Thomas entertained Henry VII at Lathom House and at Knowsley, which was then still a hunting lodge. Thomas, the second Earl, fought with Henry VIII at the Battle of the Spurs in 1513. Ferdinando, the fifth Earl, was a poet and a patron of writers, including William Shakespeare. He held the position of Earl for only one year before dying from arsenic poisoning. James, seventh Earl, was involved in the Civil War as a Royalist supporter of Charles I. Charlotte, his wife, withstood a siege at Lathom Hall for ten weeks in 1644. James fought with Charles I at the Battle of Worcester, was taken prisoner and beheaded at Bolton. He became known as the "Martyr Earl". The massive rebuilding of Knowsley in the early 18th century was carried out by James, the tenth Earl who had become wealthy through his marriage. Edward, the twelfth Earl had a great interest in horseracing and founded the Derby and the Oaks horseraces. He created the State Dining Room for the visit of George IV in 1820–21. In the grounds of Knowsley he maintained a menagerie which contained 94 different species of mammals and 318 species of birds, many of which were rare and valuable. Edward, the 13th Earl created a large library of works relating to natural history and was a champion of Edward Lear, whom he commissioned to paint animals from the menagerie.

Edward, the 14th Earl was a politician who became Prime Minister three times. He was responsible for steering the Slavery Abolition Act through Parliament and in his third administration the Second Reform Bill was passed. The political tradition was maintained by Frederick, the 16th Earl who became President of the Board of Trade and later was appointed Governor General of Canada. While in Canada he presented the Stanley Cup, the country's premier trophy for ice hockey. Also a politician, Edward George Villiers, the 17th Earl, was Secretary of State for War for two periods, first during the First World War and again from 1922 to 1924. Between these periods he was Ambassador to France. He was also interested in horseracing, winning the Derby three times and owning the successful stallion Hyperion. He was responsible for the major alterations to the house by Romaine-Walker. Edward John, the 18th Earl was awarded the Military Cross in the Second World War, and during 1953–54 he reduced the hall to a more manageable size, remodelled by architect Claud Phillimore, 4th Baron Phillimore; an entire wing of the house and a library were demolished, reducing the footprint by a third. He founded Knowsley Safari Park in 1971. Restoration of the hall has been continued by Edward Richard William, the 19th and current Earl and his wife, Caroline Emma Neville, daughter of the 10th Lord Braybrooke. The family do not live in the hall but in the New House in the grounds near the hall.

== Architecture ==
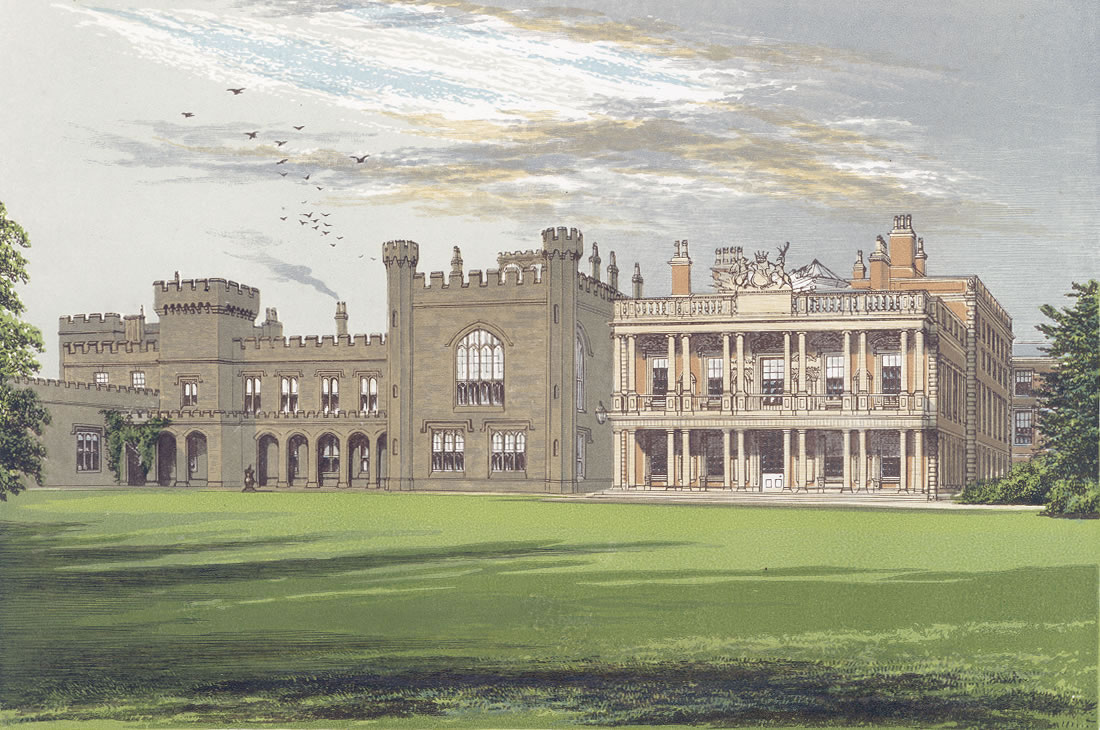
The southern façade of Knowsley Hall circa 1880 showing the Gothicised south wing to the left and the loggia at the end of the east wing on the right

=== External ===
The house consists of a long wing running north–south dating originally from the 1720s to 1737 (the east wing) and at right angles to the west is the south wing, dating originally from around 1495. At the west end of this wing is a detached structure, the Dynamo Tower. The east wing is Georgian in style, built in red brick with stone dressings. The south wing and Dynamo Tower are built in ashlar red sandstone. The oldest part of the south wing is known as the Royal Lodging. On its north side, facing the courtyard, are two round turrets with conical roofs. This face has nine bays with tall sash windows which are divided into groups of three by the towers.

The west side of the east wing, which faces the courtyard, has a total of 19 bays, with seven bays in a central section and six bays on each side. It consists of two storeys over a basement with an attic storey over the middle section. Above the central section is a pediment on the summit of which is sculpture of the eagle and child (the Stanley emblem). The east face of the east wing is particularly long. At the north end are four bays in two storeys; the centre is of nine bays in 2½ storeys; and at the south end are 16 bays, also in 2½ storeys but one storey lower because the land falls away to the south. At the south end of the east wing is a "handsome" two-storey, five-bay stone "portico or loggia" with paired Doric columns on the lower storey and paired fluted Ionic columns above. The east wing then jumps back with six bays facing west until it joins the south wing.

=== Internal ===
This section describes mainly the rooms which are normally open to the public. The Entrance Hall is panelled in carved oak and is hung with early 18th-century paintings of the house and the park. The Grand Staircase has a collection of oil paintings on leather. The morning room is a light family room overlooking the gardens and parkland. The Breakfast Room has pale blue panels with paintings, one of which is a portrait of Charlotte, wife of the 7th Earl. The Walnut Drawing-Room contains a number of portraits, including one of the second wife of the 12th Earl, the actress Elizabeth Farren. The library contains a collection of books on natural history brought together by the 13th Earl. The Stucco Room, decorated in Rococo style, was created in the 18th century to link the Royal Lodging with the rest of the house is now a ballroom with a sprung floor. The State Dining Room is hung with portraits of family members. The room was designed by Foster to look like a great hall with doors 30 feet (9 m) high and contains two Gothic fireplaces and an ormolu chandelier. It was reworked in 1890, adding a bay window, a carved dado and a roof consisting of a large rectangular lantern supported on brackets which is glazed round its sides. The hall now measures 53 by 37 feet (16 by 11 m) and is 50 feet (15 m) high.

== Parkland ==
This consists of an area of approximately 2,500 acres (10 km^{2}) surrounded by a stone wall 9 1/2 miles (15 km) long. It has been registered by English Heritage at Grade II. The park was landscaped in the 1770s by "Capability" Brown, who flooded a 62 acres (25 ha) lake to feed the water-gardens around the hall. The southeast section of the park was made into a safari park in 1971. To the east and northeast of the hall is a chain of lakes, White Man's Dam, the Octagon Pond and the Home Pond. The Octagon was built as a summer house in 1755 and designed by Robert Adam.

The park contains a number of buildings. These include the New House which was built for the 18th Earl and his family, by Phillimore in 1963 in Neo-Georgian style, the stables to the north of the hall which were designed by William Burn in the 1840s, the boathouse of 1837, also by William Burn, the Nest, Home Farm, and a number of lodges.

The parkland also contains the highest point in Knowsley Unitary Authority, 330 ft (100 m) above sea level, at SJ 456 943.

== Present use ==
Apart from the Safari Park being a tourist attraction, the hall and its grounds are used for a number of purposes. The hall can be booked for conferences and corporate events, and for private events. It is licensed for weddings. Events are held in the grounds to raise money for local charities.

Knowsley Hall was the filming location of the Davenport family estate (Fackham Hall) in the 2025 parody film Fackham Hall.

== See also ==
- Grade II* listed buildings in Merseyside
- Listed buildings in Knowsley, Merseyside
- Knowsley Hall shootings
