= Anne Calthorpe, Countess of Sussex =

Anne Calthorpe
- Countess of Sussex; Baroness FitzWalter; Viscountess FitzWalter
- Born: Unknown; Norfolk, England
- Died: Between 22 August 1579 and 28 March 1582
- Spouses: Henry Radcliffe, 2nd Earl of Sussex; Andrew Wyse
- Issue: Egremont Radcliffe; Maud Radcliffe; Frances Radcliffe; Elizabeth Wyse; Anthony Wyse
- Father: Sir Philip Calthorpe
- Mother: Jane Blennerhassett
- Occupation: Lady-in-waiting

Anne Calthorpe, Countess of Sussex (died between 22 August 1579 and 28 March 1582) was an English courtier. She was the second wife of Henry Radcliffe, 2nd Earl of Sussex, who divorced her in 1555 on the grounds of her alleged bigamous marriage to Sir Edmund Knyvet, and her "unnatural and unkind" character.

She served as a lady-in-waiting in the household of Queen Consort Katherine Parr, the sixth wife of King Henry VIII, and shared her Reformed beliefs. She was implicated in the heresy of Anne Askew. In 1552, she was sent to the Tower of London for having practised sorcery and having made "treasonous prophecies".

== Family ==
Anne was the daughter of Sir Philip Calthorpe of Burnham Thorpe, Norfolk and his second wife, Jane Blennerhassett. Anne had an older half-brother Sir Philip Calthorpe who married Amata Boleyn, paternal aunt of Queen Anne Boleyn. An aunt, Agnes Calthorpe, had thirdly been married as his first wife to Charles Knyvett (died 1528), the great-uncle of Anne's alleged bigamous husband Sir Edmund.

== First Marriage ==
Sometime before 21 November 1538, she married as his second wife, Henry Radcliffe, heir to the earldom of Sussex, whose wife, Elizabeth Howard had died in 1537. He was a second cousin of King Henry VIII of England as they shared Richard Woodville, 1st Earl Rivers and Jacquetta of Luxembourg as great-grandparents.

Together Henry and Anne had three children:

- Egremont Radcliffe (died 1578); he took part in the Rising of the North; after fleeing to the Continent, he was executed at Namur after being accused of attempting to poison John of Austria.
- Lady Maud Radcliffe (died at an early age)
- Lady Frances Radcliffe (died 1602); married Sir Thomas Mildmay, by whom she had issue. The FitzWalter barony ultimately passed to her descendants.

Anne had two stepsons, Thomas and Henry from her husband's first marriage.

On 27 November 1542, her husband succeeded as the 2nd Earl of Sussex, and from that date onward, she was styled Countess of Sussex. He also became the 11th Baron of FitzWalter, and the 2nd Viscount FitzWalter. In 1543, she went to court as a lady-in-waiting to the Queen, whose Reformed beliefs she shared. She was one of the Queen's ladies personally named by Anne Askew's interrogators. She was questioned by a commission for "errors in scripture". Her marriage to Radcliffe was not successful as they differed on religious issues. Between 1547 and 1549, they separated after he expelled her from their home, accusing her of having entered into a bigamous marriage with Sir Edmund Knyvet. In a letter written by Anne to her mother, she alleged that Radcliffe had thrown her out of his house without "money, men, women, or meat, and no more than two velvet gowns".

== Imprisonment and divorce ==
In September 1552, Anne was sent to the Tower of London for having practised sorcery and having made "treasonous prophecies". She was released five and a half months later. Following the accession of Mary I to the English throne, Anne fled to the Continent to avoid persecution for her Protestant beliefs. In her absence, Radcliffe had a Bill introduced in Parliament against the "adulterous living of the late Countess of Sussex". It didn't pass. He also attempted to bastardise their children with another Parliamentary Bill, but this also failed to pass despite having been read three times in the House of Commons of England.

In 1555, he tried again with yet another Bill, this time to prevent her from enjoying her dowry or jointure rights which did pass; however, he no longer sought to bastardise her children. He described Anne as having been "unnatural and unkind". They divorced on 13 November 1555.

== Return to England ==
Shortly after Radcliffe's death in February 1557, she returned to England. In his will, Radcliffe had styled her as an "unkind wife". By April of that same year she was a prisoner in the Fleet. The following year, a Bill of Parliament settled the matter of her jointure, and by June 1559 she had married Andrew Wyse, a former Royal Officer in Ireland.

By her second husband, Anne bore two more children:

- Elizabeth Wyse (baptised 2 January 1560); married Alexander Fitton on 31 October 1578.
- Anthony Wyse

== Last years and death ==
Anne, her husband and their children returned to Ireland in 1564. She died sometime between 22 August 1579 and 28 March 1582.
