= Lady Frances Radclyffe =

Lady Frances Radclyffe (died 1602) was an English noblewoman, who early in the reign of Queen Elizabeth I became one of her Maids of Honour. It was at the royal court when Frances attracted the attention of visiting Irish chieftain Shane O'Neill, who was searching for a "proper English wife" and made her a proposal of matrimony, which she refused to consider. She later married Sir Thomas Mildmay, by whom she had two sons.

== Family ==
Lady Frances was born on an unknown date, the youngest daughter of Henry Radclyffe, 2nd Earl of Sussex by his second wife, Anne Calthorpe, a lady-in-waiting to Queen consort Katherine Parr. Frances had a brother, Egremont, and a sister, Maud who died at a young age. She also had two elder half-brothers Thomas Radclyffe, 3rd Earl of Sussex and Henry Radclyffe, 4th Earl of Sussex, by her father's first marriage to Elizabeth Howard, and two younger siblings by her mother's remarriage to Andrew Wyse.

Frances's childhood was unsettled. When she was an infant, her father had thrown her mother out of the house for allegedly having entered into a bigamous marriage with Sir Edmund Knyvet. In September 1552, her mother was sent to the Tower of London for practising sorcery, and upon the accession of Queen Mary I, Anne, who was a Protestant fled to the Continent to avoid the Marian persecutions. It was during Anne's absence that Frances's father divorced her mother and attempted, albeit unsuccessfully, to have Parliament bastardise both her and Egremont. There is the possibility that Sir Edmund Knyvet was indeed Frances's natural father.

== Shane O'Neill ==
Early in the reign of Queen Elizabeth I, Frances went to court where she served the new Queen as one of her maids-of-honour. It was in this capacity that she attracted the attention of Shane O'Neill, the chief of the Irish clan of O'Neill, who arrived in London in January 1562 to negotiate with the Queen for his late father's title of Earl of Tyrone.

O'Neill was a violent and ambitious man, having murdered many of his rivals. He was twice-divorced and kept his former father-in-law's wife as a mistress. He asked the Queen to procure for him a "proper English wife", and according to Violet Wilson's Queen Elizabeth's Maids of Honor and Ladies of the Privy Chamber, he specifically wished to marry Lady Frances. His proposal of matrimony was refused.

Shortly afterwards, when Frances visited her half-brother Thomas, 3rd Earl of Sussex in Ireland, where he served as lord lieutenant, O'Neill unsuccessfully renewed his courtship of her. His pursuit of Frances only served to increase the Earl's enmity towards O'Neill, and had tried to assassinate him by the means of poison. Frances returned to England, and her erstwhile suitor eventually married his mistress.

== Marriage and death ==
In July 1566, Frances married Sir Thomas Mildmay (died 1608). She died in 1602, by her husband having two sons:

- Sir Thomas Mildmay, 1st Baronet, died in 1625/26, unmarried and childless.
- Sir Henry Mildmay (c. 1585 – 1654), married Elizabeth Darcy, by whom he had issue. In 1641, a dozen years after the childless death of his maternal first cousin Robert Radclyffe, 5th Earl of Sussex, he put forward a claim to be rightful Baron FitzWalter. No action was taken at the time, but the claim was renewed by his grandson Benjamin and accepted in 1669, causing Sir Henry to be viewed retrospectively as de jure Baron FitzWalter.
