= Henry Radclyffe, 2nd Earl of Sussex =

Earl of Sussex

Henry Radclyffe, 2nd Earl of Sussex KG
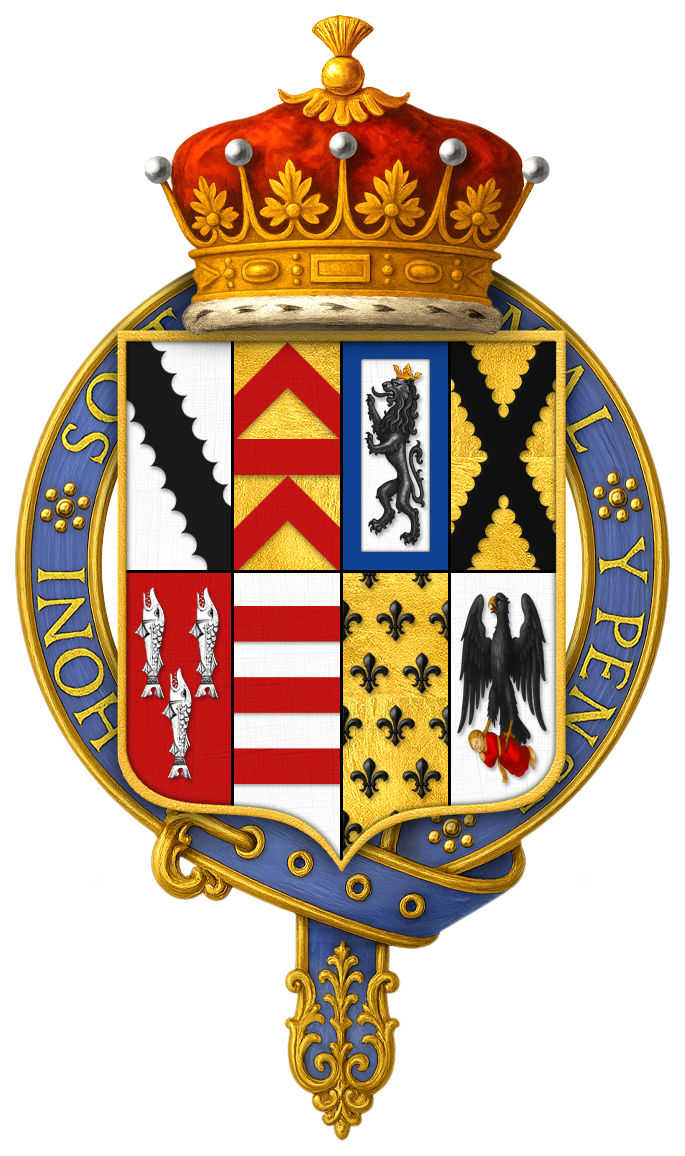
- Arms of Sir Henry Radclyffe, 2nd Earl of Sussex
- Born: 1507
- Died: 17 February 1557 (aged 49–50); Channel Row, Westminster
- Spouses: Elizabeth Howard; Anne Calthorpe
- Issue: Thomas Radclyffe, 3rd Earl of Sussex; Henry Radclyffe, 4th Earl of Sussex; Egremont Radclyffe; Lady Maud Radcliffe; Lady Frances Radclyffe
- Father: Robert Radclyffe, 1st Earl of Sussex
- Mother: Lady Elizabeth Stafford

Henry Radclyffe, 2nd Earl of Sussex, KG (also spelt "Radcliffe") (1507 – 17 February 1557) was a son of Robert Radclyffe, 1st Earl of Sussex and his wife Elizabeth Stafford, Countess of Sussex.

== Marriages and children ==
He was first married to Elizabeth Howard, a daughter of Thomas Howard, 2nd Duke of Norfolk and his second wife Agnes Tilney. They had two sons:

- Thomas Radclyffe, 3rd Earl of Sussex (c. 1525 – 9 June 1583).
- Henry Radclyffe, 4th Earl of Sussex (c. 1532–1593).

The Complete Peerage gives the date of death for his first wife as 18 September 1534. Burke's Peerage agrees on the date but changes the year to 1537. Either way, Henry would not remain a widower for long.

He married secondly Anne Calthorpe. The marriage resulted in a divorce or annulment in 1555, but they had three known children:

- Egremont Radclyffe (died 1578). He took part in the Rising of the North but escaped to Continental Europe after its failure. He was executed in Namur, accused of attempting to poison John of Austria. John is believed to have died of typhus.
- Lady Maud Radcliffe (died at an early age)
- Lady Frances Radclyffe (died 1602). Married Sir Thomas Mildmay, by whom she had two sons.

== Earl ==
On 27 November 1542, his father died and Henry succeeded him as Earl of Sussex.

The Vita Mariae Angliae reginae written by Robert Wingfield records that, during the 1553 succession crisis, Radclyffe's son Henry was captured by Sir John Huddleston and this brought Henry to visit Lady Mary Tudor at Framlingham Castle (near his home at Attleborough), where he was persuaded to support her claim to the throne and command a company of soldiers.

After she became queen, Mary I (who was also Radclyffe's second cousin) created him a Knight of the Garter in 1554, alongside the later Philip II of Spain, Emmanuel Philibert, Duke of Savoy and William Howard, 1st Baron Howard of Effingham.

He died on 17 February 1557 at Channel Row, Westminster (now known as Canon Row).

Peerage of England
Preceded by Robert Radclyffe	Earl of Sussex; 1542–1557	Succeeded by Thomas Radclyffe
Preceded by Robert Radclyffe	Baron FitzWalter (descended by acceleration); 1542–1553	Succeeded by Thomas Radclyffe
