= Listed buildings in Brantham =

Civil Parish in Suffolk, England

Brantham is a village and civil parish in the Babergh District of Suffolk, England. It contains ten listed buildings that are recorded in the National Heritage List for England. Of these one is grade II* and nine are grade II.

This list is based on the information retrieved online from Historic England.

== Key ==
Grade	Criteria
I	Buildings that are of exceptional interest
II*	Particularly important buildings of more than special interest
II	Buildings that are of special interest

== Listing ==
Name	Grade	Location	Type	Completed (Note: The date given is the date used by Historic England as significant for the initial building or that of an important part in the structure's description.)	Date designated	Grid ref. (Note: The grid reference is based on the British national grid reference system, sometimes known as OSGB36, used by the Ordnance Survey.) Geo-coordinates	Notes	Entry number (Note: The "List Entry Number" is a unique number assigned to each listed building and scheduled monument by Historic England.)	Image	Wikidata
War Memorial in Brantham Industrial Estate	II				21 February 2011	TM1059633011; 51°57′20″N 1°03′49″E		1396568	Upload Photo	Q26675345
Braham Hall	II	Brantham Hill			30 October 1990	TM0997333540; 51°57′38″N 1°03′17″E		1193926	Upload Photo	Q26488566
The Thatched Cottage	II	Brantham Hill			30 October 1990	TM1045533611; 51°57′40″N 1°03′42″E		1033429	Upload Photo	Q26284911
Cattawade Bridge	II	Cattawade Street	bridge		30 October 1990	TM1017733041; 51°57′22″N 1°03′27″E		1033430	Cattawade Bridge More images	Q26284912
The Crown Public House	II	Cattawade Street	pub		30 October 1990	TM1020533098; 51°57′24″N 1°03′28″E		1193942	The Crown Public House More images	Q26488581
Church of St Michael and All Angels	II*	Church Lane	church building		22 February 1955	TM1121634195; 51°57′58″N 1°04′24″E		1033431	Church of St Michael and All Angels More images	Q17532665
Lychgate Approximately 30 Metres North of Church of St Michael and All Angels	II	Church Lane			16 March 1972	TM1119934223; 51°57′59″N 1°04′23″E		1285892	Upload Photo	Q26574549
Brantham Hall	II	Ipswich Road, The Chase			22 February 1955	TM1195533915; 51°57′48″N 1°05′02″E		1033432	Upload Photo	Q26284913
Hill Cottage Number 9 and Adjoining Rose Cottage	II	Ipswich Road			30 October 1990	TM1229634544; 51°58′08″N 1°05′21″E		1194303	Upload Photo	Q26488930
The Bull Inn	II	Ipswich Road	inn		22 February 1955	TM1227634503; 51°58′06″N 1°05′20″E		1033433	The Bull Inn More images	Q26284914

== See also ==
- Grade I listed buildings in Suffolk
- Grade II* listed buildings in Suffolk

== Sources ==
- Bettely, James; Pevsner, Nikolaus (2015) [1961], Suffolk: West, The Buildings of England, New Haven and London: Yale University Press, ISBN 978-0-300-19655-9
