= William Gurdon =

William Gurdon may refer to:

- William Gurdon (cricketer) (1804–1884), English judge and cricketer
- William Brampton Gurdon (1840–1911), British civil servant and politician
