= Humphrey Wingfield =

English politician (died 1545)

Sir Humphrey Wingfield (died 1545) was an English lawyer and Speaker of the House of Commons of England between 1533 and 1536.

== Early life ==
He was the twelfth son of Sir John Wingfield of Letheringham, Suffolk, by Elizabeth, daughter of Sir John FitzLewis of West Horndon, Essex; Sir Richard Wingfield (1469–1525) and Sir Robert Wingfield were his brothers. Humphrey was educated at Gray's Inn, where he was elected Lent Reader in 1517. He had been on the commission of the peace both for Essex and Suffolk since 1509 at least.

== Career ==
Charles Brandon, 1st Duke of Suffolk was a cousin of the Wingfields, Humphrey being one of his trustees. and probably through his influence Wingfield was introduced at court. In 1515 he was appointed chamberlain to Suffolk's wife Mary Tudor, Queen of France, and was apparently resident in her house. On 28 May 1517 he was nominated upon the royal commission for inquiring into illegal inclosures in Suffolk. He appears to have acted in 1518, together with his eldest brother, Sir John Wingfield, as a financial agent between the government and the Duke of Suffolk.

On 6 November 1520 Wingfield was chosen High Sheriff of Norfolk and Suffolk, and on 14 November was appointed a commissioner of gaol delivery for Essex. In 1523 and 1524 he was a commissioner of subsidy for Suffolk and for the town of Ipswich and also MP for Ipswich, his main seat being at Brantham nearby. On 26 June 1525 he was appointed a commissioner of assize for Suffolk, On 5 February 1526 he was a legal member of the king's council. He worked with Thomas Wolsey, as both were related to each other via Wolsey's mother, and he took an active part in the establishment of the "Cardinal's College" at Ipswich in September 1528. On 11 June 1529 he was nominated by Wolsey one of a commission of twenty-one lawyers presided over by John Taylor to hear cases in chancery, and on the following 3 November he was returned to parliament for Great Yarmouth.

In 1530 the fall of Wolsey brought with it the forfeiture of his college at Ipswich, and Wingfield was consulted as counsel, with a view to securing the exemption of the college from the penalties of Wolsey's praemunire. On the other hand, he was nominated by the crown on 14 July 1530 a commissioner to inquire into Wolsey's possessions in Suffolk. In this capacity he, sitting with three other commissioners at Woodbridge, Suffolk, returned a verdict on 19 September that the college and its lands were forfeited to the king. He was at the same time high steward of St. Mary Mettingham, another Suffolk college, and under-steward in Suffolk of the estates of St. Osyth, Essex.

On 9 February 1533 the commons presented Wingfield to the king as their speaker. According to Eustace Chapuys, the king knighted him on this occasion. He is styled 'Sir' in a petition of this year, and frequently afterwards; but according to the list in Walter Metcalfe's Book of Knights he was not dubbed before 1537. During his speakership were passed the acts severing the church of England from the Roman obedience and affirming the royal supremacy; Wingfield supported Henry's policy.

Parliament was dissolved on 4 April 1536. On the outbreak of the Pilgrimage of Grace in 1536 Wingfield was one of the Suffolk gentry upon whom the government relied for aid. He justified Thomas Cromwell's opinion of him by opposing the incitements of the friars and other disaffected ecclesiastics. He was nominated in 1536 a commissioner for the valuation of the lands and goods of religious houses in Norfolk and Suffolk. For these services he was rewarded by a grant in tail male, dated 29 June 1537, of the manors of Netherhall and Overhall in Dedham, Essex, and all the lands in Dedham belonging to the suppressed nunnery of Campsey, Suffolk, also of the manor of Crepinghall in Stutton, Suffolk, and all lands there belonging to the late priory of Colne Comitis (Earls Colne) in Essex. According to a letter written by him to Cromwell soon after this grant he had then lost half his estate by his wife's death. On 4 July 1538 he was nominated upon a special commission of oyer and terminer for treasons in six of the eastern counties. He was also commissioned to survey the defensive points of the coast when in 1539 there were apprehensions of an invasion. He was among the knights appointed to receive Anne of Cleves in January 1540. After the conviction of Henry Courtenay, 1st Marquess of Exeter he received a grant of a lease of his lands in Lalford Says, Ardelegh, Colchester, and Mile-End, in Essex and Suffolk. He was again returned to Parliament as the Member for Great Yarmouth in 1542.

Wingfield died on 23 October 1545.

== Family ==
Wingfield married between 1502 and 1512 Anne, daughter and heiress of Sir John Wiseman of Essex, and widow of Gregory Adgore, Edgore, or Edgar, serjeant-at-law. His son and heir, Robert, married Bridget, daughter of Sir Thomas Pargeter, knt., alderman and lord mayor of London in 1530. His daughter Anne married Sir Alexander Newton.

== Notes ==
Political offices
Preceded by Sir Thomas Audley	Speaker of the House of Commons; 1533-1536	Succeeded by Sir Richard Rich
