= Henry Radclyffe, 4th Earl of Sussex =

16th-century English peer

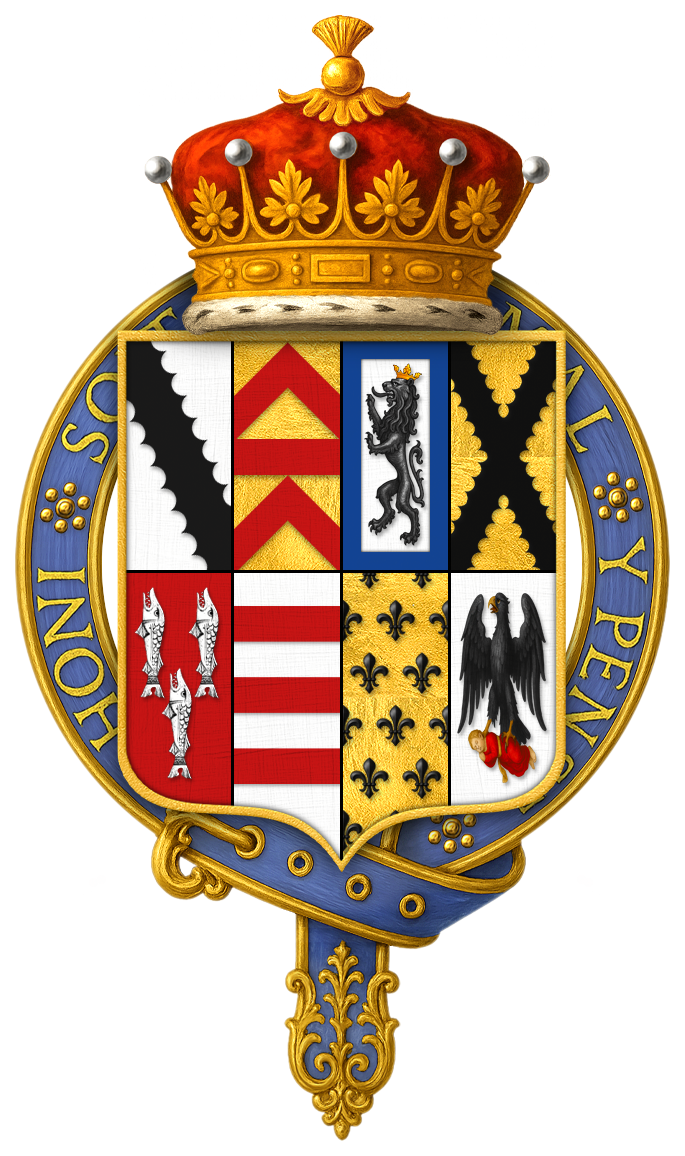
Quartered arms of Sir Henry Radclyffe, 4th Earl of Sussex, KG

Henry Radclyffe, 4th Earl of Sussex, KG (c. 1530 – 14 December 1593) was an English peer.

== Life ==
He was born in England to Henry Radclyffe, 2nd Earl of Sussex, and Elizabeth Howard.

The Vita Mariae Angliae reginae written by Robert Wingfield records that, during the 1553 succession crisis, while carrying papers to the Privy Council in London from his father, Henry was captured by Sir John Huddleston. This led his father to visit Lady Mary Tudor at Framlingham Castle, where he was persuaded to support her claim to the throne.

After Mary I was crowned, Henry was knighted by Henry FitzAlan, 19th Earl of Arundel, on 2 October 1553, and elected to parliament as member for Maldon in 1555 and Chichester in 1559.

In 1556, he went to Ireland, to support his elder brother Thomas Radclyffe, 3rd Earl of Sussex. There he was appointed a privy councillor in 1557, and commanded a band of horsemen. In 1558 he became lieutenant of Maryborough Fort, and was besieged there by the Irish under Donogh O'Conor. He sat in the Irish House of Commons as member for Carlingford in 1559, and two years later was nominated lieutenant of Leix and Offaly. He managed to keep the district quiet, but in 1564, when commissioners were sent from England to report on the condition of the Irish government, charges of corruption in dealing with funds appointed for the payment of the soldiers were brought against Radclyffe. He was ordered to refund at once £8,000, and on his refusal was committed to prison (January 1565). His release was ordered by the home government, and he left Ireland permanently soon afterwards. In 1577 he was granted some property there, in County Kilkenny and County Wexford.

In England, he had already been appointed constable for life of Porchester Castle, and lieutenant of Southbere Forest (14 June 1560). In 1571, when he was elected M.P. for Hampshire, he received the office of warden and captain of the town, castle, and isle of Portsmouth, and he was active in that capacity until his death. In 1572 he was elected MP for Portsmouth. He succeeded his brother as Earl of Sussex on 9 June 1583, finding the estate burdened with a debt to the crown. For the next decade, until his death, he was the patron of The Earl of Sussex's Men, who performed several of the early Shakespeare plays at The Rose (theatre) under Philip Henslowe, including Titus Andronicus and Richard III.

In August 1586, he was tracking down an alleged Catholic conspiracy at Portsmouth, and was watching suspicious vessels off the coast. During 1588, he was active in furnishing stores and gunpowder for the ships commissioned to resist the Spanish Armada, and as joint Lord Lieutenant of Hampshire he commanded 3944 men of the Hampshire Trained Bands ready to defend Southampton. For his services, he was made Knight of the Garter on 22 April 1589.

He died on 14 December 1593, and was buried at Boreham, Essex, beside his brother and his wife.

== Family ==
On 6 February 1549, he married Honora Pound daughter of Anthony Pound(e), of Drayton, Farlington, Hampshire. Henry and Honora had two children: a son Robert Radclyffe, 5th Earl of Sussex (12 June 1573 – 22 September 1629), first married to Bridget Morrison, from his second marriage to Frances Shute Meautys, a daughter Jane Radcliffe.

Peerage of England
Preceded by Thomas Radclyffe	Earl of Sussex; 1583–1593	Succeeded by Robert Radclyffe
