= Brantham TMD =

Unfinished train depot in Suffolk

Brantham / Harwich TMD
Location
- Location: (Note: The depot is now planned to be built on the outskirts of Harwich)

Characteristics
- Owner: St Francis Group
- Operator: Greater Anglia

Brantham TMD was a planned depot for Greater Anglia off the Great Eastern Main Line in Brantham. Construction was halted in April 2018 due to council concerns and in July 2019 planning permission was obtained for an alternative location between Dovercourt and Harwich International.

== History ==
In February 2017, Greater Anglia announced it would build a new depot on the site a former Imperial Chemical Industries factory in Brantham off the Great Eastern Main Line east of Manningtree station. Planned to open in 2018, it was to be the home depot for Greater Anglia's new fleet of Class 745 and Class 755 Stadler Flirts. It was being built by Taylor Woodrow. In April 2018 construction was halted after the council raised concerns about frequent train moves blocking a level crossing. In December 2018, Greater Anglia confirmed it had decided not to proceed with the depot.

In July 2019, Greater Anglia obtained planning permission from Tendring Council to construct the depot on the outskirts of Harwich between Dovercourt and Harwich International. The depot was set to provide joys for between eight and 12 engineers to support the Bombardier Aventra trains that are due to be introduced towards the end of 2019. Maintenance and servicing is expected to occur mostly overnight and the depot will be equipped with a wheel lathe to address flatspots.

As of January 2021, work on the site had not commenced and the company was not able to confirm when it would start, despite the new Aventra trains being set to be introduced on all lines by summer 2022.
