= Hampshire Trained Bands =

Part-time military force in the maritime county of Hampshire

- Active: 1572–1662
- Country: England
- Branch: Trained Bands
- Role: Infantry and Cavalry
- Engagements: Siege of Portsmouth

Commanders
- Notable commanders: Sir George Carey; William Paulet, 3rd Marquess of Winchester; Henry Radclyffe, 4th Earl of Sussex

The Hampshire Trained Bands were a part-time military force recruited from Hampshire and the Isle of Wight in Southern England. First organised in 1572 from earlier levies, they were periodically embodied for home defence and internal security, including the Spanish Armada campaign in 1588 and the Wars of the Three Kingdoms.

== Early history ==
The English militia was descended from the Anglo-Saxon Fyrd, the military force raised from the freemen of the shires under command of their Sheriff. The universal obligation to serve continued under the Norman and Plantagenet kings and was reorganised under the Assizes of Arms of 1181 and 1252, and again by the Statute of Winchester of 1285. The able-bodied men were equipped by their parishes and arrayed by the Hundreds into which each county was divided. The Isle of Wight (IoW) levies, organised into nine companies, had to repel French incursions on several occasions, such as 1341, 1377, 1418 and 1419. Those of the County of Southampton (Note: For a large part of its history Hampshire was formally known as the County of Southampton to distinguish it from Northamptonshire; today 'Southampton' refers only to the city.) were assembled in 1377 by Lord Arundel to drive French raiders out of the town of Southampton, which they had occupied.

King Henry VIII enforced these statutes in 1511, and in 1539 under threat of invasion he ordered a Great Muster of the militia of all the counties. In 1545 a French invasion fleet entered the Solent and invaded the Isle of Wight, being opposed by the Isle of Wight and Hampshire levies at the Battle of Bonchurch and at Bembridge. The levies fell back to the woods and hedgerows, and then counterattacked from the heights of Culver Down. Although these skirmishes were inconclusive, the French evacuated the island after the equally inconclusive naval Battle of the Solent.

== Hampshire Trained Bands ==
The legal basis of the militia was updated by two acts of 1557 covering musters (4 & 5 Ph. & M. c. 3) and the maintenance of horses and armour (4 & 5 Ph. & M. c. 2). The county militia was now under the Lord Lieutenant, assisted by the deputy lieutenants and justices of the peace (JPs). The entry into force of these acts in 1558 is seen as the starting date for the organised county militia in England. Although the militia obligation was universal, it was impractical to train and equip every able-bodied man, and in 1570 Hampshire was one of the counties instructed to make special arrangements for equipping and training arquebusiers. From 1572 the practice across the country was to select a proportion of men for the Trained bands, (TBs) who were mustered for regular training.

At that date the hundreds of Hampshire could supply 6891 able men, of which 628 were equipped with 'corslets' (armour, signifying pikemen), 1101 with firearms (arquebuses or calivers), 1590 with bows, 749 armoured with 'Almain rivets or coats of plate', and 3485 with bills. In 1572 the Marquess of Winchester drew up a defence plan for Hampshire: the TBs of 14 out of the 42 hundreds, together with those of Fareham and Havant, were dedicated to the defence of Portsmouth and its harbour. The rest of the coast was thinly held: the New Forest levy (303 men under a Captain and two 'petty captains') was to defend vulnerable landing places from Redbridge as far as Lymington, and those further west to Bournemouth were covered by the men of Christchurch Hundred (316 men similarly officered). Southampton, whose seaward approaches were well covered by artillery fortifications, would be guarded by its own town militia and some men drawn from the Mansbridge and New Forest hundreds.

The government aimed for 10 days' training a year, with a two-day national 'general muster' at Michaelmas, and two 'special musters' lasting four days for detailed training at Easter and Whitsun. In the early years of Queen Elizabeth I's reign the nationwide musters only occurred roughly every four years, and from 1578 the special musters were reduced to two days each. However, Sir George Carey, Governor of the Isle of Wight, ordered special musters of his companies in spring and summer to ensure that sick and dead men were replaced, and that training was kept up. When war broke out with Spain, training and equipping the TBs became a priority. From 1583 counties were organised into groups for training purposes, with emphasis on the invasion-threatened 'maritime' counties including Hampshire. In 1584 Hampshire was charged with providing 800 trained 'shot' (men with firearms), 200 bowmen and 500 corslets, and the numbers certified as being present almost exactly met these requirements. The 1572 defence plan was updated: different districts were made responsible for guarding certain parts of the coastline, while other villages in the west and north-west of the county were to send 2339 reinforcements to the Isle of Wight, recognised as the most likely place for an invasion. In 1587 Captain William Henworth was appointed Muster-Master for the county.

== Armada crisis ==
With invasion threatened in 1588, Sir John Norreys was appointed in April to oversee the defences of the maritime counties and the lords-lieutenant were instructed to carry out his orders in relation to rallying-points for the coast defenders if they were driven inland by invaders. By this time the Hampshire militia was divided into two contingents under joint lords-lieutenant: 4747 able men, of whom 4037 were 'furnished', under the Marquess of Winchester at Portsmouth, and 3944, of which 2678 were furnished, under the Earl of Sussex, Governor of Southampton. The men assigned to reinforce the Isle of Wight were to gather at Hurst Castle for the crossing by requisitioned boats. Those actually called out were 806 trained men and 1672 armed but untrained, together with 1660 unarmed pioneers, and 374 'petronels' (the petronel was an early cavalry firearm). The Isle of Wight had 1800 men, nearly two-thirds with firearms, bowmen only amounting to 109, with 116 pikemen and 470 halberdiers.

The Spanish Armada was spotted off the coast of South-West England on 30 July 1588 and the signal beacons were fired, calling out the TBs along the south coast and across the country. The Armada was engaged by the Royal Navy in a running fight up the English Channel. The Armada's orders were not to land in Southern England, but to sail to the Spanish Netherlands and pick up an army under the Duke of Parma to invade up the Thames Estuary, but a council of war among its officers decided to shelter east of the Isle of Wight and make contact with Parma before continuing. To those watching from the shore this had the appearance of preparations to land on the Isle of Wight or the Hampshire coast. The Royal Navy continued its attacks, and during this Battle of the Isle of Wight Carey offered to send some of his musketeers from the island to reinforce the English fleet. However, this was turned down by the Lord High Admiral, Lord Howard of Effingham, who had no intention of fighting boarding actions and considered that he had as many men as he needed to work his ships and heavy guns. Under continuous attacks and faced with contrary winds and currents, the Armada was unable to make its way into the Spithead anchorage off Portsmouth, and continued on its course. It failed to link with Parma's army, and was finally driven away into the North Sea by fireships and bad weather. The TBs along the coast could then be stood down.

In the 16th century little distinction was made between the militia and the troops levied by the counties for overseas expeditions, and between 1585 and 1602 Hampshire supplied 641 men for service in Ireland, 1400 for France and 525 for the Netherlands. However, the counties usually conscripted the unemployed and criminals rather than the Trained Bandsmen – in 1585 the Privy Council had ordered the impressment of able-bodied unemployed men, and the Queen ordered 'none of her trayned-bands to be pressed'. On one occasion Sir John Norreys complained that 100 of the pressed men had escaped on their way to the embarkation port, and the countryfolk were hiding them. Norreys blamed the Hampshire authorities for this state of affairs and suggested that as a punishment they should be made to levy 100 replacements, Hampshire being a populous county that could easily spare the men. Replacing the weapons issued to the levies from the militia armouries was a heavy cost on the counties. When Hampshire levied 900 men for service in Normandy in 1589, few of them had firearms.

In 1599 a fresh alarm brought orders that in the event of invasion the 'Southampton' TBs were to be reinforced by contingents from the Berkshire and Surrey TBs, while Hampden Paulet, one of the county's 'martial men' and formerly a captain in Flanders, would reinforce the Isle of Wight with 500 men from the Hampshire TBs. When the Hampshire TBs were mobilised to protect Portsmouth on 8 August Paulet reported that the men were slow to arrive, were poorly equipped and showed little enthusiasm. Nevertheless, the force had fully mobilised before it was stood down on 18 August.

== Stuart Reform ==
With the passing of the threat of invasion, the trained bands declined in the early 17th Century. Later, King Charles I attempted to reform them into a national force or 'Perfect Militia' answering to the king rather than local control. The Isle of Wight TBs in 1625 comprised 2020 men in 12 bands. The Southampton (Hampshire) Trained Bands of 1638 consisted of 4799 men armed with 2854 muskets and 1945 corslets (pikemen), together with 170 horsemen.

In November 1638, as the King's relationship with Scotland moved towards outright hostilities (the First Bishops' War), the English counties were ordered to muster their TBs and keep them in readiness. Once again, when an army was assembled in 1639 few of the men sent by the counties were actually trained bandsmen. When the Isle of Wight TBs were alerted in 1639 as a Spanish fleet cruised in the English Channel, they had few weapons because so much equipment had been sent to the King's army in the north.

For the Second Bishops' War in 1640 the County of Southampton was ordered to send 1300 trained bandsmen to Newcastle upon Tyne. The Hampshire authorities were unwilling to send their farm workers, instead impressing labourers, tradesmen and strangers. There were widespread disorders among the unwilling levies, and the Hampshire contingent was one of those affected.

== Civil Wars ==
After the failures of the Bishops' Wars, control of the militia was one of the major points of dispute between Charles I and Parliament that led to the First English Civil War. At the outbreak of hostilities in 1642 Lord Goring held Portsmouth for the king, but his attempts to raise the TBs led to several companies deserting to Parliament. There was a fight at Hogsdown outside Southampton on 11 August when Royalist supporters attempted to stop the Parliamentarians mustering the Hampshire TBs. They failed, and soon the TBs and Parliamentary supporters were blockading Portsmouth by land. Sir Thomas Jervoise Member of Parliament (MP) for the Hampshire constituency of Whitchurch commanded one of the regiments of Hampshire TBs, and four companies of his regiment (292 'common soldiers') served alongside Sir William Waller's Parliamentarian Southern Association Army at the subsequent Siege of Portsmouth and possibly that of Southsea Castle as well.

On the Isle of Wight Carisbrooke Castle was held for the king by the Countess of Portland and Col Brett. They were promptly besieged by Moses Read, Mayor of Newport, at the head of the Newport TB, assisted by 400 sailors. The garrison was only 20 strong, with three days' provisions, so the countess quickly surrendered on terms. Thereafter Col Sir John Leigh, MP for Yarmouth, commanded the TBs on the island for Parliament from 1642 to 1647.

However, as the war developed neither side made much further use of the TBs except as a source of recruits and weapons for their own full-time regiments. Richard Norton of Southwick Park, who had been colonel of a foot regiment of the Hampshire TBs in 1640–42, raised a regiment of horse for Parliament that served at the sieges of Basing House while Norton served as the Parliamentary governor of Southampton and later of Portsmouth. In contrast Sir John Mill, 1st Baronet, who had been a colonel of Hampshire TBs in 1625, raised regiments of horse and foot for the King, which served in the Royalist garrisons of Christchurch and Salisbury. It is claimed that some of the Hampshire TBs served in the Royalist Army at the Battle of Cheriton.

Once Parliament had established full control it passed new Militia Acts in 1648 and 1650 that replaced lords lieutenant with county commissioners appointed by Parliament or the Council of State. At the same time the term 'Trained Band' began to disappear in most counties. Under the Commonwealth and Protectorate the militia received pay when called out, and operated alongside the New Model Army to control the country.

During the Scottish invasion of the Third English Civil War the Hampshire Militia were ordered to a rendezvous at Oxford, but unlike some county militia they were not engaged at the subsequent Battle of Worcester.

== Restoration Militia ==
After the Restoration of the Monarchy, the English Militia was re-established by the Militia Act 1661 under the control of the king's lords-lieutenant, the men to be selected by ballot. This was popularly seen as the 'Constitutional Force' to counterbalance a 'Standing Army' tainted by association with the New Model Army that had supported Cromwell's military dictatorship, and almost the whole burden of home defence and internal security was entrusted to the militia under politically reliable local landowners.

== See also ==
- Militia (English)
- Hampshire Militia
- Isle of Wight Militia
