= Basil Acres =

English footballer

Personal information
- Full name: Basil Derek John Acres
- Date of birth: 27 November 1926
- Place of birth: Brantham, Suffolk, England
- Date of death: 23 July 2000 (aged 73)
- Place of death: Ipswich, Suffolk, England
- Position: Full back

Youth career
- Brantham

Senior career*
Years	Team	Apps	(Gls)
1951–1960	Ipswich Town	217	(6)
- * Club domestic league appearances and goals

Basil Derek John Acres (27 November 1926 – 23 July 2000) was an English professional footballer of the 1950s, who played at full back.

A native of the village of Brantham in the Babergh district of South Suffolk, Basil Acres began his career in his home parish, before signing with Ipswich Town F.C. in July 1951. In all, he spent nine seasons at the club, finally retiring in 1960, having made 217 Football League appearances there, and scoring six goals. After the end of his football career, he remained with the club, in various working capacities, for many years.

Basil Acres died at the age of 73.

== Honours ==
Ipswich Town

- Football League Third Division South: 1953–54, 1956–57

Individual

- Ipswich Town Hall of Fame: Inducted 2012
