= Egremont Radcliffe =

Egremont Radcliffe (or Egremont Radclyffe; c. 1540 – 1578) took part in the Rising of the North of 1569; after a period abroad, a showing of repentance to the English government was unsuccessful and he was imprisoned in the Tower of London.

== Life ==
His father was Henry Radcliffe, 2nd Earl of Sussex, and his mother was Henry's second wife Anne Calthorpe. When a young man he took part in the Rising of the North of 1569, an attempt by Catholic nobles to depose Queen Elizabeth I. He was so active that special instructions were given for his capture on its suppression. He managed, however, to escape over the Scottish border, and was for some time, with other rebels, the guest of the Scotts of Buccleuch.

A ship was provided to convey the party to Flanders, but news of the efforts the English government were making to intercept them having reached them, they seem to have sailed by way of Orkney. Once at Antwerp, Radcliffe received a pension of eight hundred ducats from the King of Spain. The diplomat Thomas Randolph heard in April 1571 that he had shot and killed an English merchant in Antwerp who refused to lend him money.

In the early part of 1572 he went on a mission to Madrid, where he was imprisoned for debt at the end of 1573; in 1574, having returned to the Low Countries, he went to France, and quit "the King of Spain's entertainment". He wrote many letters to Queen Elizabeth's adviser William Cecil and others about his pardon, and in February 1574–5 Thomas Wilson, writing to Cecil, spoke of him as "marvellously repentant"; he offered to serve in Ireland, and later in the same year he sent a letter to Wilson "full of submission, with great moan of his necessity". He moved in 1575 to Calais.

Radcliffe came in November 1575 to London; but when he showed himself at court he was sent to the Tower of London. About April 1577 he made petition to be allowed to take exercise in the little garden facing his prison, and to have a servant. He was confined in the Beauchamp Tower, where he cut his name, with the date 1576 and the motto "pour parvenir", in the wall of one of the cells.

On 10 May 1578 he was secretly released from prison, and exiled. He went to Flanders; here he incurred suspicion of being mixed up in a plot to poison Don John of Austria, presumably as the agent of the English government, and was consequently beheaded in the market-place of Namur.

Bernardino de Mendoza, the Spanish ambassador in England, describes him as "a rash and daring young man, ready for anything". Radcliffe was author of Politique Discourses translated out of French (London, 1578), dedicated to Sir Francis Walsingham, written while in the Beauchamp Tower.
