= John Huddleston (MP for Cambridgeshire) =

English politician

Sir John Huddleston (1517–1557) of Sawston, Cambridgeshire, was an English politician and supporter of Mary I.

== Family ==
Huddleston was a Justice of the Peace and sheriff of Cambridge during the reign of Edward VI. He married Bridget Cotton, and they had one daughter and two sons, one of whom was Sir Edmund (d.1606), a supporter of the Gunpowder Plot.

== Career ==
During the succession crisis of 1553, Huddleston supported Lady Mary Tudor at his home, Sawston Hall, as she fled from the threat of John Dudley, Duke of Northumberland, who wanted his daughter-in-law Lady Jane Grey to succeed. Sawston Hall was burned in response. As Huddleston followed Mary to Framlingham Castle, he captured Henry Radclyffe, the son of the Earl of Sussex, who was carrying papers to the Privy Council in London. Huddleston delivered Henry and the papers to Mary, who used the hostage to encourage the Earl to meet with her and support her claim to the throne.

After Mary I was crowned, she rewarded Huddleston's loyalty by allowing him to rebuild his home with stone from Cambridge Castle, and with estates and titles, including membership of the Privy Council. He was a member (MP) of the parliament of England for Cambridgeshire in October 1553, April 1554 and November 1554. Huddleston was appointed Vice-Chamberlain of the households of Mary I of England and Philip in 1554.

Huddleston died in 1557 and was succeeded by Bridget and Edmund.
