= William Gurdon (cricketer) =

English cricketer

Personal information
- Born: 12 October 1804; Norwich, Norfolk
- Died: 12 October 1884 (aged 80); Brantham, Suffolk

Domestic team information
- Years: Team
- 1825: Cambridge University
- Source: CricketArchive, 31 March 2013

William Gurdon (12 October 1804 – 12 October 1884) was an English judge and cricketer who played for Cambridge University in one match in 1825, totalling 28 runs with a highest score of 15.

Gurdon was educated at Eton College and Downing College, Cambridge. After graduating at Cambridge he was admitted to the Inner Temple and was called to the Bar in 1829. He was recorder of Bury St Edmunds c. 1840–60 and a judge of the county court of Essex 1847–71. He lived at Brantham Court, Suffolk, and is buried in Brantham churchyard.

== Bibliography ==
- Haygarth, Arthur (1862). Scores & Biographies, Volume 1 (1744–1826). Lillywhite.
