= Thomas Mildmay =

16th-century English politician and courtier

Sir Thomas Mildmay (ca. 1540–1608) was an English courtier and politician.

He was born the eldest son of Thomas Mildmay (before 1515–1566), educated at Christ's College, Cambridge and entered Lincoln's Inn in 1559. Walter Mildmay was his uncle.

He was elected Member of Parliament for Lostwithiel in the Parliament of 1563–1567 and knighted on 23 June 1567. He was then knight of the shire (MP) for Essex in 1571. He was Sheriff of Essex for 1572 and the Custos Rotulorum of Essex from 1576 to 1608.

He married firstly Lady Frances Radclyffe, daughter of Henry Radclyffe, 2nd Earl of Sussex, with whom he had three sons and a daughter and, secondly, Margaret Whettle (or Whitwell). His daughter, Anne, married Sir Roger Appleton, 1st Baronet.

Political offices
Preceded by Sir Anthony Cooke	Custos Rotulorum of Essex; 1576–1608	Succeeded by Thomas Howard, 1st Earl of Suffolk
