= Brantham =

Village in Suffolk, England

Coordinates: 51.969°N 1.063°E

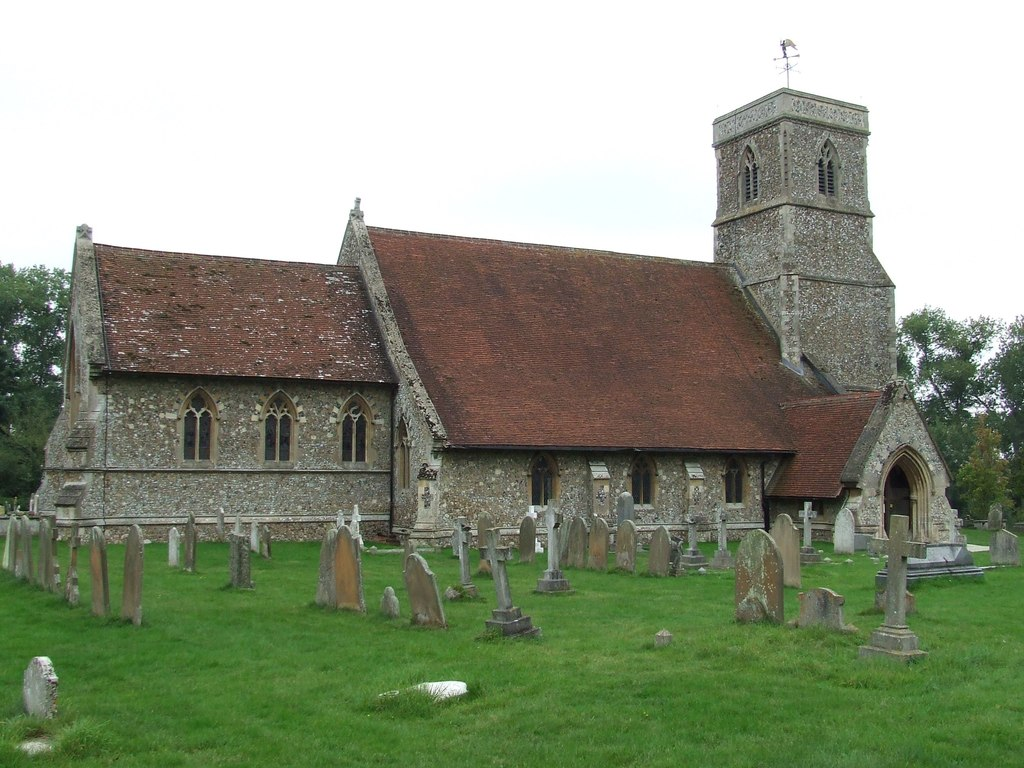
- St Michael's Church, Brantham

- Location within Suffolk
- Area: 7.66 km^{2} (2.96 sq mi)
- Population: 2,566 (2011)
  - Density: 335/km^{2} (870/sq mi)
- OS grid reference: TM105345
- Civil parish: Brantham
- District: Babergh
- Shire county: Suffolk
- Region: East
- Country: England
- Sovereign state: United Kingdom
- Post town: Manningtree
- Postcode district: CO11
- Dialling code: 01206
- Police: Suffolk
- Fire: Suffolk
- Ambulance: East of England
- UK Parliament: South Suffolk

Brantham (/ˈbrænθəm/ BRANTH-əm) is a village and civil parish in the Babergh district of Suffolk, England. It is located close to the River Stour and the border with Essex, around 2 miles (3 km) north of Manningtree, and around 9 miles (14 km) southwest of Ipswich. In 2011 the parish had a population of 2566.

== History ==
The name Brantham is of Old English origin — Brant for 'hill' and ham 'village' — hence, 'village on the hill'. Another possible translation may be 'burnt village', a name given after a Viking invasion coming up from the River Stour. Evidence of the village's Saxon heritage can be found in the form of some ninety silver coins from the time of Edward the Elder (899–924) in what has become known as the Brantham Hoard, found in the village in 2003.

Brantham is mentioned in the Domesday Book of 1086 as having 38 households and under the lordship of Aelfric of Weinhou. Until 1887 the local economy was almost entirely agricultural. This changed in 1887 when British Xylonite Ltd. purchased the 130-acre (0.53 km^{2}) Brooklands Farm and built their factory, which was later renamed BX Plastics. There was insufficient accommodation available locally for the workforce, so the company also built Brantham New Village, consisting of about 60 new houses.

== Recreation ==
Brantham Leisure Centre is a community-interest company providing venues for football, bowls, netball, cricket, and tennis, plus bar and function facilities.

The village's football club, Brantham Athletic, competes in the Premier Division of the Eastern Counties League.

Residents participate in a variety of recurring charitable events, including an annual Guy Fawkes Night fireworks event.

St Michael's Church publish a booklet detailing information about the local area and activities; a copy is given to each new resident.

== Historical buildings and notable former residents ==
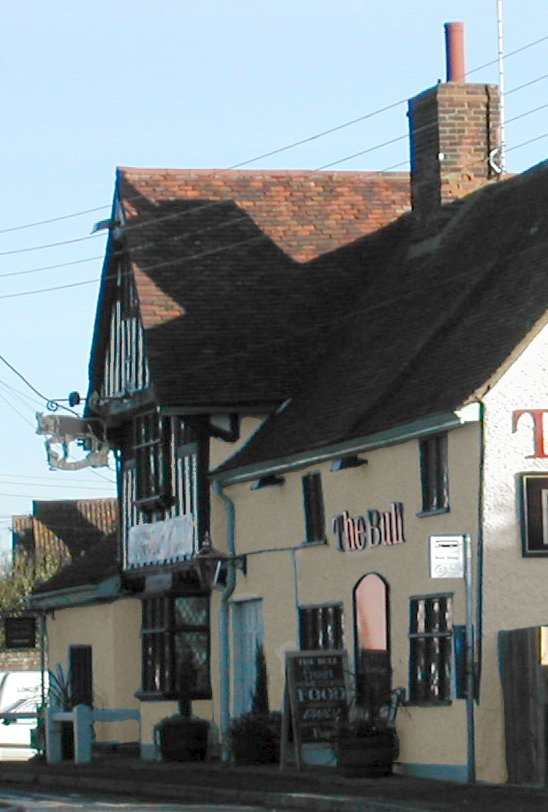
The Brantham Bull pub

Brantham's parish church of St. Michael and All Angels dates back to the 14th century, although it is believed a religious building has been on the site for over 1,000 years. The church also has connections with Dodnash Priory (founded in 1188). When the priory was dissolved at the time of the Reformation, it is thought that some of the priory's medieval glass was fitted in one of the south-facing nave windows. The church underwent extensive repairs in 2004 after fundraising efforts and a £23,000 grant from the UK National Lottery.

St Michael's owns one of only two known religious paintings by John Constable. "Christ blessing the children" was presented to the church by the artist himself in 1805. A reproduction hangs on display in the church today but the original is kept at the Ipswich Museum. Brantham is generally acknowledged, along with Flatford, Dedham and East Bergholt, to be part of "Constable Country". The artist chose a cottage in the village overlooking the Stour as a subject to one of his sketches 'Fisherman's cottage in Brantham with a view of Mistley Hall' in 1796. The drawing, which is in the V&A Museum in London, is one of the earliest dated drawings by Constable of which the whereabouts are now known.

The Tudor didactic poet Thomas Tusser settled at Katwade (now Cattawade) and is believed to have written his most famous work A Hundreth Good Pointes of Husbandrie at Brantham Hall. The lord of the manor of Brantham in the 15th century was 'shire knight of Suffolk' Sir John Braham (d.1420).

The village's oldest pub, the Brantham Bull, is a 16th-century Grade II listed building. Some of the beams from the building are thought to have come from the wreckage of the Spanish Armada, and over the centuries the building has also been used as a court house and a prison. Witch-finder general Matthew Hopkins once hanged a lady by the name of Nancy on the green outside the front of the building. A passage used by smugglers used to run from the pub's cellar out to the River Stour.

== Transport ==
Brantham is about half a mile from Manningtree station. A long railway cutting runs past the village. At one point near Brantham Bull, it is the deepest railway cutting in Suffolk. There was once a siding to Marsh Farm, where fresh fruit and vegetables were loaded for London, and a siding going into the old BX Plastics factory (now derelict) for loading and unloading materials. The former was disused by the end of the 1930s. The BX siding was active until the early 1960s for coal deliveries.

Greater Anglia planned to open a train depot on the site a former Imperial Chemical Industries factory. However the project was put on hold after the council raised concerns about the time that a nearby level crossing would be blocked for.

== Other notable buildings ==
There is a Catholic church (The Holy Family) on Brantham Hill.

There is a Methodist church situated in Gravel Pit Lane.

A small parade of commercial buildings are present on Birch Drive, including a Co-Operative store, a cafe, and a hairdressers.

Brooklands Community Primary School (Early years to year 6) is on Brooklands Road in the village, with a catchment area of the entire village and some outlying areas. It is part of the Orwell Multi Academy Trust.

== Notable residents ==
- Humphrey Wingfield (>1481-1545), lawyer and Speaker of the House of Commons of England between 1533 and 1536
- Robert Wingfield (c. 1513 - c. 1561), historian and devout Catholic supporter of Mary Tudor
- William Gurdon (1804–1884), first-class cricketer and recorder of Bury St Edmunds c. 1840–60 and a judge of the county court of Essex 1847–71.
- William Cooke (1821–1894), Church of England clergyman, hymn-writer, and translator who was curate at Brantham
- Basil Acres (1926–2000), professional footballer of the 1950s, who played at full back for Ipswich Town F.C.
