= Sawston Hall =

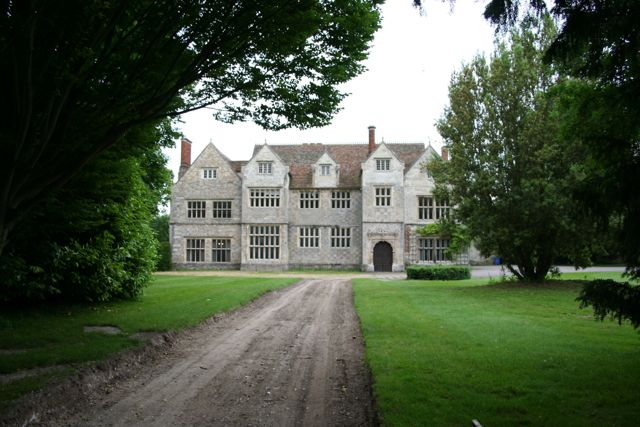
- Sawston Hall

- Location within Cambridgeshire
- 52°07′13″N 0°10′21″E
- Type: Manor House
- Location: Sawston

History
- Built: c.1557-1584

Site notes
- Area: Cambridgeshire
- Architectural style: Tudor

Listed Building – Grade I
- Official name: Sawston Hall
- Designated: 12 February 1958
- Reference no.: 1330979

Sawston Hall is a Grade I listed Tudor manor house in Sawston, Cambridgeshire dating from the 16th century. It has many fine features, such as the magnificent Great Hall complete with Elizabethan panelling and a large Tudor fireplace with fireback dated 1571. The house also has its own panelled private chapel which has an 18th-century decorated plaster ceiling and wonderful stained glass windows. On the first floor there is a long gallery and a bedroom where Queen Mary I is rumoured to have slept.

The hall is surrounded by almost 60 acres (24 ha) of grounds which includes a Site of Special Scientific Interest protected by Natural England due to the presence of Cambridge Milk Parsley, a rare English native plant. The ground also include a number of naturally fed springs, woodland walks, a half moat and a number of smaller landscaped gardens.

== History ==
The Sawston estate was held by the Huddleston family from 1517 until the 1980s. In 1553, Mary Tudor (soon to be Mary I of England), fleeing the Duke of Northumberland, spent the night at the Hall. Northumberland's soldiers set fire to the medieval manor destroying a large portion of the hall.

The Hall was re-built by Sir John and Edmund Huddleston between 1557 and 1584 with the help of a licence granted by Queen Mary to use stone from Cambridge Castle. During the re-building Mary died and was succeeded by Elizabeth I. This resulted in the construction of a number of priest holes in the building by Nicholas Owen, allowing the Huddleston family to continue their practice of the Catholic faith. The priest's hole at the top of the spiral staircase at Sawston Hall is noted as one of the finest examples in the country.

During the Second World War Sawston Hall, still under the ownership of the Huddlestons, was the headquarters of the 66th Fighter Wing, part of the USAAF Eighth Air Force. An air raid shelter still remains in the grounds, and on the top floor war-time graffiti still adorns the walls. In 1982 the Huddleston family sold the hall which became a language school until it was purchased in 2010. It was last for sale in 2014 for £4.75 million.

Sawston Hall sits adjacent to the, earlier, Norman-styled St Mary's church.

Sawston Hall was the location used for the 1971 Michael Winner film "The Nightcomers". It was featured extensively including many scenes providing interior shots of the house throughout.
