= Thomas Radclyffe, 3rd Earl of Sussex =

Lord Deputy of Ireland

The Right Honorable The Earl of Sussex KG
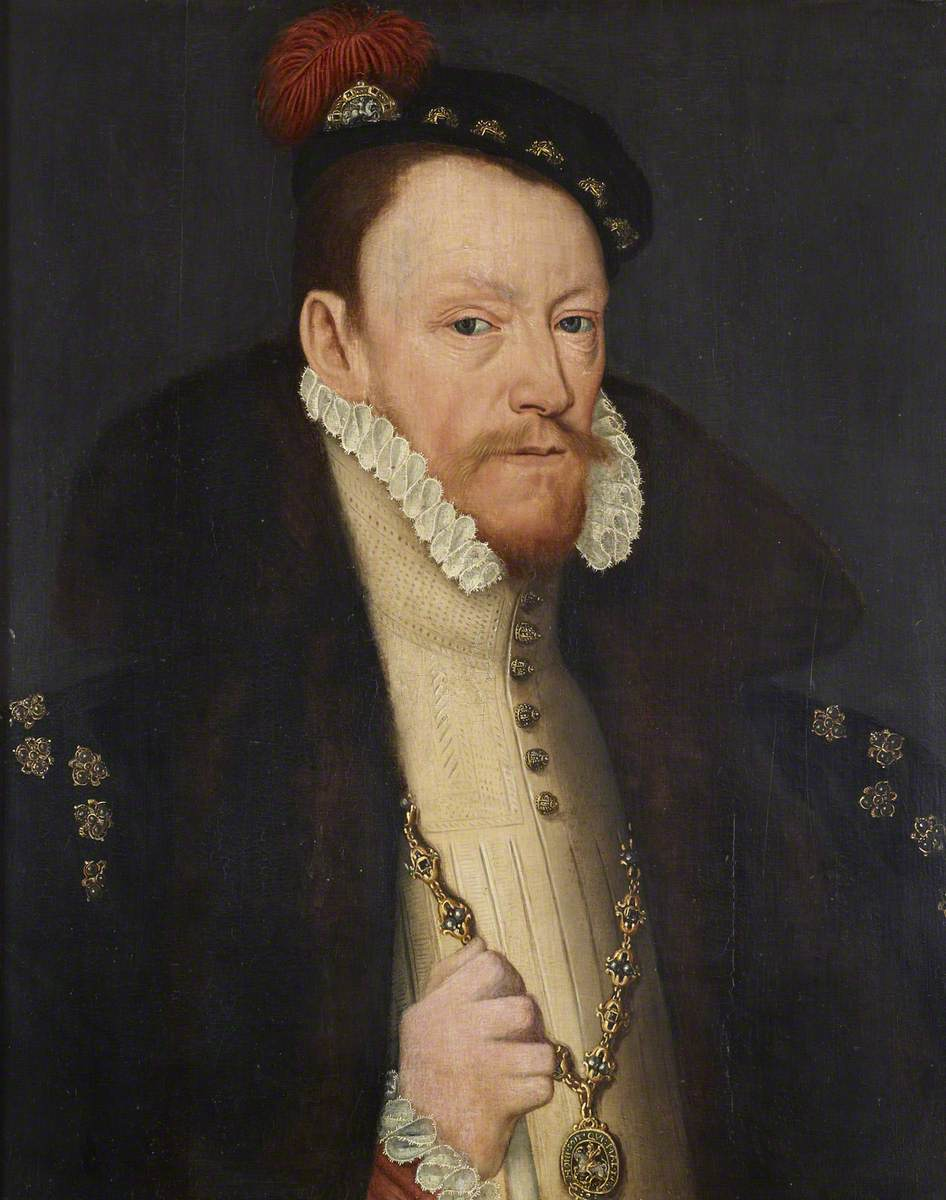
- The Earl of Sussex, c. 1575–80

Lord Lieutenant of Ireland
- In office 6 May 1560 – 13 October 1565
- Monarch: Elizabeth I
- Preceded by: Himself as Lord Deputy
- Succeeded by: Sir Henry Sidney

Personal details
- Born: 1525
- Died: 9 June 1583 (aged 57–58)
- Spouse(s): Elizabeth Wriothesley; Lady Frances Sidney (m. 1555–1583)
- Parents: Henry Radclyffe, 2nd Earl of Sussex (father); Elizabeth Howard (mother)
- Religion: Roman Catholicism

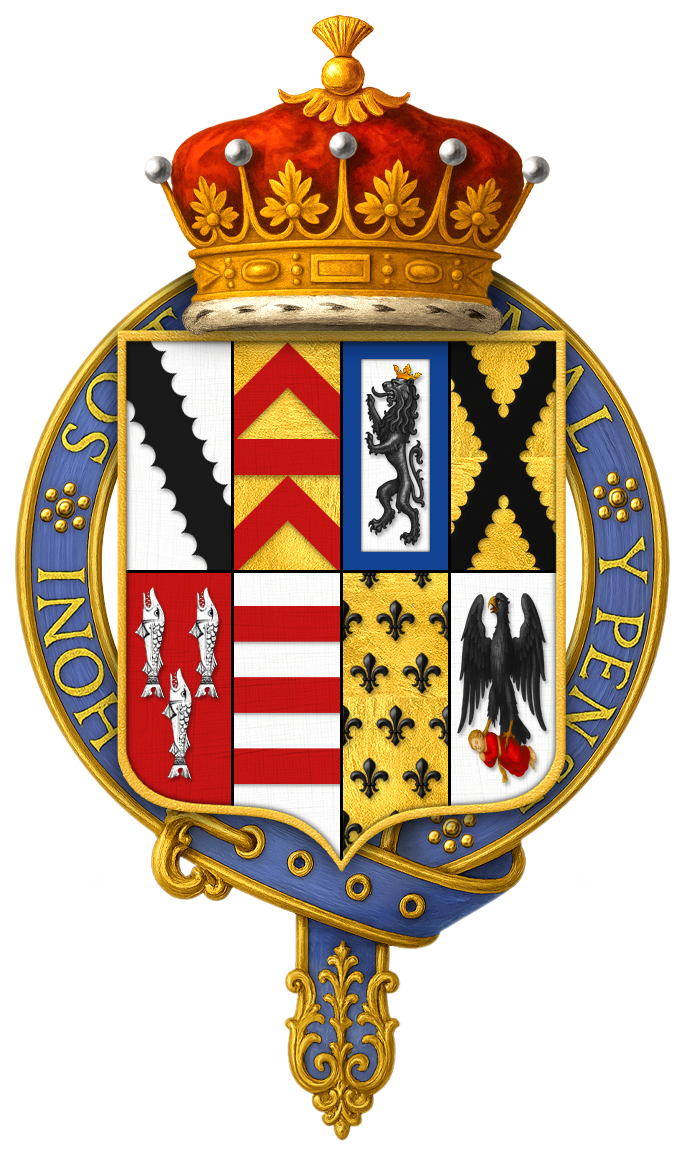
Quartered Arms of Sir Thomas Radclyffe, 3rd Earl of Sussex, KG

Thomas Radclyffe (or Ratclyffe), 3rd Earl of Sussex KG (c. 1525 – 9 June 1583), was Lord Deputy of Ireland during the Tudor period of English history, and a leading courtier during the reign of Elizabeth I.

== Family ==
He was the eldest son of Henry Radclyffe, 2nd Earl of Sussex, and his first wife Elizabeth Howard. His maternal grandparents were Thomas Howard, 2nd Duke of Norfolk, and his second wife, Agnes Tilney.

His maternal uncles included, among others, Thomas Howard, 3rd Duke of Norfolk and Lord Edmund Howard (father of Queen Katherine Howard); Sir Edward Howard; Lord William Howard, 1st Baron Howard of Effingham; and Lord Thomas Howard. His aunt, Elizabeth Howard, Lady Boleyn, was the mother of Queen Anne Boleyn.

== Early life ==
He was born about 1525, and after his father's succession to the earldom in 1542 was styled Viscount Fitzwalter. After serving in the army abroad, he was employed in 1551 to negotiate a marriage between King Edward VI and a daughter of Henry II of France. Radclyffe's prominence in the kingdom was shown by his inclusion among the signatories to the letters patent of 16 June 1553 settling the crown on Lady Jane Grey as Edward's successor.

Nevertheless, he won favour with Queen Mary I, who employed him in arranging her marriage with Philip II of Spain. As a reward, Philip gave him three diamonds, two rubies, and a sword. Mary created him Baron Fitzwalter in August 1553.

== Sussex in Ireland ==
Returning to England from a mission to Charles V, Holy Roman Emperor, in April 1556, Fitzwalter was appointed Lord Deputy of Ireland. According to the Encyclopædia Britannica Eleventh Edition, the "prevailing anarchy in Ireland, a country which, nominally subject to the English Crown, was torn by feuds among its practically independent native chieftains, rendered the task of the lord deputy one of no ordinary difficulty; a difficulty that was increased by the ignorance of English statesmen concerning Ireland and Irish conditions, and by their incapacity to devise or to carry into execution any consistent and thorough-going policy for bringing the half-conquered island under an orderly system of administration."

Fitzwalter effected Queen Mary's policy for Ireland: the reversal of the partial attempts that had been made during the short reign of Edward VI to promote Protestantism there, the "plantation" by English settlers in the midlands and the shiring of King's County and Queen's County in 1556, named after Mary and her husband Philip. But before Fitzwalter could attend to such matters he had to make an expedition into Ulster, which was being kept in a constant state of disturbance by the Highland Scots from Kintyre and the Islands who were making settlements along the Antrim coast in the district of the "Glynnes" (now known as the Glens of Antrim), and by the efforts of Shane O'Neill to dominate more territory in Ulster. Brutal methods were deployed, as Sussex sent the earl of Ormond, Sir Nicholas Bagenal and other captains to Rathlin Island on 3 September 1557. They stayed for three days and hunted down the occupants of the island, and it was noted that they killed 'as many as they might come by or get out of caves, both man, woman, child and beasts'.

Having defeated O'Neill and his allies, the MacDonnells, the lord deputy, who by the death of his father in February 1557 became Earl of Sussex, returned to Dublin, where he summoned a parliament in June of that year. Statutes were passed declaring the legitimacy of Mary I as Queen of the Kingdom of Ireland, reviving the laws for the suppression of heresy and forbidding the immigration of Scots. Having carried this legislation, Sussex endeavoured to give forcible effect to it, first by taking the field against Donough O'Conor, whom he failed to capture, and afterwards against Shane O'Neill, whose lands in Tyrone he ravaged (causing artificial famine by the burning of crops and killing of livestock), restoring to their nominal rights the Earl of Tyrone and his reputed son Matthew O'Neill, Baron of Dungannon. In June of the following year Sussex turned his attention to the west, where the head of the O'Brien clan had ousted his nephew Conor O'Brien, Earl of Thomond, from his possessions, and refused to pay allegiance to the Crown; he forced Limerick to open its gates to him, restored Thomond, and proclaimed The O'Brien a traitor.

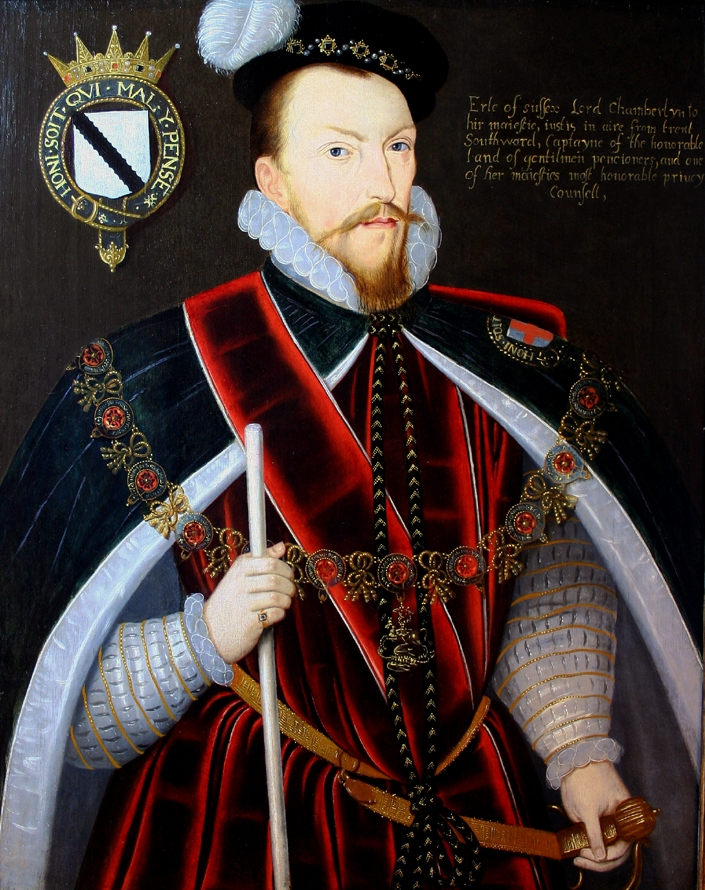
The Earl of Sussex, by Marcus Gheeraerts the Younger, c. 1580s

In the autumn of 1558 the continued inroads of the Scottish islanders in the Antrim glens called for drastic treatment by the lord deputy. Sussex sailed from Dublin in the Mary Willoughby to Campbeltown Loch on the Kintyre peninsula. He burnt farms and houses including Saddell, a castle of James MacDonnell or MacDonald of Dunyvaig and Glynnes (died 1565), and then marched south to burn Dunaverty and Machrimore. He then burnt farms on the islands Arran, Bute, and Cumbrae. Landing at Carrickfergus, he fired and plundered the settlements of the Scots on the Antrim coast before returning to Dublin for Christmas.

Far from being reluctant to employ scorched earth tactics because of the high civilian mortality that it wrought (as has been claimed elsewhere), the government forces resorted to land and crop-burning repeatedly during the mid-Tudor and early Elizabethan years, and did so precisely because it promised to wreak the most havoc, and kill the most people. Once in Ulster's Gaelic heartland Sussex's army moved freely about, burning at will. Presumably because he could not linger in the province for as long as he would have liked, the earl prioritised the fastest route to a lasting impact: famine. Hence his ordering the slaughter of 4,000 captured cows in Tír Eoghain. As early as 1558 large parts of the country were destroyed by war, whole areas depopulated. According to Archbishop Dowdall, it was possible to ride 30 miles across much of central and southern Ulster without seeing any sign of life. Famine stalked the province.

— David Edwards, Age of Atrocity: Violence and Political Conflict in Early Modern Ireland, 2010.

In the metropolis, the news reached him of the queen's death. Crossing to England, he took part in the ceremonial of Queen Elizabeth's coronation in January 1559; and in the following July, he returned to Ireland with a fresh commission, now as lord lieutenant, from the new queen, whose policy required him to come to terms if possible with the troublesome leaders of the O'Neills and the MacDonnells. Shane O'Neill refused to meet Sussex without security for his safety, and having established his power in Ulster he demanded terms of peace which Elizabeth was unwilling to grant. Sussex failed in his efforts to bring Shane to submission, either by open warfare or by subterfuge.

He was preparing for a fresh attempt when he was superseded by Gerald FitzGerald, 11th Earl of Kildare, who was commissioned by Elizabeth to open negotiations with O'Neill, the result of which was that the latter repaired to London and made a formal submission to the queen. Shane's conduct on his return to Ireland was no less rebellious than before, and energetic measures against him became more imperative than ever. Having obtained Elizabeth's sanction, Sussex conducted a campaign in the summer of 1563 with Armagh as his temporary headquarters; but except for some indecisive skirmishing and the seizure of many of O'Neill's cattle, the operations led to no result and left O'Neill with his power little diminished. His continued failure to effect a purpose for the accomplishment of which he possessed inadequate resources led Sussex to pray for his recall from Ireland, and his wish was granted in May 1564. His government of Ireland had not, however, been wholly without fruit.

== Sussex the politician ==
Sussex was the first representative of the English Crown who enforced authority to any considerable extent beyond the limits of the Pale; the policy of planting English settlers in Offaly and Leix was carried out by him in 1562 with a certain measure of success; and although he fell far short of establishing English rule throughout any large part of Ireland, he made its influence felt in remote parts of the island, such as Thomond and the Glynnes of Antrim, where the independence of the native septs had hitherto been subjected not even to nominal interference. His letters from Ireland display a just conception of the problems with which he was confronted, and of the methods by which their solution should be undertaken; and his failure was due, not to lack of statesmanship or of executive capacity on his own part, but to the insufficiency of the resources placed at his command and want of insight and persistence on the part of Elizabeth and her ministers. He also had to contend with the hostility of certain highly placed officials in the Dublin administration, led by John Parker, the Master of the Rolls in Ireland. Parker, a strong Protestant and English by birth, accused Sussex of having Roman Catholic sympathies, a charge to which Sussex was clearly vulnerable in light of his loyal service to Queen Mary in her efforts to stamp out heresy in Ireland.

== Sussex as courtier ==
On his return to England, Sussex, who before leaving Ireland had to endure the indignity of an inquiry into his administration instigated by his enemies and led by John Parker, threw himself into opposition to Robert Dudley, Earl of Leicester, especially in regard to the suggested marriage between Leicester and the queen. He does not appear to have incurred Elizabeth's displeasure, for in 1566 and the following year she employed him in negotiations for bringing about a different matrimonial alliance which he warmly supported, the proposal that she should bestow her hand on the Archduke Charles. When this project failed, Sussex returned from Vienna to London in March 1568, and in July he was appointed Lord President of the North, a position which threw on him the responsibility of dealing with the rebellion of the Northern Earls of Northumberland and Westmorland in the following year. The weakness of the force at his disposal rendered necessary at the outset a caution which engendered some suspicion of his loyalty, and this suspicion was increased by the counsel of moderation which he urged upon the queen; but in 1570 he laid waste the border, invaded Scotland, and raided the country round Dumfries, reducing the rebel leaders to complete submission.

In July 1572 Sussex became Lord Chamberlain, and he was henceforth in frequent attendance on Queen Elizabeth, both in her progresses through the country and at court, until his death. Elizabeth I came to his house New Hall in September 1579. She was greeted by a theatrical entertainment of Jupiter and a thunderstorm. The next day there was jousting, and a pageant of a sleeping knight, which the Queen revived. The Earl of Sussex gave Elizabeth a white palfey horse, a cloak, and a safeguard "to keep her from evil weather that might hap" in the next day's hunting.

== Family ==
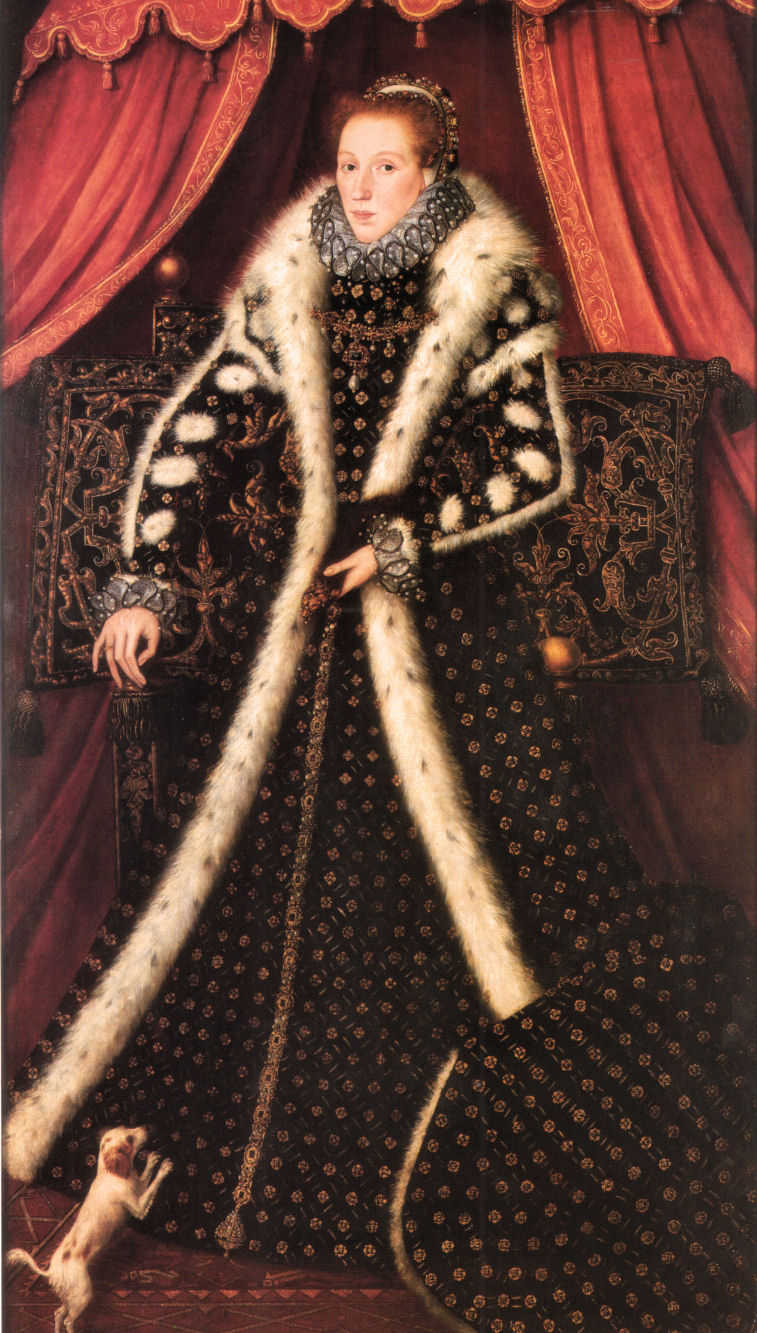
Frances Sydney The Countess of Sussex c. 1570–75

He married twice: first to Elizabeth, daughter of Thomas Wriothesley, 1st Earl of Southampton; and secondly to Frances, daughter of Sir William Sidney of Penshurst. His second wife, Frances, was the foundress of Sidney Sussex College, Cambridge, which she endowed by her will, and whose name commemorates the father and the husband of the countess. The Earl left no children, and at his death, his titles passed to his brother Henry Radclyffe, 4th Earl of Sussex.

== See also ==
- Elizabeth R
- Elizabeth
- Sussex's Men

Political offices
Preceded by The Marquess of Northampton	Captain of the Gentlemen Pensioners; 1553–1558	Succeeded by The Lord Hunsdon
Preceded by Sir Anthony St. Leger	Lord Deputy of Ireland; 1556–1558	Succeeded by Lords Justices
Unknown	Lord Lieutenant of Norfolk; 1557–1559	Succeeded by The Duke of Norfolk
Unknown	Lord Lieutenant of Suffolk; 1557–1583	Vacant Title next held by The Lord Hunsdon
Preceded by Lords Justices	Lord Deputy of Ireland; 1559–1560	Succeeded by Sir Henry Sidney as lord deputy
Preceded by Lords Justices	Lord Lieutenant of Ireland; 1560–1565	Succeeded by Sir Henry Sidney as lord deputy
Preceded by The Lord Howard of Effingham	Lord Chamberlain; 1572–1585	Succeeded by The Lord Hunsdon
Legal offices
Preceded by The Earl of Sussex	Justice in Eyre south of the Trent; 1557–1583	Succeeded by The Earl of Bedford
Peerage of England
Preceded by Henry Radclyffe	Earl of Sussex; 1557–1583	Succeeded by Henry Radclyffe
Preceded by Henry Radclyffe	Baron FitzWalter (writ in acceleration); 1553–1583	Succeeded by Henry Radclyffe
