= Robert Wingfield (historian) =

Robert Wingfield (c. 1513 – c. 1561) was an English historian.

== Early life ==
He was the son of Sir Humphrey Wingfield and his wife Anne (née Wiseman). He married Bridget Pargiter, daughter of Sir John Pargiter and they had a son, Humphrey. Upon his father's death in 1545, he inherited lands in Brantham and Ipswich.

== Vita Mariae Angliae reginae ==
A devout Catholic, from 24 to 26 July 1553 he played host at his Ipswich home to Queen Mary during her journey to London to claim the throne against Lady Jane Grey. Mary rewarded him with a £20 life annuity. He wrote a detailed account of Mary's coup d'état titled Vita Mariae Angliae reginae, dedicated to Sir Edward Waldegrave. It was proof read by Roger Ascham, although Wingfield was dissatisfied with Ascham's shoddy editing.

Wingfield composed the work in Latin and it covers the death of Edward VI to summer 1554. It's written from a pro-Mary, pro-Catholic viewpoint and contains information on the coup in East Anglia that is not available anywhere else. It survived in a single MSS., which was translated, edited and published by Diarmaid MacCulloch in 1984.

== Later life ==
Evidence for Wingfield's last years is lacking. Poverty necessitated the sale of Brantham to a local gentleman, Robert Bogas, in the early 1560s. He was buried at Brantham.

== Works ==
- 'The Vita Mariae Angliae Reginae of Robert Wingfield of Brantham', ed. and trans. D. MacCulloch, Camden miscellany, XXVIII, CS, 4th ser., 29 (1984), pp. 181–301.
