= Earl of Sussex =

Earldom in the Peerage of Great Britain

Arms of Lennard: Or, on a fess gules three fleurs-de-lys of the field

Arms of Radcliffe: Argent, a bend engrailed sable

Earl of Sussex is a title that has been created several times in the Peerages of England, Great Britain, and the United Kingdom. The early Earls of Arundel (up to 1243) were often also called Earls of Sussex.

The fifth creation came in the Peerage of Great Britain in 1717 in favour of Talbot Yelverton, 2nd Viscount Longueville. The Yelverton family descended from Christopher Yelverton, Speaker of the House of Commons from 1597 to 1598. Christopher's grandson and namesake, Christopher Yelverton, was created a baronet, of Easton Mauduit in the County of Northampton, in the Baronetage of England in 1641. He was succeeded by his son, Henry, the second Baronet. He married Susan Longueville, suo jure 13th Baroness Grey de Ruthyn. Their eldest son, Charles, succeeded in both the baronetcy and barony. However, he died young and was succeeded by his younger brother, Henry, the fifteenth Baron. In 1690 he was created Viscount Longueville in the Peerage of England. Henry's son, Talbot, the aforementioned second Viscount, was created Earl of Sussex in 1717. Henry's two sons, George and Henry, both succeeded in the earldom. The baronetcy, viscountcy and earldom became extinct on Henry's death in 1799. He was succeeded in the barony of Grey de Ruthyn by his grandson, Henry, the nineteenth Baron, the son of his daughter Lady Barbara Yelverton by Colonel Edward Thoroton Gould. See Baron Grey de Ruthyn for further history of this title.

== Earls of Sussex; First creation (1282) ==
- John de Warenne, 1st Earl of Sussex (1231–1304)
- John de Warenne, 2nd Earl of Sussex (1286–1347)

== Earls of Sussex; Second creation (1529) ==
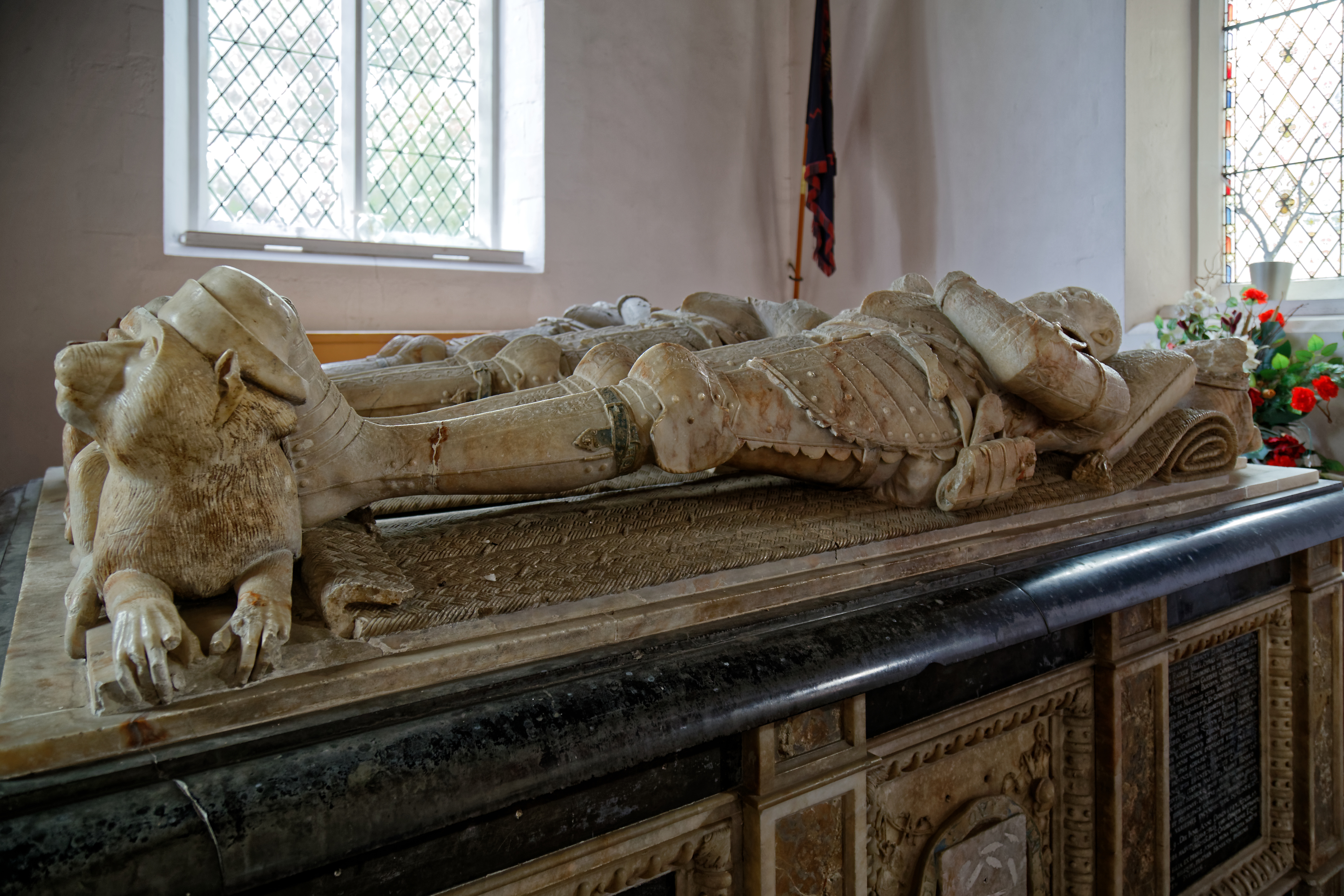
Monument to the 1st, 2nd and 3rd Radcliffe Earls of Sussex in St Andrew's Church, Boreham, Essex Originally built in the 16th century and rebuilt in the 19th, the Sussex Chapel running south off the chancel is for this 1587-1589 tomb of the first three Earls of Sussex, of the second creation: Robert, Henry and Thomas, built by Richard Stevens of Southwark, in the Grade I listed 11th- to 15th-century Parish Church of St Andrew's, in Boreham village, Essex, England. Ape foot-rests wearing caps of maintenance.

- Robert Radcliffe, 1st Earl of Sussex (1483–1542)
- Henry Radclyffe, 2nd Earl of Sussex (1507–1557)
- Thomas Radclyffe, 3rd Earl of Sussex (1525–1583)
- Henry Radclyffe, 4th Earl of Sussex (1532–1593)
- Robert Radclyffe, 5th Earl of Sussex (1573–1629)
- Edward Radclyffe, 6th Earl of Sussex (1559–1643)

Subsidiary titles: Viscount FitzWalter (1525), Baron FitzWalter (1295) (1st–5th Earls)

=== Family tree ===
Baron FitzWalter, Viscount FitzWalter, Earl FitzWalter, Viscount Harwich and Earl of Sussex (2nd creation)

Baron FitzWalter, 1295
Robert FitzWalter; 1247–1326; 1st Baron FitzWalter [1295–1326]
Robert FitzWalter; 1300–1328; 2nd Baron FitzWalter
John FitzWalter before 1315–1361; 3rd Baron FitzWalter
Walter FitzWalter; 1345–1386; 4th Baron FitzWalter
Walter FitzWalter; 1368–1406; 5th Baron FitzWalter
Humphrey FitzWalter; 1398–1415; 6th Baron FitzWalter	Walter FitzWalter; 1400–1431; 7th Baron FitzWalter
Elizabeth FitzWalter; 1430–1485; 8th Baroness FitzWalter	John Radcliffe (d. 28 March 1461)
John Radcliffe; 1451–1496; 9th Baron FitzWalter
Viscount FitzWalter, 1525; Earl of Sussex (2nd creation), 1529
Robert Radcliffe; 1483–1542; 1st Earl of Sussex, etc., 10th Baron FitzWalter [1525–1542]
Henry Radcliffe; 1507–1557; 2nd Earl of Sussex, etc., 11th Baron FitzWalter [1542–1557]	Humphrey Radcliffe d. 1566
Thomas Radcliffe c. 1525–1583; 3rd Earl of Sussex, etc., 12th Baron FitzWalter [1557–1583]	Henry Radcliffe c. 1530–1593; 4th Earl of Sussex, etc., 13th Baron FitzWalter [1583–1593]	Frances Radcliffe d. 1602	Thomas Mildmay d. 1608	Edward Radcliffe; 1559–1643; 6th Earl of Sussex, etc. [1629–1643]
Earldom of Sussex and Viscountcy of FitzWalter extinct, 1643
Robert Radcliffe; 1573–1629; 5th Earl of Sussex, etc., 14th Baron FitzWalter [1593–1629]	Henry Mildmay c. 1585–1654 de jure 15th Baron FitzWalter
Barony of FitzWalter dormant, 1629
Robert Mildmay d. 1646
Henry Mildmay d. 1662 de jure 16th Baron FitzWalter	Benjamin Mildmay c. 1646–1679; 17th Baron FitzWalter de jure [1662–1667], confirmed [1667–1679]	Mary Mildmay; 1637–1715	Henry Mildmay (d. 13 December 1692)
Earl FitzWalter and Viscount Harwich, 1730	Bridges Baronets of Goodnestone, County Kent, 1718
Charles Mildmay (1670–d. 1727/1728); 18th Baron FitzWalter	Benjamin Mildmay; 1672–1756; 1st Earl FitzWalter and Viscount Harwich, 19th Baron FitzWalter [1730–1756]	Frederica Schomberg; 1687–1751 formerly Countess of Holderness	Frances Mildmay; 1666–1705	Christopher Fowler	Brook Bridges; 1679–1728; 1st Baronet [1718–1728]
Earldom of FitzWalter, Viscountcy of Harwich extinct and FitzWalter Barony (1295 creation) extinct, 1756
Edmund Fowler c. 1701–1751	Brook Bridges; 1709–1733; 2nd Baronet [1728–1733]
Fanny Fowler; 1746–1825	Brook William Bridges; 1733–1791; 3rd Baronet
Brook William Bridges; 1767–1829; 4th Baronet	Reverend Brook Henry; 1769–1855	Reverend Brook Edward Bridges
Baron FitzWalter of Woodham Walter, County Kent, 1868
Brook William Bridges; 1801–1875; 1st Baron FitzWalter, 5th Baronet [1868–1875]	Brook George Bridges; 1802–1890; 6th Baronet [1875–1890]	Eleanor Bridges; 1805–1892	Reverend Henry Western Plumptre d. 1863	Thomas Pym Bridges; 1805–1895; 7th Baronet [1890–1895]	George Talbot Bridges; 1818–1899; 8th Baronet [1895–1899]
FitzWalter Barony of Woodham Walter, County Kent extinct, 1875	Bridges Baronetcy extinct, 1899
John Bridges Plumptre; 1832–1888	Elizabeth Wright; 1835–1909
Baron FitzWalter (1295 creation) abeyance terminated, 1924
Henry FitzWalter Plumptre; 1860–1932; 20th Baron FitzWalter [1924–1932]	George Beresford Plumptre; 1869–1934
Baron FitzWalter (1295 creation) abeyant, 1932
Baron FitzWalter (1295 creation) abeyance terminated, 1953
FitzWalter Brook Plumptre; 1914–2004; 21st Baron FitzWalter [1953–2004]
Julian Brook Plumptre b. 1952; 22nd Baron FitzWalter [2004–present]
Edward Brook Plumptre b. 1989

== Earls of Sussex, Third creation (1644) ==
=== Baron Savile of Pontefract (1628) ===
- John Savile, 1st Baron Savile of Pontefract (1556–1630) (Alternative spelling Baron Savile of Pomfret)
- Thomas Savile, 2nd Baron Savile of Pontefract (1590 – c. 1659) (created Earl of Sussex in 1644)

=== Earls of Sussex, Third creation (1644) ===
- Thomas Savile, 1st Earl of Sussex (1590–1659)
- James Savile, 2nd Earl of Sussex (1647–1671)

Subsidiary titles: Viscount Savile (1628), Baron Castlebar (1628)

== Earls of Sussex; Fourth creation (1674) ==
- Thomas Lennard, 1st Earl of Sussex (1654 – 1715)

Subsidiary title: Baron Dacre (1321)

== Earls of Sussex; Fifth creation (1717) ==
=== Yelverton baronets, of Easton Mauduit (1641) ===
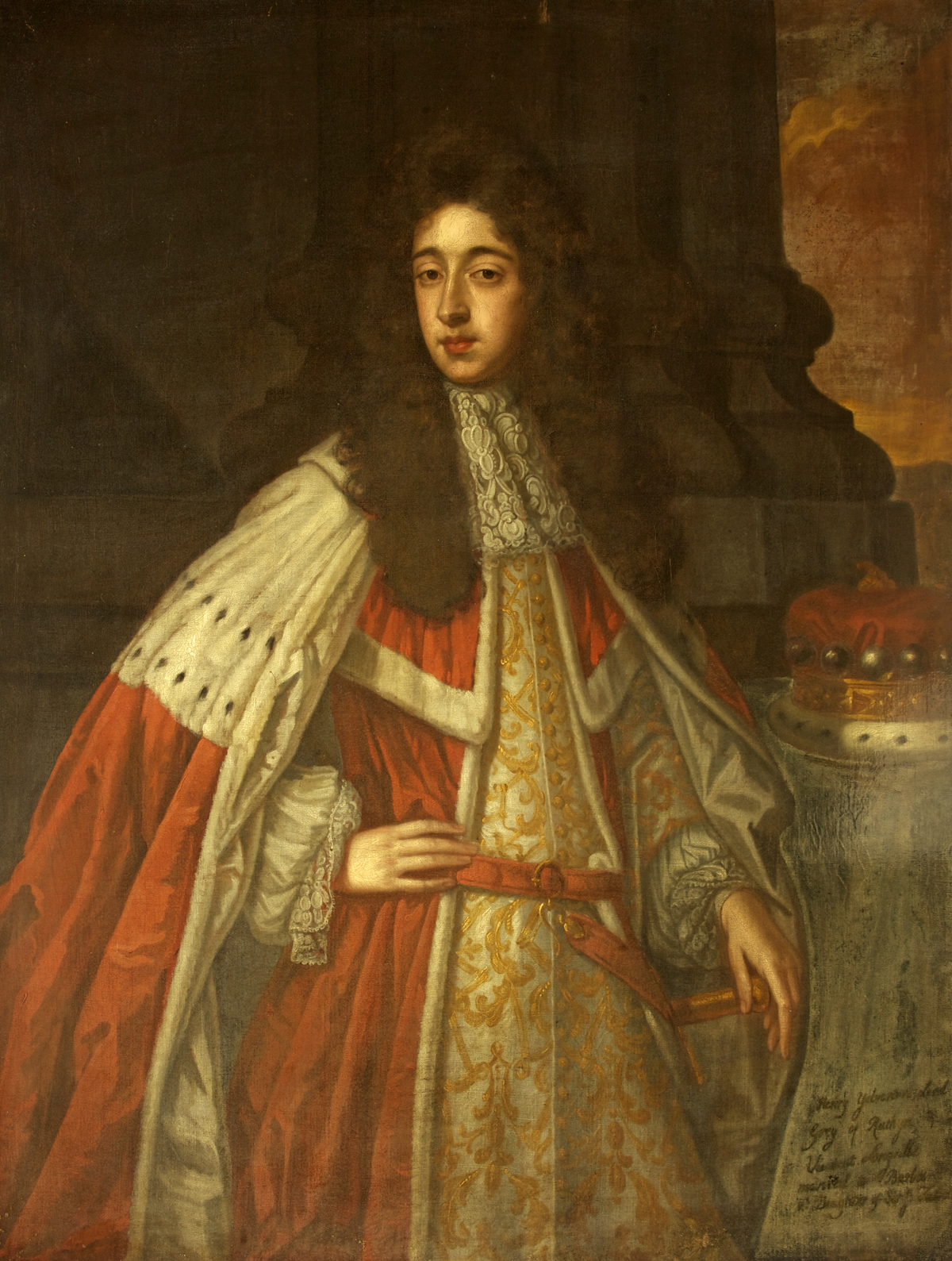
Henry Yelverton, 1st Viscount Longueville

- Christopher Yelverton, 1st Baronet (died 1654)
- Henry Yelverton, 2nd Baronet (1633–1670)
- Charles Yelverton, 3rd Baronet (1657–1679) (succeeded as Baron Grey de Ruthyn in 1676)

=== Barons Grey de Ruthyn (1324) ===
- Charles Yelverton, 14th Baron Grey de Ruthyn (1657–1679)
- Henry Yelverton, 15th Baron Grey de Ruthyn (died 1704) (created Viscount Longueville in 1690)

=== Viscounts Longueville; First creation (1690) ===
- Henry Yelverton, 1st Viscount Longueville (died 1704)
- Talbot Yelverton, 2nd Viscount Longueville (1690–1731) (created Earl of Sussex in 1717)

=== Earls of Sussex; Fifth creation (1717) ===
- Talbot Yelverton, 1st Earl of Sussex (1690–1731)
- George Augustus Yelverton, 2nd Earl of Sussex (1727–1758)
- Henry Yelverton, 3rd Earl of Sussex (1728–1799)

=== Family tree ===
Grosvenor and Grey family tree: Dukes of Westminster, Marquesses of Westminster
Earls: Grosvenor, Sussex (5th creation), and of Wilton
Viscounts: Belgrave, Grey de Wilton, and de Longueville and
Barons: Grey de Wilton, Grey of Ruthin (Ruthyn), Grey de Radcliffe, Ebury, Grosvenor, and Stalbridge

Baron Grey de Wilton (1st creation), 1285
Reginald Grey d. 1308; 1st Baron Grey de Wilton
John Grey c. 1268–1323; 2nd Baron Grey de Wilton
Baron Grey of Ruthin, 1324
Henry Grey; 1281–1342; 3rd Baron Grey de Wilton	Roger Grey d. 1352/1353; 1st Baron Grey of Ruthin	King Edward III; 1312–1377
Reynold Grey; 1311–1370; 4th Baron Grey de Wilton	Reynold Grey c. 1322 – c. 1388; 2nd Baron Grey of Ruthin	John of Gaunt; 1340–1399	Thomas Holland; Earl of Kent c. 1314–1360
Henry Grey c. 1340–1396; 5th Baron Grey de Wilton	Reynold Grey c. 1362 – c. 1440; 3rd Baron Grey of Ruthin	Elizabeth of Lancaster bef. 1363–1426	John Holland; Earl of Huntingdon; Duke of Exeter c. 1352–1400
Richard Grey c. 1393–1442; 6th Baron Grey de Wilton	John Grey c. 1387–1439	Constance Holland; 1387–1437
Reynold Grey c. 1421–1493/94; 7th Baron Grey de Wilton	Edmund Grey c. 1362 – c. 1440; 1st Earl of Kent, 4th Baron Grey of Ruthin	See Template:Dukes of Kent family tree
Edmund Grey d. 1499; 8th Baron Grey de Wilton	George Grey; 2nd Earl of Kent, 5th Baron Grey of Ruthin c. 1460–1503
Edmund Grey c. 1469–1511; 9th Baron Grey de Wilton	Richard Grey; 3rd Earl of Kent, 6th Baron Grey of Ruthin; 1481–1524	Henry Grey; 4th Earl of Kent, 7th Baron Grey of Ruthin c. 1495–1562
George Grey c. 1493–1514/1515; 10th Baron Grey de Wilton	Thomas Grey c. 1496–1517; 11th Baron Grey de Wilton	Richard Grey c. 1505–1523; 12th Baron Grey de Wilton	William Grey c. 1509–1562; 13th Baron Grey de Wilton	Henry Grey; 1520–1545
Arthur Grey; 1536–1593; 14th Baron Grey de Wilton	Reginald Grey d. 1573; 5th Earl of Kent, 8th Baron Grey of Ruthin	Henry Grey; 1541–1615; 6th Earl of Kent, 9th Baron Grey of Ruthin	Charles Grey c. 1545–1623; 7th Earl of Kent, 10th Baron Grey of Ruthyn
Bridget Grey d. 1648	Thomas Grey; 1575–1614; 15th Baron Grey de Wilton	Susan Grey	Henry Grey c. 1583–1639; 8th Earl of Kent, 11th Baron Grey of Ruthyn
Barony Grey de Wilton (1st creation) extinct, 1614
Baronet of Egerton and Oulton, 1617
Roland Egerton d. 1646; 1st Baronet	Charles Longueville; 1612–1643; 12th Baron Grey de Ruthyn
John Egerton d. 1674; 2nd Baronet	Susan Longueville d. 1676; 13th Baroness Grey de Ruthyn suo jure
Viscount Longueville (1st creation), 1690
John Egerton d. 1729; 3rd Baronet	Charles Yelverton; 1657–1679; 14th Baron Grey de Ruthyn	Henry Yelverton c. 1664–1703/1704; 1st Viscount Longueville, 15th Baron Grey de Ruthyn
Earl of Sussex (5th creation), 1717
Holland Egerton c. 1689–1730; 4th Baronet	Talbot Yelverton c. 1664–1703/1704; 1st Earl of Sussex, 2nd Viscount Longueville, 16th Baron Grey de Ruthyn
Edward Egerton bef. 1721–1743/1744; 5th Baronet	Thomas Grey Egerton c. 1721–1756; 6th Baronet	George Augustus Yelverton; 1727–1758; 2nd Earl of Sussex, 3rd Viscount de Longueville, 17th Baron Grey de Ruthyn	Henry Yelverton; 1728–1799; 3rd Earl of Sussex, 4th Viscount de Longueville, 18th Baron Grey de Ruthyn
Earldom of Sussex (5th creation) and Viscountcy de Longueville (1st creation) extinct, 1799
Baron Grosvenor of Eaton in the County of Chester, 1761 Earl Gosvenor and Viscount Belgrave of Belgrave in the County of Chester, 1784	Baron Grey de Wilton (2nd creation), 1784 Earl of Wilton and Viscount Grey de Wilton, 1801
Richard Grosvenor; 1731–1802; 7th Baronet of Eaton, 1st Earl Grosvenor, etc.	Thomas Egerton; 1749–1814; 7th Baronet of Egerton and Oulton, 1st Earl of Wilton, etc.	Barbara Yelverton d. 1781
Barony Grey de Wilton (2nd creation) extinct, 1784
Marquess of Westminster, 1831
Robert Grosvenor; 1767–1845; 1st Marquess of Westminster, 2nd Earl Grosvenor, etc.	Eleanor Egerton; 1770–1846	Henry Yelverton; 1780–1810; 19th Baron Grey de Ruthyn
Baron Ebury of Ebury Manor in the County of Middlesex, 1857
Richard Grosvenor; 1795–1869; 2nd Marquess of Westminster, 3rd Earl Grosvenor, etc.	Thomas Grosvenor (Egerton); 1799–1882; 2nd Earl of Wilton, etc.	Robert Grosvenor; 1801–1893; 1st Baron Ebury	Barbara Rawdon-Hastings; 1810–1858; 20th Baroness Grey de Ruthyn suo jure	George Augustus Francis Rawdon-Hastings; 1808–1844; Marquess of Hastings
Duke of Westminster, 1874	Baron Stalbridge of Stalbridge in the County of Dorset, 1886	Baron Grey de Radcliffe in the County Palatine of Lancaster, 1875	Barony Grey de Ruthin (Ruthyn) abeyance terminated, 1885
Hugh Lupus Grosvenor; 1825–1899; 1st Duke of Westminster, 3rd Marquess of Westminster, 4th Earl Grosvenor, etc.	Richard de Aquila Grosvenor; 1837–1912; 1st Baron Stalbridge	Arthur Edward Holland Grey Egerton; 1833–1885; 3rd Earl of Wilton, etc., Baron Grey de Radcliffe	Seymour John Grey Egerton; 1839–1898; 4th Earl of Wilton, etc.	Robert Wellesley Grosvenor; 1834–1918; 2nd Baron Ebury	Bertha Lelgarde Clifton; 1835–1887; 22nd Baroness Grey de Ruthyn suo jure	Henry Weysford Charles Plantagenet Rawdon-Hastings; 1842–1868; Marquess of Hastings, Earl of Loudoun, 21st Baron Grey de Ruthyn, Baron Botreaux, Baron Hungerford, Baron de Moleyns, Baron Hastings
Barony Grey de Radcliffe extinct, 1885	Barony Grey de Ruthyn abeyant, 1868
Victor Alexander Grosvenor; 1853–1884 styled Earl Grosvenor	Henry George Grosvenor; 1861–1914	Hugh Grosvenor; 1880–1949; 2nd Baron Stalbridge	Arthur George Egerton; 1863–1915; 5th Earl of Wilton, etc.	Robert Victor Grosvenor; 1868–1921; 3rd Baron Ebury	Ella Cicely Mary Clifton; 1856–1912	Rawdon George Grey Clifton; 1858–1912; 23rd Baron Grey de Ruthyn	Cecil Talbot Clifton; 1862–1934; 24th Baron Grey de Ruthyn
Barony Stalbridge extinct, 1949	Barony Grey de Ruthyn abeyant, 1934
Barony Grey de Ruthyn abeyance terminated, 1940
Hugh Richard Arthur Grosvenor; 1879–1953; 2nd Duke of Westminster, 4th Marquess of Westminster, 5th Earl Grosvenor, etc.	William Grosvenor; 1894–1963; 3rd Duke of Westminster, 5th Marquess of Westminster, 6th Earl Grosvenor, etc.	Hugh William Grosvenor; 1884–1914	Seymour Edward Frederick Egerton; 1896–1927; 6th Earl of Wilton, etc.	Francis Egerton Grosvenor; 1883–1932; 4th Baron Ebury	John Lancelot Wykeham Butler-Bowden; 1883–1963; 25th Baron Grey de Ruthyn
Barony Grey de Ruthyn abeyant, 1963
Gerald Hugh Grosvenor; 1907–1967; 4th Duke of Westminster, 6th Marquess of Westminster, 7th Earl Grosvenor, etc.	Robert George Grosvenor; 1910–1979; 5th Duke of Westminster, 7th Marquess of Westminster, 8th Earl Grosvenor, etc.	Seymour William Arthur John Egerton; 1921–1999; 7th Earl of Wilton, etc.	Robert Grosvenor; 1914–1957; 5th Baron Ebury
Francis Grosvenor; 1934–2026; 8th Earl of Wilton, etc., 6th Baron Ebury	William Wellesley Grosvenor; 1942–2002
Gerald Cavendish Grosvenor; 1951–2016; 6th Duke of Westminster, 8th Marquess of Westminster, 9th Earl Grosvenor, etc.	Julian Francis Martin Grosvenor b. 1959; 9th Earl of Wilton, etc., 7th Baron Ebury and heir presumptive to the Marquessate of Westminster	Alexander Egerton Grosvenor b. 1968 styled Viscount Grey de Wilton
Heir presumtive to the Earldom of Wilton
Hugh Grosvenor b. 1991; 7th Duke of Westminster, 9th Marquess of Westminster, 10th Earl Grosvenor, etc.
Cosima Florence Grosvenor b. 2025
Heir presumptive to the Dukedom of Westminster

== Earls of Sussex; Sixth creation (1874) ==
- Prince Arthur, 1st Duke of Connaught and Strathearn, 1st Earl of Sussex (1850–1942)
  - Prince Arthur of Connaught (1883–1938)
- Alastair Arthur Windsor, 2nd Duke of Connaught and Strathearn, 2nd Earl of Sussex (1914–1943)

== See also ==
- Duke of Sussex
- Earl of Arundel
- Yelverton baronets
- Baron Grey de Ruthyn
