= Bridges baronets =

Extinct baronetcy in the Peerage of the United Kingdom

Escutcheon of the Bridges baronets of Goodneston, Kent (cr.1718), and Bridges, Baron FitzWalter (cr.1868)

The Bridges baronetcy, of Goodnestone in the County of Kent, was created in the Baronetage of Great Britain on 19 April 1718 for Brook Bridges, son of the Treasury official Brook Bridges (1643–1717), Auditor of the imprests.

== History ==
His son the 2nd Baronet died in 1733 as High Sheriff of Kent. His grandson, the 3rd Baronet, represented Kent in the House of Commons.

In 1842, the 5th Baronet, grandson of the 3rd Baronet, unsuccessfully claimed the ancient barony of FitzWalter (which had been in abeyance since 1756) as a descendant of Mary, sister of the 17th Baron FitzWalter. He later sat as a Member of Parliament for Kent East. In 1868 he was created Baron FitzWalter, of Woodham Walter in the County of Essex, in the Peerage of the United Kingdom. The peerage became extinct on his death.

The 5th Baronet was succeeded by his younger brother as 6th Baronet; on whose death the title passed to his first cousin, the 7th Baronet, son of the Rev. Brook Henry Bridges, third son of the 3rd Baronet. When he died this line of the family also failed and the title was passed on to his first cousin, the 8th Baronet, son of the Rev. Brook Edward Bridges, fourth son of the 3rd Baronet. He became a Jesuit missionary in India. He died unmarried and on his death in 1899 the baronetcy became extinct.

The seat of the Bridges family was Goodnestone Park in Kent. The house was built in 1704 by the 1st Baronet, before he held the title.

== Bridges baronets, of Goodneston (1718) ==
- Sir Brook Bridges, 1st Baronet (1679–1728)
- Sir Brook Bridges, 2nd Baronet (1709–1733)
- Sir Brook William Bridges, 3rd Baronet (1733–1791).
- Sir Brook William Bridges, 4th Baronet (1767–1829)
- Sir Brook William Bridges, 5th Baronet (1801–1875) (created Baron FitzWalter in 1868)

=== Baron FitzWalter (1868) ===
- Brook William Bridges, 1st Baron FitzWalter (1801–1875)

=== Bridges baronets, of Goodneston (1718; reverted) ===
- Sir Brook George Bridges, 6th Baronet (1802–1890)
- Sir Thomas Pym Bridges, 7th Baronet (1805–1895)
- Sir George Talbot Bridges, 8th Baronet (1818–1899)

== Extended family ==
After the death of the last Baronet in 1899 the Goodnestone Park house came into the Plumptre family through the marriage of Eleanor Bridges, daughter of the 4th Baronet, to Rev, Henry Western Plumptre. In 1924 the abeyance of the barony of FitzWalter was terminated in favour of the latter's grandson Henry Fitzwalter Plumptre, son of John Bridges Plumptre.

== Family tree ==
Baron FitzWalter, Viscount FitzWalter, Earl FitzWalter, Viscount Harwich and Earl of Sussex (2nd creation)

Baron FitzWalter, 1295
Robert FitzWalter; 1247–1326; 1st Baron FitzWalter [1295–1326]
Robert FitzWalter; 1300–1328; 2nd Baron FitzWalter
John FitzWalter before 1315–1361; 3rd Baron FitzWalter
Walter FitzWalter; 1345–1386; 4th Baron FitzWalter
Walter FitzWalter; 1368–1406; 5th Baron FitzWalter
Humphrey FitzWalter; 1398–1415; 6th Baron FitzWalter	Walter FitzWalter; 1400–1431; 7th Baron FitzWalter
Elizabeth FitzWalter; 1430–1485; 8th Baroness FitzWalter	John Radcliffe (d. 28 March 1461)
John Radcliffe; 1451–1496; 9th Baron FitzWalter
Viscount FitzWalter, 1525; Earl of Sussex (2nd creation), 1529
Robert Radcliffe; 1483–1542; 1st Earl of Sussex, etc., 10th Baron FitzWalter [1525–1542]
Henry Radcliffe; 1507–1557; 2nd Earl of Sussex, etc., 11th Baron FitzWalter [1542–1557]	Humphrey Radcliffe d. 1566
Thomas Radcliffe c. 1525–1583; 3rd Earl of Sussex, etc., 12th Baron FitzWalter [1557–1583]	Henry Radcliffe c. 1530–1593; 4th Earl of Sussex, etc., 13th Baron FitzWalter [1583–1593]	Frances Radcliffe d. 1602	Thomas Mildmay d. 1608	Edward Radcliffe; 1559–1643; 6th Earl of Sussex, etc. [1629–1643]
Earldom of Sussex and Viscountcy of FitzWalter extinct, 1643
Robert Radcliffe; 1573–1629; 5th Earl of Sussex, etc., 14th Baron FitzWalter [1593–1629]	Henry Mildmay c. 1585–1654 de jure 15th Baron FitzWalter
Barony of FitzWalter dormant, 1629
Robert Mildmay d. 1646
Henry Mildmay d. 1662 de jure 16th Baron FitzWalter	Benjamin Mildmay c. 1646–1679; 17th Baron FitzWalter de jure [1662–1667], confirmed [1667–1679]	Mary Mildmay; 1637–1715	Henry Mildmay (d. 13 December 1692)
Earl FitzWalter and Viscount Harwich, 1730	Bridges Baronets of Goodnestone, County Kent, 1718
Charles Mildmay (1670–d. 1727/1728); 18th Baron FitzWalter	Benjamin Mildmay; 1672–1756; 1st Earl FitzWalter and Viscount Harwich, 19th Baron FitzWalter [1730–1756]	Frederica Schomberg; 1687–1751 formerly Countess of Holderness	Frances Mildmay; 1666–1705	Christopher Fowler	Brook Bridges; 1679–1728; 1st Baronet [1718–1728]
Earldom of FitzWalter, Viscountcy of Harwich extinct and FitzWalter Barony (1295 creation) extinct, 1756
Edmund Fowler c. 1701–1751	Brook Bridges; 1709–1733; 2nd Baronet [1728–1733]
Fanny Fowler; 1746–1825	Brook William Bridges; 1733–1791; 3rd Baronet
Brook William Bridges; 1767–1829; 4th Baronet	Reverend Brook Henry; 1769–1855	Reverend Brook Edward Bridges
Baron FitzWalter of Woodham Walter, County Kent, 1868
Brook William Bridges; 1801–1875; 1st Baron FitzWalter, 5th Baronet [1868–1875]	Brook George Bridges; 1802–1890; 6th Baronet [1875–1890]	Eleanor Bridges; 1805–1892	Reverend Henry Western Plumptre d. 1863	Thomas Pym Bridges; 1805–1895; 7th Baronet [1890–1895]	George Talbot Bridges; 1818–1899; 8th Baronet [1895–1899]
FitzWalter Barony of Woodham Walter, County Kent extinct, 1875	Bridges Baronetcy extinct, 1899
John Bridges Plumptre; 1832–1888	Elizabeth Wright; 1835–1909
Baron FitzWalter (1295 creation) abeyance terminated, 1924
Henry FitzWalter Plumptre; 1860–1932; 20th Baron FitzWalter [1924–1932]	George Beresford Plumptre; 1869–1934
Baron FitzWalter (1295 creation) abeyant, 1932
Baron FitzWalter (1295 creation) abeyance terminated, 1953
FitzWalter Brook Plumptre; 1914–2004; 21st Baron FitzWalter [1953–2004]
Julian Brook Plumptre b. 1952; 22nd Baron FitzWalter [2004–present]
Edward Brook Plumptre b. 1989

== See also ==
- Baron FitzWalter

Baronetage of Great Britain
Preceded by Elton baronets	Bridges baronets of Goodneston; 19 April 1718	Succeeded by Blackwell baronets
