= Brook Bridges =

Brook Bridges may refer to:

- Sir Brook Bridges, 1st Baronet (1679–1728), British barrister
- Sir Brook Bridges, 2nd Baronet (1709–1733), of the Bridges baronets
- Sir Brook Bridges, 3rd Baronet (1733–1791), British MP for Kent
- Sir Brook William Bridges, 4th Baronet (1767–1829), of the Bridges baronets
- Brook Bridges, 1st Baron FitzWalter (1801–1875), British MP for Kent East
- Sir Brook George Bridges, 6th Baronet (1802–1890), of the Bridges baronets

== See also ==
- Bridges (surname)
