= Goodnestone Park =

Historical home and garden in Dover, Kent

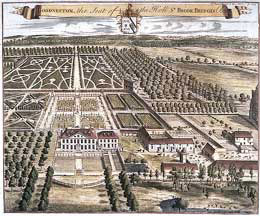
- Plan of Goodnestone Park immediately after the house was built

- Location within Kent

General information
- Location: The Street, Goodnestone, Kent, England
- Coordinates: 51.243611°N 1.226944°E
- Completed: 1704

Goodnestone Park is a stately home and gardens in the southern part of the village of Goodnestone, Dover, Kent. It is approximately 7 miles (11 km) from Canterbury. The Palladian house was built in 1704 by Brook Bridges, 1st Baronet. His great-granddaughter Elizabeth married Jane Austen's brother, and Austen visited them on the estate regularly. Goodnestone House is a Grade II* listed building, enlisted on 13 October 1952. The 15 acres (6.1 ha) gardens are considered to be amongst the finest in southeastern England. Previously the seat of the Bridges Baronets, it is now owned by their heirs, the Barons FitzWalter.

== History ==
Although the modern-day Goodnestone House was built in 1704 by Brook Bridges, 1st Baronet, the estate was occupied during Tudor times. In 1560, Sir Thomas Engeham purchased the estate and lived in a manor house on the property. The manor was abandoned by his descendants during the reign of Anne, Queen of Great Britain, and the estate was sold to the Bridges family who had departed from their previous property at Grove House in Fulham, Middlesex. Brook Bridges, 1st Baronet evidently demolished the original manor and ordered the construction of a new palladian house. The date of the house is etched onto a brick on the main front.

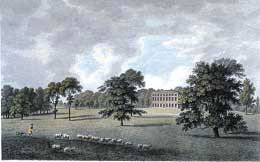
Goodnestone Park in the 1770s

Not long after the house was built, extensive formal gardens developed around the house, the brainchild of William Harris. However, Sir Brook Bridges, 3rd Baronet (the grandson of Brook Bridges, 1st Baronet) replaced the gardens at the end of the 18th century with a landscape park and made several alterations to the house. He married Fanny Fowler and had a daughter, Elizabeth, who married Edward Austen, brother of the famous author Jane Austen. The young couple stayed at Rowling house on the estate for several years before moving to nearby Godmersham and Jane was a regular guest at Goodnestone. It was after staying at Rowling House in 1796 that she began writing her novel Pride and Prejudice, originally named First Impressions.

In the 1840s, Sir Brook Bridges, 5th Baronet made alterations to the house, adding a grand portico and a new approach drive with a series of terraced lawns with central flights of steps. He terraced the lawns and built a wall between the house and the park.

After the death of the 6th baronet in 1890, he was succeeded in the baronetcy by a cousin, and after the death of the 8th baronet in 1899, the line became extinct. The Goodnestone estate passed to the family of the sister of the 6th baronet, Eleanor Bridges, who had married the Reverend Henry Western Plumptre in 1828. Their eldest son, John Bridges Plumptre, attempted to reclaim the ancient barony of FitzWalter through his descent (through the Bridges family) from Mary Mildmay, sister of the 17th Baron. Although the claim was not accepted; his son, Henry FitzWalter Plumptre, did manage to prove senior descent, succeeding to the title as 20th Lord FitzWalter in 1924. As he died childless, he was succeeded in the barony by his nephew, Brook FitzWalter Plumptre.

In the 1920s and 1930s, Emmy FitzWalter, Brook FitzWalter's aunt, further developed the gardens, adding a woodland garden with rockwork and a pool amongst other features. However, during World War II the house was used by the British army and by 1955 the gardens had fallen into an unkempt state. Adding to the degradation, in 1959, a fire destroyed the roof and upper two storeys of the house which took a whole 18 months to restore. Lord FitzWalter's agent had advised him to opt for a modern house but the FitzWalters were adamant that it be restored to its former glory. It was not until the mid-1960s that Margaret FitzWalter restored the gardens.

== Architecture ==
=== Exterior ===
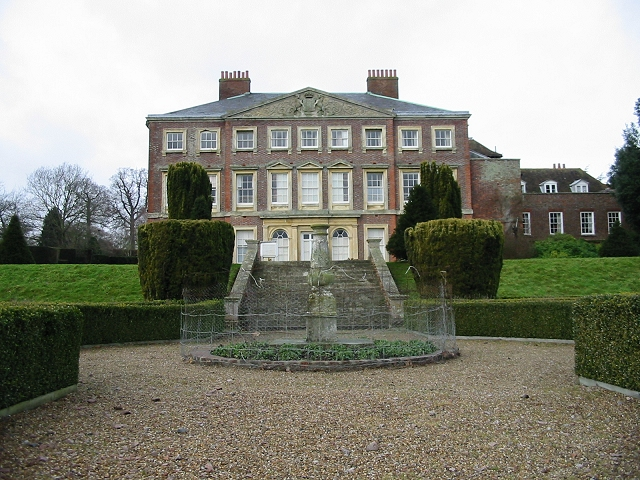
Goodnestone House, 27 December 2007

Goodnestone House is a Grade II* listed red and blue brick palladian house, enlisted on 13 October 1952. The original house, as built in 1704, was a two-storey building. However, significant alterations were made around 1790 when a 3rd floor was added with plinth, plat band and cornice to the hipped roof with stacks to left and to right. Between 1838 and 1844 further changes were made by the partnership of Thomas Rickman and R.C. Hussey and by Sir Brook Bridges, 5th Baronet. The house has nine bays, the central 5th bay projecting with pediment. On the top floor are nine half-sized glazing bar sashes on top floor, and 6 full sized on the first and ground floors. The grand porch features Greek Doric columns, with solid side walls, adding during the development phase in the early 1840s. The original entrance to the house was on its eastern side. The eastern side also features 9 bays with glazing bar sashes and heavy stone surrounds with the protruding central 5th bay emblazoned with arms of Sir Brook Bridges in 1842. To the northern side there are 2 storeys with an attic with plinth, plat band and parapet to hipped roof, with 3 pedimented dormers and rear stack. On both the northern and southern side of the house is a large pilaster strip buttress and shallow canted bay.

=== Interior ===
Inside, Goodnestone House has a prominent main staircase located in the large hallway, with open string, enriched brackets, and paired balusters. They are square newels and column-type balusters on half-landings, with a swept and ramped handrail and dado panelling. The 3 eastern rooms of the property are believed to have been designed by Robert Mylne around 1770 with a central oval entrance hall with niches.

== Gardens ==
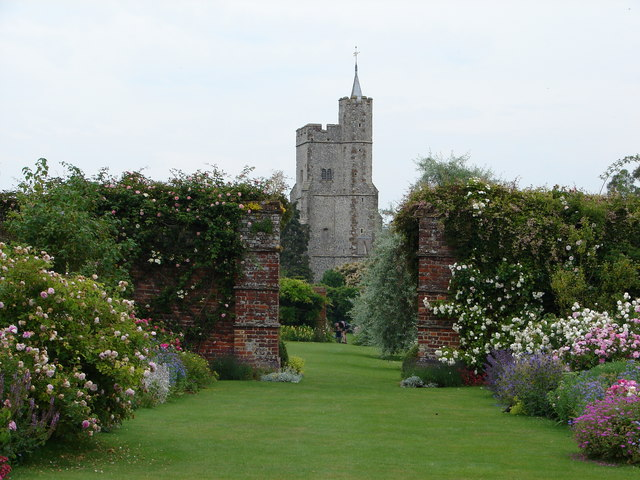
View of Goodnestone Church from the rose garden of Goodnestone Park

The park is famous for its sprawling gardens which cover an area of approximately 15 acres (61,000 m^{2}) around the house. The gardens are considered to be one of the finest in the southeast of England. It is one of only three gardens in Kent to be awarded the prestigious two stars in the Good Garden Guide. In a survey conducted by The Daily Telegraph it was voted Britain's sixth favourite garden in and was a finalist in the 2009 Country Life Awards. The box parterre in the garden was planted to celebrate the millennium and the gravel garden was planted in 2003. Beyond this is a Golden Arboretum which planted in 2001 to commemorate the Golden Wedding of Lord and Lady FitzWalter. The walled garden contains roses, wisteria, clematis, jasmine and a water feature. Fruit, vegetables and herbs grow in the kitchen garden and there is also an ornamental greenhouse.

The soil is slightly alkaline over chalk, typical of the North Downs. More acidic greensand in the woodland garden permits the growth of rhododendrons and other ericaceous plants. Today the gardens are maintained by Paul Bagshaw and three female gardeners. The gardens are open to the public from late March to early October, and on Sundays from mid-February.
