= Baron FitzWalter =

Title in the Peerage of England

- Or, a fess between two chevrons gules
- Creation date: 24 June 1295
- Created by: Edward I
- Peerage: Peerage of England
- First holder: Robert FitzWalter
- Present holder: Julian Plumptre, 22nd Baron FitzWalter
- Heir apparent: Hon. Edward Brook Plumptre
- Seat: Goodnestone Park
- Motto: Je Garderai ("I will guard")

Baron FitzWalter is an ancient title in the Peerage of England. It was created on 24 June 1295 for Robert FitzWalter. The title was created by writ, which means that it can descend through both male and female lines.

== History ==
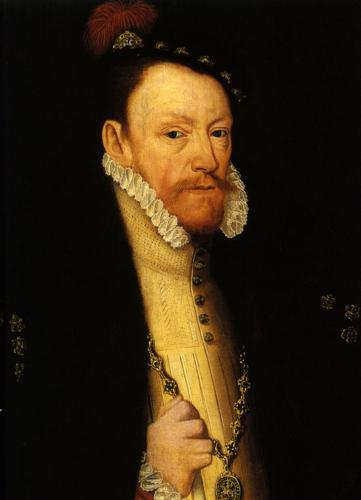
Thomas Radclyffe, 3rd Earl of Sussex and 12th Baron FitzWalter

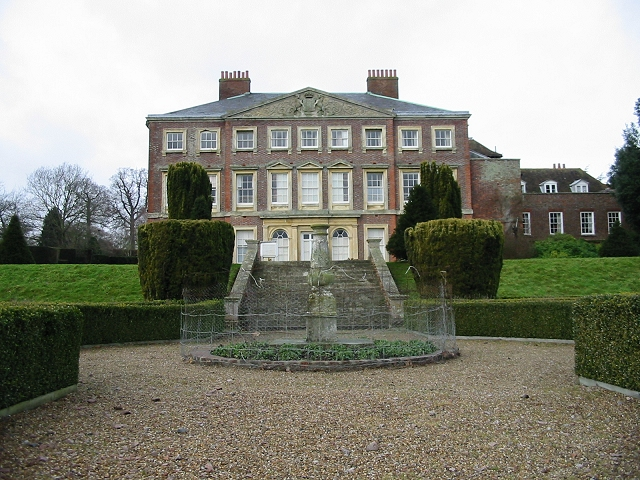
Goodnestone House, Kent

One of the oldest titles in the English Peerage, the barony of FitzWalter has a long history. The fourth baron was an Admiral of the Fleet. The fourth baron's grandson, the sixth baron, died from dysentery at the siege of Harfleur. He was succeeded by his brother, the seventh baron, who was the last known male line descendant of Rollo of Normandy, and was succeeded by his daughter and only child, Elizabeth. She was the wife of John Radcliffe. Their son, the ninth baron, was attainted for treason in 1495 with his title forfeited. However, his son Robert Radcliffe obtained a reversal of the attainder by Act of Parliament in 1509 and later served as Lord Lieutenant of Lancashire. He was created by Viscount FitzWalter in 1525 and Earl of Sussex in 1529. His grandson, the third earl, was summoned to the House of Lords through a writ of acceleration in 1553 in his father's junior title of Baron FitzWalter. Lord Sussex later served as Lord Deputy of Ireland. He was succeeded by his younger brother, the fourth earl. He had earlier represented Maldon, Hampshire and Portsmouth in the House of Commons and also served as Lord Lieutenant of Hampshire. When he died the titles passed to his only child, the fifth earl. He was Lord Lieutenant of Essex.

On his death in 1629, the barony of FitzWalter separated from the viscountcy and earldom. The latter titles were inherited by the late earl's cousin and heir male, the sixth earl, who notably sat as a Member of Parliament for Petersfield, Bedford and Portsmouth. When he died in 1643 the viscountcy and earldom became extinct. The claim to the barony of FitzWalter was passed on to the fifth earl's cousin and heir-general Henry Mildmay, de jure fifteenth baron. He was the son of Lady Frances, the only daughter of the second earl of Sussex by his second wife, Anne Calthorpe. He claimed the barony in 1641 and 1645 but was unsuccessful both times and was never summoned to the House of Lords. His grandson Henry Mildmay, de jure sixteenth baron, successfully claimed the title in 1660. However, his younger brother Benjamin Mildmay successfully petitioned for the peerage in 1667 and was summoned to the House of Lords as the seventeenth baron. In 1730 his younger son, the nineteenth baron, was created Viscount Harwich, in the County of Essex, and Earl FitzWalter, in the Peerage of Great Britain. Lord FitzWalter later served as President of the Board of Trade and was also Lord Lieutenant of Essex.

However, on his death in 1756, the viscountcy and earldom became extinct while the barony of FitzWalter fell into abeyance between the daughters of Mary, only sister of the sixteenth and seventeenth barons. The peerage remained in abeyance for 168 years, until it was called out of abeyance in 1924 (after a petition to the House of Lords) in favour of Henry Fitzwalter Plumptre, who became the twentieth baron. He was the son of John Bridges Plumptre and grandson of Eleanor, wife of Reverend Henry Western Plumptre and daughter of Sir Brook William Bridges, 4th Baronet, of Goodneston, a descendant of the aforementioned Mary, sister of the sixteenth and seventeenth barons. Sir Brook William Bridge's eldest son Sir Brook William Bridges, 5th Baronet, of Goodneston, had unsuccessfully claimed the barony in 1842, but was instead created Baron FitzWalter, of Woodham Walter in the County of Essex, in 1868 (for more information on this creation, which became extinct in 1875, see Bridges baronets of Goodneston).

The twentieth baron died childless in 1932 when the peerage once again fell into abeyance. The abeyance was terminated in 1953 in favour of Fitzwalter Brook Plumptre, the twenty-first Baron. He was the son of George Beresford Plumptre, the younger brother of the twentieth baron. As of 2017, the title is held by his son, the twenty-second Baron, who succeeded in 2004.

The family seat is Goodnestone Park. The house was built in 1704 by Sir Brook Bridges, 1st Baronet, of Goodneston. The house came into the Plumptre family through the marriage of the aforesaid Eleanor Bridges, daughter of Sir Brook William Bridges, 4th Baronet, of Goodneston, to Reverend Henry Western Plumptre, whose son John Bridges Plumptre inherited it upon the death of the last Bridges baronet of Goodneston in 1899.

The FitzWalters were of the same line as the de Clare. Presuming they were from an unbroken male line, the seventh baron was the last agnate of the House of Normandy. Through de Balliol they also have a connection to the old Saxon line in England.

== Baron FitzWalter (1295) ==
- Robert FitzWalter, 1st Baron FitzWalter (1247–1325)
- Robert FitzWalter (c. 1297–1328), 2nd Baron FitzWalter by modern usage
- John FitzWalter, 2nd (or 3rd) Baron FitzWalter, son of previous (c. 1315–1361)
- Walter FitzWalter, 3rd (or 4th) Baron FitzWalter (1345–1386), son of previous
- Walter FitzWalter, 4th (or 5th) Baron FitzWalter (1368–1406), son of previous
- Humphrey FitzWalter (1398–1415), (suo jure) 6th Baron FitzWalter by modern usage (never summoned to parl.), son of previous
- Walter FitzWalter, 5th (or 7th) Baron FitzWalter (1400–1431), brother of previous
- Elizabeth FitzWalter (1430–1485), suo jure 8th Baroness FitzWalter, daughter of previous, wife of Sir John Radcliffe of Attleborough
- John Radcliffe, 6th (or 9th) Baron FitzWalter (1452?–1496), son of previous
- Robert Radcliffe, 7th (or 10th) Baron FitzWalter (d. 1542), son of the 6th/9th baron, restored 1506 (created Viscount FitzWalter 1525)

=== Viscount FitzWalter (1525) ===
Arms of Radcliffe: Argent, a bend engrailed sable

- Robert Radcliffe, 1st Viscount FitzWalter, 10th Baron FitzWalter (d. 1542) (created Earl of Sussex in 1529)

=== Earl of Sussex (1529) ===
- Robert Radcliffe, 1st Earl of Sussex, 1st Viscount FitzWalter, 10th Baron FitzWalter (d. 1542)
- Henry Radclyffe, 2nd Earl of Sussex, 2nd Viscount FitzWalter, 11th Baron FitzWalter (c. 1506–1557)
- Thomas Radclyffe, 3rd Earl of Sussex, 3rd Viscount FitzWalter, 12th Baron FitzWalter (c. 1525–1583)
- Henry Radclyffe, 4th Earl of Sussex, 4th Viscount FitzWalter, 13th Baron FitzWalter (c. 1530–1593)
- Robert Radclyffe, 5th Earl of Sussex, 5th Viscount FitzWalter, 14th Baron FitzWalter (d. 1629) (barony dormant)
- Edward Radclyffe, 6th Earl of Sussex, 6th Viscount FitzWalter (1559–1643) (never Baron FitzWalter)

=== Baron FitzWalter (1295; reverted) ===
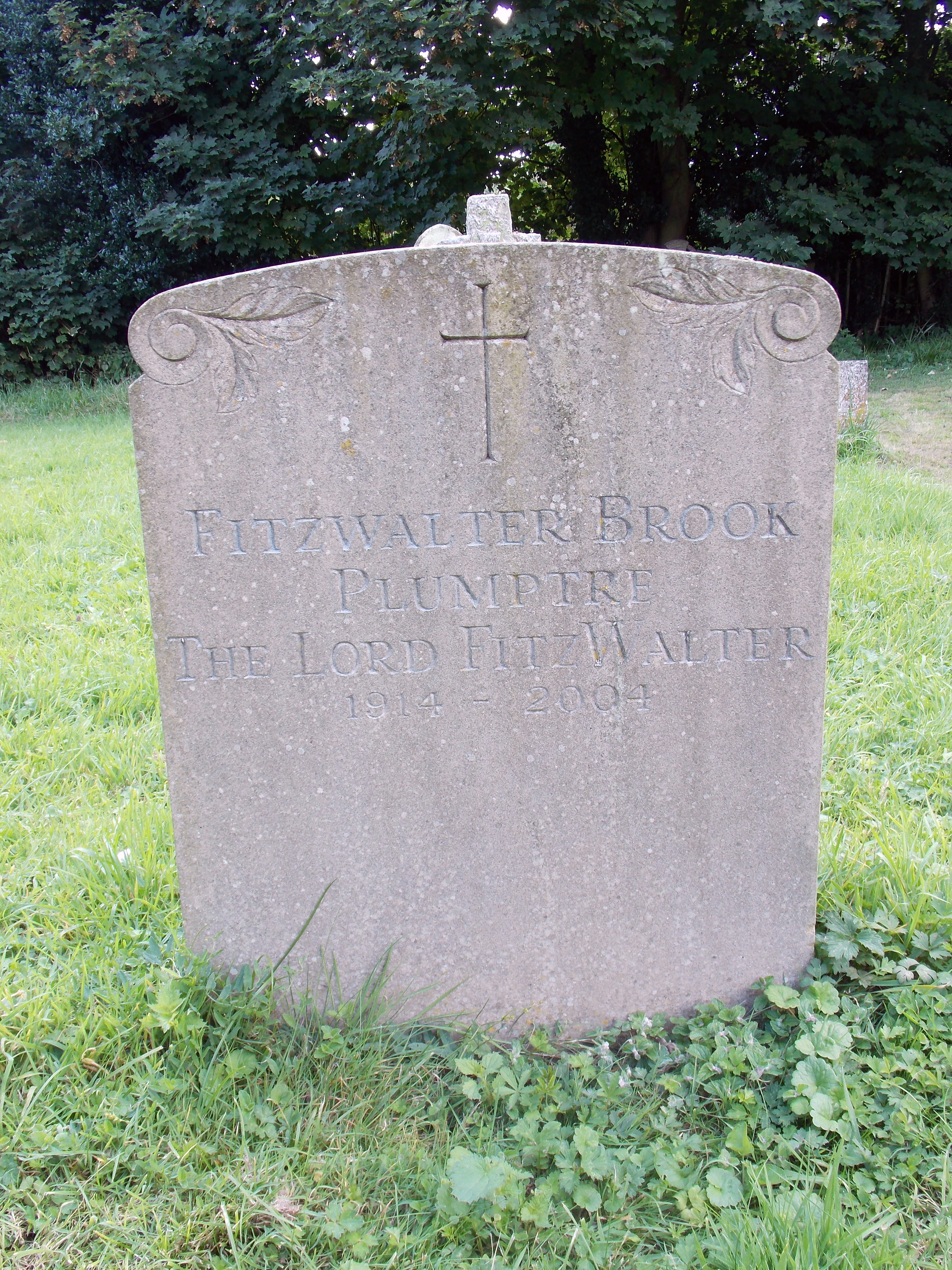
Headstone to Fitzwalter Brook Plumptre in the cemetery of the Church of the Holy Cross, Goodnestone, Kent

- Henry Mildmay, de jure 15th Baron FitzWalter (c. 1585–1654)
- Henry Mildmay, de jure 16th Baron FitzWalter (d. 1662)
- Benjamin Mildmay, 17th Baron FitzWalter (c. 1646–1679) (confirmed 1667)
- Charles Mildmay, 18th Baron FitzWalter (1670–1728)
- Benjamin Mildmay, 19th Baron FitzWalter (1672–1756) (created Earl FitzWalter in 1730)

=== Earl FitzWalter (1730) ===
- Benjamin Mildmay, 1st Earl FitzWalter, 19th Baron FitzWalter (1672–1756) (barony abeyant 1756)

=== Barons FitzWalter (1295; reverted) ===
- Henry Fitzwalter Plumptre, 20th Baron FitzWalter (1860–1932) (abeyance terminated 1924; abeyant 1932)
- Fitzwalter Brook Plumptre, 21st Baron FitzWalter (1914–2004) (abeyance terminated 1953)
- Julian Brook Plumptre, 22nd Baron FitzWalter (b. 1952)

The heir apparent is the present holder's son, Hon. Edward Brook Plumptre (b. 1989).

== Barons FitzWalter (1868) ==
- see Bridges baronets of Goodneston

== Family tree ==
Baron FitzWalter, Viscount FitzWalter, Earl FitzWalter, Viscount Harwich and Earl of Sussex (2nd creation)

Baron FitzWalter, 1295
Robert FitzWalter; 1247–1326; 1st Baron FitzWalter [1295–1326]
Robert FitzWalter; 1300–1328; 2nd Baron FitzWalter
John FitzWalter before 1315–1361; 3rd Baron FitzWalter
Walter FitzWalter; 1345–1386; 4th Baron FitzWalter
Walter FitzWalter; 1368–1406; 5th Baron FitzWalter
Humphrey FitzWalter; 1398–1415; 6th Baron FitzWalter	Walter FitzWalter; 1400–1431; 7th Baron FitzWalter
Elizabeth FitzWalter; 1430–1485; 8th Baroness FitzWalter	John Radcliffe (d. 28 March 1461)
John Radcliffe; 1451–1496; 9th Baron FitzWalter
Viscount FitzWalter, 1525; Earl of Sussex (2nd creation), 1529
Robert Radcliffe; 1483–1542; 1st Earl of Sussex, etc., 10th Baron FitzWalter [1525–1542]
Henry Radcliffe; 1507–1557; 2nd Earl of Sussex, etc., 11th Baron FitzWalter [1542–1557]	Humphrey Radcliffe d. 1566
Thomas Radcliffe c. 1525–1583; 3rd Earl of Sussex, etc., 12th Baron FitzWalter [1557–1583]	Henry Radcliffe c. 1530–1593; 4th Earl of Sussex, etc., 13th Baron FitzWalter [1583–1593]	Frances Radcliffe d. 1602	Thomas Mildmay d. 1608	Edward Radcliffe; 1559–1643; 6th Earl of Sussex, etc. [1629–1643]
Earldom of Sussex and Viscountcy of FitzWalter extinct, 1643
Robert Radcliffe; 1573–1629; 5th Earl of Sussex, etc., 14th Baron FitzWalter [1593–1629]	Henry Mildmay c. 1585–1654 de jure 15th Baron FitzWalter
Barony of FitzWalter dormant, 1629
Robert Mildmay d. 1646
Henry Mildmay d. 1662 de jure 16th Baron FitzWalter	Benjamin Mildmay c. 1646–1679; 17th Baron FitzWalter de jure [1662–1667], confirmed [1667–1679]	Mary Mildmay; 1637–1715	Henry Mildmay (d. 13 December 1692)
Earl FitzWalter and Viscount Harwich, 1730	Bridges Baronets of Goodnestone, County Kent, 1718
Charles Mildmay (1670–d. 1727/1728); 18th Baron FitzWalter	Benjamin Mildmay; 1672–1756; 1st Earl FitzWalter and Viscount Harwich, 19th Baron FitzWalter [1730–1756]	Frederica Schomberg; 1687–1751 formerly Countess of Holderness	Frances Mildmay; 1666–1705	Christopher Fowler	Brook Bridges; 1679–1728; 1st Baronet [1718–1728]
Earldom of FitzWalter, Viscountcy of Harwich extinct and FitzWalter Barony (1295 creation) extinct, 1756
Edmund Fowler c. 1701–1751	Brook Bridges; 1709–1733; 2nd Baronet [1728–1733]
Fanny Fowler; 1746–1825	Brook William Bridges; 1733–1791; 3rd Baronet
Brook William Bridges; 1767–1829; 4th Baronet	Reverend Brook Henry; 1769–1855	Reverend Brook Edward Bridges
Baron FitzWalter of Woodham Walter, County Kent, 1868
Brook William Bridges; 1801–1875; 1st Baron FitzWalter, 5th Baronet [1868–1875]	Brook George Bridges; 1802–1890; 6th Baronet [1875–1890]	Eleanor Bridges; 1805–1892	Reverend Henry Western Plumptre d. 1863	Thomas Pym Bridges; 1805–1895; 7th Baronet [1890–1895]	George Talbot Bridges; 1818–1899; 8th Baronet [1895–1899]
FitzWalter Barony of Woodham Walter, County Kent extinct, 1875	Bridges Baronetcy extinct, 1899
John Bridges Plumptre; 1832–1888	Elizabeth Wright; 1835–1909
Baron FitzWalter (1295 creation) abeyance terminated, 1924
Henry FitzWalter Plumptre; 1860–1932; 20th Baron FitzWalter [1924–1932]	George Beresford Plumptre; 1869–1934
Baron FitzWalter (1295 creation) abeyant, 1932
Baron FitzWalter (1295 creation) abeyance terminated, 1953
FitzWalter Brook Plumptre; 1914–2004; 21st Baron FitzWalter [1953–2004]
Julian Brook Plumptre b. 1952; 22nd Baron FitzWalter [2004–present]
Edward Brook Plumptre b. 1989
