= Listed buildings in Goodnestone, Dover =

Historic structures in Kent, England

Goodnestone is a village and civil parish in the Dover District of Kent, England. It contains 73 listed buildings that are recorded in the National Heritage List for England. Of these three are grade I, seven are grade II* and 63 are grade II.

This list is based on the information retrieved online from Historic England.

== Key ==
Grade	Criteria
I	Buildings that are of exceptional interest
II*	Particularly important buildings of more than special interest
II	Buildings that are of special interest

== Listing ==
Name	Grade	Location	Type	Completed (Note: The date given is the date used by Historic England as significant for the initial building or that of an important part in the structure's description.)	Date designated	Grid ref. (Note: The grid reference is based on the British national grid reference system, sometimes known as OSGB36, used by the Ordnance Survey.) Geo-coordinates	Notes	Entry number (Note: The "List Entry Number" is a unique number assigned to each listed building and scheduled monument by Historic England.)	Image	Wikidata
Stable Range to Rear of Uffington Court	II	Adisham			3 December 1986	TR2428054734; 51°14′52″N 1°12′44″E		1070279	Upload Photo	Q26324004
Uffington Court	II	Adisham			3 December 1986	TR2430154722; 51°14′51″N 1°12′45″E		1363245	Upload Photo	Q26645082
Bonnington Cottage	II	Bonnington			11 October 1963	TR2511753900; 51°14′23″N 1°13′25″E		1363246	Upload Photo	Q26645083
Bonnington Farmhouse	II	Bonnington			11 October 1963	TR2511253881; 51°14′23″N 1°13′25″E		1070280	Upload Photo	Q26324006
Gate Lodge	II	Bonnington			3 December 1986	TR2511153941; 51°14′25″N 1°13′25″E		1070281	Upload Photo	Q26324008
Chillenden Forge	II	Canterbury, CT3 1PS			3 December 1986	TR2686653703; 51°14′15″N 1°14′55″E		1363249	Upload Photo	Q26645086
Park Cottage	II	Canterbury, CT3 1QF			5 July 2018	TR2571654738; 51°14′50″N 1°13′58″E		1458032	Upload Photo	Q66479797
Claypits	II	Cave Lane			3 December 1986	TR2593355232; 51°15′05″N 1°14′10″E		1123719	Upload Photo	Q26416814
Claypits Farm	II	Cave Lane			3 December 1986	TR2595355219; 51°15′05″N 1°14′11″E		1363247	Upload Photo	Q26645084
The Old Malthouse	II	Cave Lane			13 May 1986	TR2590355224; 51°15′05″N 1°14′09″E		1337668	Upload Photo	Q26622062
Barn About 30 Metres East of Chillenden Court Farm House	II	Chillenden			3 December 1986	TR2691953609; 51°14′11″N 1°14′58″E		1363248	Upload Photo	Q26645085
Chillenden Court Farm House	II	Chillenden			13 October 1952	TR2687753610; 51°14′12″N 1°14′55″E		1123706	Upload Photo	Q26416781
Chillenden Windmill	II*	Chillenden	windmill		11 October 1963	TR2689954238; 51°14′32″N 1°14′58″E		1111765	Chillenden Windmill More images	Q5099027
Church of All Saints	II*	Chillenden	church building		11 October 1963	TR2695753594; 51°14′11″N 1°14′59″E		1070283	Church of All Saints More images	Q17557701
Copmans Hall	II	Chillenden			27 February 1979	TR2654354597; 51°14′44″N 1°14′40″E		1070284	Upload Photo	Q26324012
The Grange	II	Chillenden			11 October 1963	TR2703653745; 51°14′16″N 1°15′04″E		1111772	Upload Photo	Q26405569
The Griffin's Head Inn	II	Chillenden	inn		13 October 1952	TR2710453536; 51°14′09″N 1°15′07″E		1070286	The Griffin's Head Inn More images	Q26324016
The Rectory and Wall Attached	II	Chillenden			3 December 1986	TR2692253668; 51°14′13″N 1°14′58″E		1111768	Upload Photo	Q26405565
The Thatch	II	Chillenden			17 May 1979	TR2683853724; 51°14′15″N 1°14′54″E		1111763	Upload Photo	Q26405562
Wall About 20 Metres South of the Rectory	II	Chillenden			3 December 1986	TR2691253648; 51°14′13″N 1°14′57″E		1070285	Upload Photo	Q26324014
Yew Tree Farmhouse	II	Chillenden			3 December 1986	TR2702553537; 51°14′09″N 1°15′03″E		1070282	Upload Photo	Q26324010
Barn About 150 Metres North West of Knowlton Court	II	Knowlton			3 December 1986	TR2805253490; 51°14′06″N 1°15′56″E		1111873	Upload Photo	Q26405681
Church of St Clement	I	Knowlton	church building		11 October 1963	TR2816053353; 51°14′01″N 1°16′01″E		1111748	Church of St Clement More images	Q7592825
Dovecot About 100 Metres North West of Knowlton Court	II*	Knowlton			11 October 1963	TR2807653394; 51°14′03″N 1°15′57″E		1070289	Upload Photo	Q17557705
Forecourt Garden and Stable Walls to Knowlton Court	II	Knowlton			3 December 1986	TR2806153323; 51°14′01″N 1°15′56″E		1070288	Upload Photo	Q26324017
Knowlton Court	I	Knowlton	English country house		13 October 1952	TR2810953319; 51°14′00″N 1°15′58″E		1336977	Knowlton Court More images	Q6423437
Lodge to Knowlton Court	II	Knowlton			5 June 1973	TR2759353690; 51°14′13″N 1°15′32″E		1070291	Upload Photo	Q26324022
Oasts and Farm Offices About 160 Metres North West of Knowlton Court	II	Knowlton			3 December 1986	TR2801753476; 51°14′06″N 1°15′54″E		1070290	Upload Photo	Q26324019
The Dower House	II*	Knowlton			11 October 1963	TR2799453444; 51°14′05″N 1°15′52″E		1336976	Upload Photo	Q17557855
Wall to Churchyard of St Clement	II	Knowlton			3 December 1986	TR2814553347; 51°14′01″N 1°16′00″E		1070287	Upload Photo	Q73423840
Walled Garden About 20 Metres East of Knowlton Court	II	Knowlton			3 December 1986	TR2815853304; 51°14′00″N 1°16′01″E		1111904	Upload Photo	Q26405724
Barn About 20 Metres East of Rowling House	II	Rowling			3 December 1986	TR2723954834; 51°14′51″N 1°15′17″E		1363250	Upload Photo	Q26645087
Elizabethan Cottage	II	Rowling			3 December 1986	TR2800855216; 51°15′02″N 1°15′57″E		1112554	Upload Photo	Q26406480
Lower Rowling Farmhouse	II	Rowling			3 December 1986	TR2782454946; 51°14′53″N 1°15′47″E		1112549	Upload Photo	Q26406475
Rowling Court	II	Rowling			11 October 1963	TR2761054618; 51°14′43″N 1°15′35″E		1322402	Upload Photo	Q26608214
Rowling House	II	Rowling			11 October 1963	TR2721854874; 51°14′52″N 1°15′16″E		1070292	Upload Photo	Q26324024
Stable Block About 75 Metres West of Rowling House	II	Rowling			3 December 1986	TR2713454888; 51°14′52″N 1°15′12″E		1336966	Upload Photo	Q26621427
Wall About 30 Metres South of Rowling Court	II	Rowling			3 December 1986	TR2760954587; 51°14′42″N 1°15′35″E		1070293	Upload Photo	Q26324026
Wall and Railings About 35 Metres East of Lower Rowling Farmhouse	II	Rowling			3 December 1986	TR2786054928; 51°14′53″N 1°15′49″E		1363211	Upload Photo	Q26645048
North Corner	II	1 and 2, Saddler's Hill			3 December 1986	TR2556454949; 51°14′57″N 1°13′51″E		1336988	Upload Photo	Q26621445
Hop View	II	Saddler's Hill			3 December 1986	TR2559854978; 51°14′58″N 1°13′53″E		1070294	Upload Photo	Q26324027
Ivy House	II	Saddler's Hill			3 December 1986	TR2558054899; 51°14′55″N 1°13′52″E		1363212	Upload Photo	Q26645049
Yew Tree Farmhouse	II	Saddler's Hill			13 October 1952	TR2567054808; 51°14′52″N 1°13′56″E		1336991	Upload Photo	Q26685030
Knowlton War Memorial	II	Sandwich Road, Knowlton, Cantebury, CT3 1PT	war memorial		19 April 2023	TR2749553612; 51°14′11″N 1°15′27″E		1485243	Knowlton War Memorial More images	Q94131948
Avenue Lodge	II	School Lane			26 July 2000	TR2546754653; 51°14′47″N 1°13′45″E		1381208	Upload Photo	Q26661331
Barn About 15 Metres South East of Little Twitham Farm Cottage	II	Staple Road			3 December 1986	TR2621656566; 51°15′48″N 1°14′28″E		1363213	Upload Photo	Q26645050
Little Twitham Farm Cottage	II	Staple Road			3 December 1986	TR2620256588; 51°15′49″N 1°14′27″E		1070295	Upload Photo	Q26324029
Oasts About 50 Metres South of Little Twitham Farmhouse	II	Staple Road			3 December 1986	TR2617356524; 51°15′47″N 1°14′26″E		1337014	Upload Photo	Q26621470
Oast Cottages	II	1, 2, 3 and 4, The Street			14 February 1975	TR2555054590; 51°14′45″N 1°13′49″E		1349033	Upload Photo	Q26632356
Church Cottages	II	The Street			3 December 1986	TR2553354611; 51°14′46″N 1°13′48″E		1070260	Upload Photo	Q26323969
Church of the Holy Cross	I	The Street	church building		11 October 1963	TR2547454583; 51°14′45″N 1°13′45″E		1070258	Church of the Holy Cross More images	Q17529733
Estate Buildings About 30 Metres North of Goodnestone Park	II	The Street			3 December 1986	TR2537454384; 51°14′39″N 1°13′40″E		1070255	Upload Photo	Q26323962
Flight of Steps About 10 Metres South East of Goodnestone Park	II	The Street			3 December 1986	TR2536154314; 51°14′36″N 1°13′39″E		1186865	Upload Photo	Q26482107
Forge Cottage	II	The Street			3 December 1986	TR2556854678; 51°14′48″N 1°13′50″E		1363236	Upload Photo	Q26645073
Gate Piers About 20 Metres South West and Wall to Churchyard of Holy Cross	II	The Street			3 December 1986	TR2543854576; 51°14′45″N 1°13′43″E		1070259	Upload Photo	Q26323966
Goodnestone Park	II*	The Street	botanical garden		13 October 1952	TR2533754342; 51°14′37″N 1°13′38″E		1070296	Goodnestone Park More images	Q5583496
Goodnestone Village Hall	II	The Street			3 December 1986	TR2556954690; 51°14′48″N 1°13′50″E		1099231	Upload Photo	Q26391385
Ha-ha About 45 Metres South East of Goodnestone Park	II	The Street			3 December 1986	TR2537254330; 51°14′37″N 1°13′40″E		1070297	Upload Photo	Q26324032
Hazel Bank	II	The Street			3 December 1986	TR2564554784; 51°14′51″N 1°13′55″E		1099202	Upload Photo	Q26391352
Lindley House	II	The Street			3 December 1986	TR2550754527; 51°14′43″N 1°13′47″E		1363234	Upload Photo	Q26645070
School House	II	The Street			3 December 1986	TR2555754665; 51°14′48″N 1°13′50″E		1070261	Upload Photo	Q26323971
Stable Block About 20 Metres South of the Dower House	II	The Street			3 December 1986	TR2544454448; 51°14′41″N 1°13′43″E		1363233	Upload Photo	Q26645069
The Cottage	II	The Street			3 December 1986	TR2560054745; 51°14′50″N 1°13′52″E		1099194	Upload Photo	Q26391345
The Dower House	II*	The Street			13 October 1952	TR2542354478; 51°14′42″N 1°13′42″E		1070257	Upload Photo	Q17557684
The Fitzwalter Arms	II	The Street	pub		3 December 1986	TR2552054587; 51°14′45″N 1°13′48″E		1363235	The Fitzwalter Arms More images	Q26645072
The Gabriel Richards Almshouses	II*	The Street	almshouse		13 October 1952	TR2566354761; 51°14′50″N 1°13′55″E		1070263	The Gabriel Richards Almshouses More images	Q17557689
The Old Post Office	II	The Street			13 October 1962	TR2563054773; 51°14′51″N 1°13′54″E		1363237	Upload Photo	Q26645074
The Parsonage	II	The Street			13 October 1952	TR2554254538; 51°14′43″N 1°13′49″E		1363238	Upload Photo	Q26645075
Vicarage Cottage	II	The Street			13 October 1952	TR2552354528; 51°14′43″N 1°13′48″E		1099178	Upload Photo	Q26391329
Walled Gardens to North of Goodnestone Park	II	The Street			3 December 1986	TR2537054408; 51°14′39″N 1°13′40″E		1070256	Upload Photo	Q26323964
Weaver's Cottage	II	The Street			3 December 1986	TR2553054637; 51°14′47″N 1°13′48″E		1070262	Upload Photo	Q26323973
West House Cottage	II	The Street			3 December 1986	TR2553154512; 51°14′43″N 1°13′48″E		1070264	Upload Photo	Q26323975
Great Tickenhurst Farmhouse	II	Tickenhurst			3 December 1986	TR2914354686; 51°14′43″N 1°16′55″E		1070265	Upload Photo	Q26323977

== See also ==
- Grade I listed buildings in Kent
- Grade II* listed buildings in Kent

== Sources ==
- Newman, John (2013) [1969], Kent: North-East and East, The Buildings of England, New Haven and London: Yale University Press, ISBN 978-0-300-18506-5
