= John FitzWalter, 2nd Baron FitzWalter =

English baron and gang leader (c. 1315–1361)

The FitzWalter coat of arms: d'or ung fece entre deux cheverons de goules ('Or, a fess gules between two chevrons of the last'). The arms are a differenced version of those of de Clare, the senior branch of the family.

John FitzWalter, 2nd Baron FitzWalter (Fitzwalter or Fitz Wauter; c. 1315 – 18 October 1361) (Note: Cokayne is not specific about FitzWalter's precise date of birth, merely stating that he was "aged 13 and more at his father's death".) was an English baron and gang leader in the 14th century. He was a prominent Essex landowner best known for his criminal activities, particularly around Colchester. His family was of a noble and ancient lineage, with connections to the powerful de Clare family, who had arrived in England at the time of the Norman Conquest. The FitzWalters held estates across Essex, as well as properties in London and Norfolk. John FitzWalter played a prominent role during the early years of King Edward III's wars in France, and at some point, FitzWalter was married to Eleanor Percy, the daughter of Henry, Lord Percy.

FitzWalter built a strong affinity around him, mainly from among leading members of the county's gentry, but also including men from elsewhere, such as a Norfolk parson. At their head, FitzWalter waged an armed campaign against the neighbouring town of Colchester, almost from the moment he reached adulthood. The townsmen seem to have exacerbated the dispute by illegally entering FitzWalter's park in Lexden; in return, FitzWalter banned them from one of their own watermills and then, in 1342, he besieged the town, preventing anyone entering or leaving for some weeks, as well as ransacking much property and destroying the market. One historian has described him, in his activities, as the medieval equivalent of a 20th-century American racketeer. Other victims of his Essex gang were local jurors, royal officials, a man forced to abjure the realm, and the prior of Little Dunmow Abbey.

FitzWalter intermittently returned to France and the war, but notwithstanding his royal service—he also served on the royal council and attended parliament regularly—he never held office in his county. Historians explain this as being due to his repeated defiance of the king's peace and his deliberate usurpation of the royal authority. FitzWalter was too powerful, and too aggressive in defence of his rights, for the local populace to confront him in court, and it was not until 1351 that he was finally brought to justice. The King despatched a royal commission to Chelmsford to investigate a broad range of social ills, among which was FitzWalter and his gang. Although most of his force received little or no punishment, FitzWalter himself was arrested and sent to London; he was immediately imprisoned in the Marshalsea. He then languished in the Tower of London for over a year until the King agreed to pardon him. FitzWalter was released and restored to his estates, but only on the condition that he buy the lands back from the King for the immense sum of over £800. FitzWalter died in 1361—still paying off his fine—leaving a son, Walter, as his heir. Lady FitzWalter had predeceased him; they were both buried in Dunmow Priory.

Historians have considered FitzWalter's criminality as illustrating how the disorder that pervaded the 15th century had its origins in the 14th. Although historians have generally considered his activities to demonstrate King Edward III's failure to maintain law and order, as FitzWalter's downfall demonstrates, royal justice could be firm when it chose, if not always swift.

== Early life ==
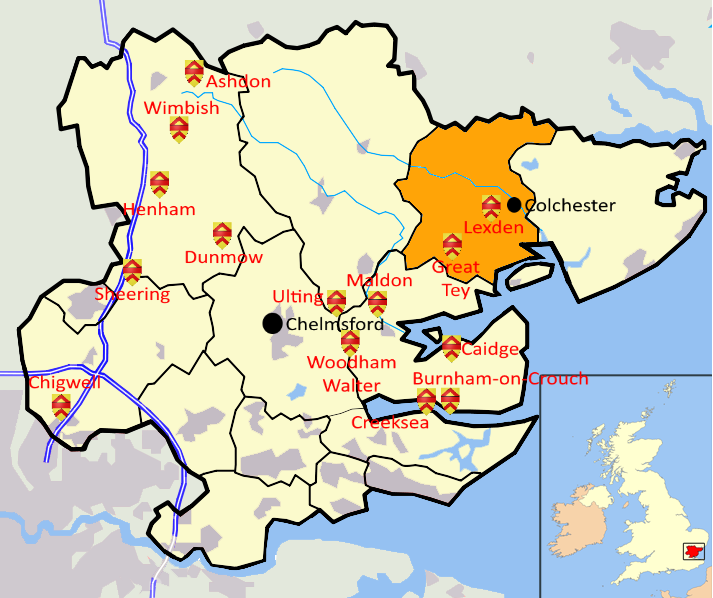
Map of the Hundreds of Essex. With Lexden highlighted, the approximate locations of principal FitzWalter manors are shown.

The FitzWalter family was a wealthy and long-established family in the north-Essex area. Descended from the conquest-era Lords of Clare, the family held estates concentrated around the lordship of Dunmow. They also held estates as distant as Woodham to the south east of the county, Chigwell to the south west, Diss in Norfolk, and Castle Baynard in London. (Note: The FitzWalter family held 14 manors in Essex: Ashdon, Burnham-on-Crouch, Caidge, Chigwell, Creeksea, Little Dunmow, Henham, Lexden, Maldon, Sheering, Great Tey, Ulting, Wimbish and Woodham Walter.) John FitzWalter was the son (probably the only son) of Sir Robert FitzWalter and Joan, daughter of Thomas, Lord Moulton. The family has been described as "warlike as well as rich" even before FitzWalter was born: his ancestor, also named Robert, had been a leading rebel against King John in the early 13th century.

John FitzWalter was around 13 years old when his father died in 1328. The medievalist Christopher Starr in his Oxford Dictionary of National Biography entry on the FitzWalter family, suggests that John was raised by his widowed mother. This may have turned him into "a difficult and dangerous adult". Although by law he could not receive his inheritance until he was 21, in the event, King Edward III allowed him to enter into his estates and titles slightly early, in 1335, when FitzWalter was about 20.

FitzWalter received livery of two-thirds of his inheritance, the remainder being held by his mother as her dower. (Note: The legal concept of dower had existed since the late twelfth century as a means of protecting a woman from being left landless if her husband died first. He would, when they married, assign certain estates to her—a dos nominata, or dower—usually a third of everything of which he was seised.) This, says Starr, "represented a significant slice of the FitzWalter estate", and a wish to augment his wealth may have contributed to FitzWalter's later criminal behaviour. He encountered financial difficulty in London over lands which his grandfather, Robert, had transferred as fine land in 1275 to help found Blackfriars Abbey. Robert had reserved his rights to certain other city properties. This reservation was successfully challenged by the city authorities, and both Robert and John repeatedly attempted to assert their claim. According to the Elizabethan antiquarian John Stow, the last time the latter attempted this in 1347, FitzWalter's demands were "peremptorily" refused by the mayor and Common Council. The FitzWalter family was also traditionally responsible for the defence of the city. In a time of war, the then-Baron FitzWalter was to attend St Paul's Cathedral with a force of 19 knights. There he would receive the city's banner under which London's soldier-citizens would march with him. Caroline Barron, a historian of Medieval London, says that while this may be a "fanciful tale", it paid FitzWalter £20 per annum for the privilege. By the 14th century, though, the city had an established militia and the city authorities no longer deemed the position relevant, and they revoked FitzWalter's privileges and payment. Notwithstanding these financial troubles, as a prominent Essex estate holder, the medievalist Gloria Harris suggests that "with youth, power and wealth, FitzWalter was the 'rich kid' of his day" in Essex society.

== Royal service and war in France ==
Diplomatic relations between England and France had been tempestuous for some years, and in 1337 crisis broke out when the king of France, Philip VI, confiscated the Duchy of Aquitaine, then a possession of English kings. In response, King Edward invaded France, thus beginning the Hundred Years' War. Harris has described the young men of FitzWalter's class and generation as being "untapped pools of genteel manpower", manpower which the King was determined to exploit. FitzWalter was summoned alongside 43 other Essex knights to muster in Ipswich in December 1338. Armed and ready to fight, FitzWalter joined the retinue of William de Bohun, who had recently been created Earl of Northampton.

FitzWalter gained a reputation as a good soldier during Edward III's early campaigns, and he periodically returned to fight in France over the course of his career. In 1346, for example, no longer serving under Northampton, he served with the Prince of Wales, (Note: FitzWalter's transfer to the Prince of Wales' army, says, the historian Andrew Ayton, "removed a sizeable group from the pool of manpower" available to the Earl of Northampton for his own force.) with whom FitzWalter indentured to serve for six months at a wage of 100 marks. In return he brought the Prince 20 men-at-arms (himself, four other knights and 15 esquires) and 12 archers. As part of the Black Prince's vanguard FitzWalter fought at the siege of Calais in 1346. He was by now an experienced soldier and had been made a knight banneret. He was still on campaign in France in 1348, by which time he had returned to Northampton's service.

FitzWalter frequently returned to England to attend parliament. He was first summoned as Johannes de fitz Wauter in 1340, and was to attend every session for the next 20 years. He was also a royal councillor, having been appointed in 1341 and serving in that capacity until 1358. In 1342 FitzWalter was one of 250 knights to take part in a great tournament held at Dunstable, alongside his later partner in crime, Sir Robert Marney.

At some point in his career, FitzWalter married Eleanor, second daughter of Henry Percy, Lord Percy. They had at least two children, Walter, his heir, and a daughter Alice (d. 11 May 1400). Alice married Aubrey de Vere, 10th Earl of Oxford, although it is unknown whether this was during her father's lifetime.

== Criminal career ==
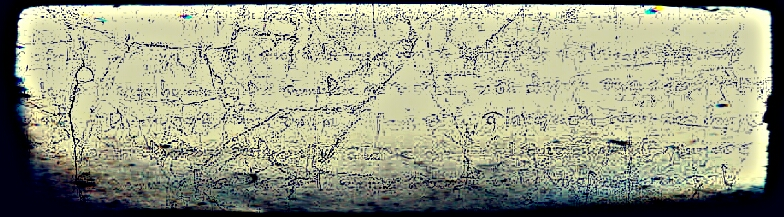
National Archives, document SC 8/311/15549: Petition of John, Baron FitzWalter to the king, c. 1348. Although faded, FitzWalter is complaining to the king and council that the law is unclear regarding whom one holds escheated lands that have been granted in fee simple, when they were previously held by a lord who has forfeited them. FitzWalter requests clarity on this point of law, and the king endorses it.

The Historian Margaret Hastings described FitzWalter as being of "good family and great possessions, but nonetheless a familiar racketeer type". Starr suggests that for many men of his generation, experience on the Scottish and then French fronts exacerbated a "natural appetite for aggression and intimidation". Essex gentry and their affinities had been at the forefront of Edward I's Gascon campaigns of the late-13th century, and by the early 14th century Essex society was a highly militarized one. These factors, says Starr, probably contributed to FitzWalter's increasingly violent behaviour, and by 1340 he was launched on a career of crime during which he terrorised the county. The medieval scholar Ian Mortimer, in what the Washington Post reviewer Aaron Leitko called a "Fodor's-style" book—The Time Traveller's Guide to Medieval England—says of FitzWalter "nor do you want to come up against" him. In 1340, FitzWalter took part in an incursion of John de Segrave's manor in Great Chesterford. FitzWalter was in a gang of more than thirty men led by the Earl of Oxford: Segrave later reported that FitzWalter and his associates "broke his park ... hunted therein, carried away his goods and his deer from the park, and assaulted his men and servants". (Note: Regardless of one's other criminal activities, park raiding was a favoured pastime, explains Gloria Harris, because it was "a way of securing luxury food, such as venison, making a profit on the value of the animals poached, or taking revenge on the owner—or it may have just been for the thrill of the chase". FitzWalter was not alone in his behaviour: gang-warfare was common in the early fourteenth century, and his generation has been described as "a roll-call of colourful, gentry criminals". Andrew Ayton has noted that, summoned alongside FitzWalter in 1338, were equally infamous men, including members of both the Folville and Coterel gangs, who had been active in the East Midlands the previous decade.)

FitzWalter gathered his own affinity for the prominent local gentry around him. They included such figures as Lionel Bradenham (Note: Bradenham has been described as "no common criminal [being] a successful and innovative farmer, a lawyer legal adviser" who—unlike FitzWalter—had sat on royal commissions in Essex. Although described by Furber as a "doubtful character" on account of his association with FitzWalter, he was not indicted in 1351.)—steward of FitzWalter's Lexden manor, and who held the manor of Langenhoe from FitzWalter for knight's service—and Robert Marney. Marney, like FitzWalter, was a seasoned soldier from the French wars and something of a gangster in his own right. (Note: Marney had taken part in a major operation—possibly over the course of several days—against the Earl of Northampton's Essex estates in 1342. During this attack, he and about ten others had systematically raided, damaged, and stole from seven of the earl's parks in diverse parts of the county.) With the support of powerful and influential local men like these, FitzWalter earned himself "a considerable reputation ... as a thug of the first order", and the most feared man in Essex, wrote Harris.

The names of many of FitzWalter's gangsters are known to historians by the survival of their later indictments. They include Walter Althewelde, William Baltrip, John Brekespere, John Burlee, John Clerke, Thomas Garderober, William Saykin, Roger Scheep, John Stacey and William de Wyborne. Another, known only as Roger, was the parson of Osemondiston. (Note: Osemondiston, later called Osmondston, was a village in FitzWalter's manor of Diss, on the River Waveney. It was also known as Scole, by which name it is known today.) In return for furthering FitzWalter's causes, his retainers could expect his full protection: on at least one occasion he broke one of his men, Wymarcus Heirde, out of Colchester gaol before he could be brought before the justices. Heirde had been attached and imprisoned at the berestake by the bailiffs of Colchester, but before they could begin proceedings FitzWalter despatched "Simon Spryng' and others" to free Heirde with force of arms.

Lord Fitzwalter's bailiffs ... distrain[ed] all the animals of the prior, and to impark and retain the said distress until the £30 were fully paid. As a result, the prior did not dare to keep his ploughs and carts on his land to cultivate the land or carry the corn, whereupon the ripening corn withered and the prior lost all the profit from his land, to such great damage to the house that the king, feeling for the destruction of Holy Church, took the said house under his protection.

— National Archives manuscript JUST 1/266

The later indictments list FitzWalter's litany of crimes. He took illegal distraints. He behaved as he liked, it was reported, "to his poor neighbours, because no sheriff or bailiff dared to free any distraint which he had taken, be it ever so unjust". He also indulged in extortion. On one occasion he extorted 100 shillings from two men in Southminster. On another, FitzWalter persuaded one Walter of Mucking to transfer lands worth £40 a year to FitzWalter, for which FitzWalter was to pay Walter an annual rent of £22. FitzWalter also pledged to provide Walter with luxurious robes and tunics in kind. In the event, FitzWalter not only paid hardly any rent but refused to hand over the clothes he had promised. Walter of Mucking dared not take legal action against FitzWalter. Few men did. For example, Richard de Plescys, Prior of Dunmow Priory, was intimidated into storing and looking after a cart and horses of FitzWalter's, at the prior's own expense. The prior did not report FitzWalter, despite the fact that his house, at least in theory, enjoyed the king's personal protection. (Note: The protection was reiterated in November 1451 as a result of what the Calendar of Patent Rolls describes as the "wretched depression to which the priory of Dunmow is subjected through the willful injuries and damages of men of those parts scheming to destroy the said priory".) FitzWalter later despatched his henchman Baltrip to forcibly and illegally amerce and distrain the prior.

Cattle rustling was an important pastime of the FitzWalter gang as it was a major source of revenue. They seized cattle from Colchester's main monastic house, the Priory of St. John, for which the prior later denounced FitzWalter as "a common destroyer of men of religion". In this particular case, FitzWalter treated the priory's cattle extremely poorly: they were either worked to death or left to starve. For two years, he also illegally pastured his own sheep and cattle on common land used by the town's burgess, which abutted his own Lexden Park estate. (Note: A remnant of FitzWalter's Lexden Park is still extant today (51°53′20.7″N 0°51′53.9″E). Covering slightly over 8 hectares (80,000 m^{2}), it lies to the south of Lexden Road, between Church Lane and Fitzwalter (sic) Road. The vast majority of the Park in Fitzwalter's day was to the north of the road.)

FitzWalter's gang were also responsible for killings. In 1345, one Roger Byndethese was sentenced at Waltham to abjuration of the realm. As part of his sentence, he was to carry a large cross from Waltham to Dover, where he was to sail from. He never reached the port: intercepted by FitzWalter's men outside Waltham, they—claiming to act "under the banner of God and of Holy Church", but actually at the command of their lord—summarily beheaded Byndethese by the roadside. (Note: It is unknown why FitzWalter had commanded his men to kill Byndethese, but it was not an uncommon fate for those who abjured the realm in the 13th and 14th centuries. In many cases, the victim swore to take a certain route to the coast, it being subsequently recorded that the abjurer "strayed off", "deviated from" or was "fleeing from his path" and that it was explicitly for this that local vigilantes beheaded him. Generally, too, this was not seen as an unlawful killing by the courts. The scholar Kenneth Duggan has argued that this allowed the men responsible, such as FitzWalter, to "bypass ... formal justice and formal jurisdictional lines". The principle behind such vigilantism was that, to contemporaries, the abjurer who departed from the king's highway rejected "the warrant of Holy Church, to wit, the cross", and thus put himself beyond the protection of the church.)

Larceny was also much favoured by the gang. One method was to force men to enfeoff FitzWalter and his band with their possessions, who would then have to be paid off before returning the goods. Similarly, FitzWalter confiscated sacks of wool from a Burnham-on-Crouch merchant which they refused to return until he paid them a substantial sum. FitzWalter and his men regularly looted all the fish, meat and victuals they required from Colchester doing so "at their will, to the oppression of the whole market". They repeatedly violated the town's rules of trade, both inside and outside the marketplace. Such was the fear FitzWalter was held in, that when he refused to pay what he had been assessed for a royal tax—even though he had intimidated the tax assessor into rating him for the lowest amount possible—the "men of the villages paid for him to their great impoverishment". He had, after all, threatened to break the legs and arms ("tibia et bracchia") and leave to die anyone who refused to do so.

=== Siege of Colchester ===
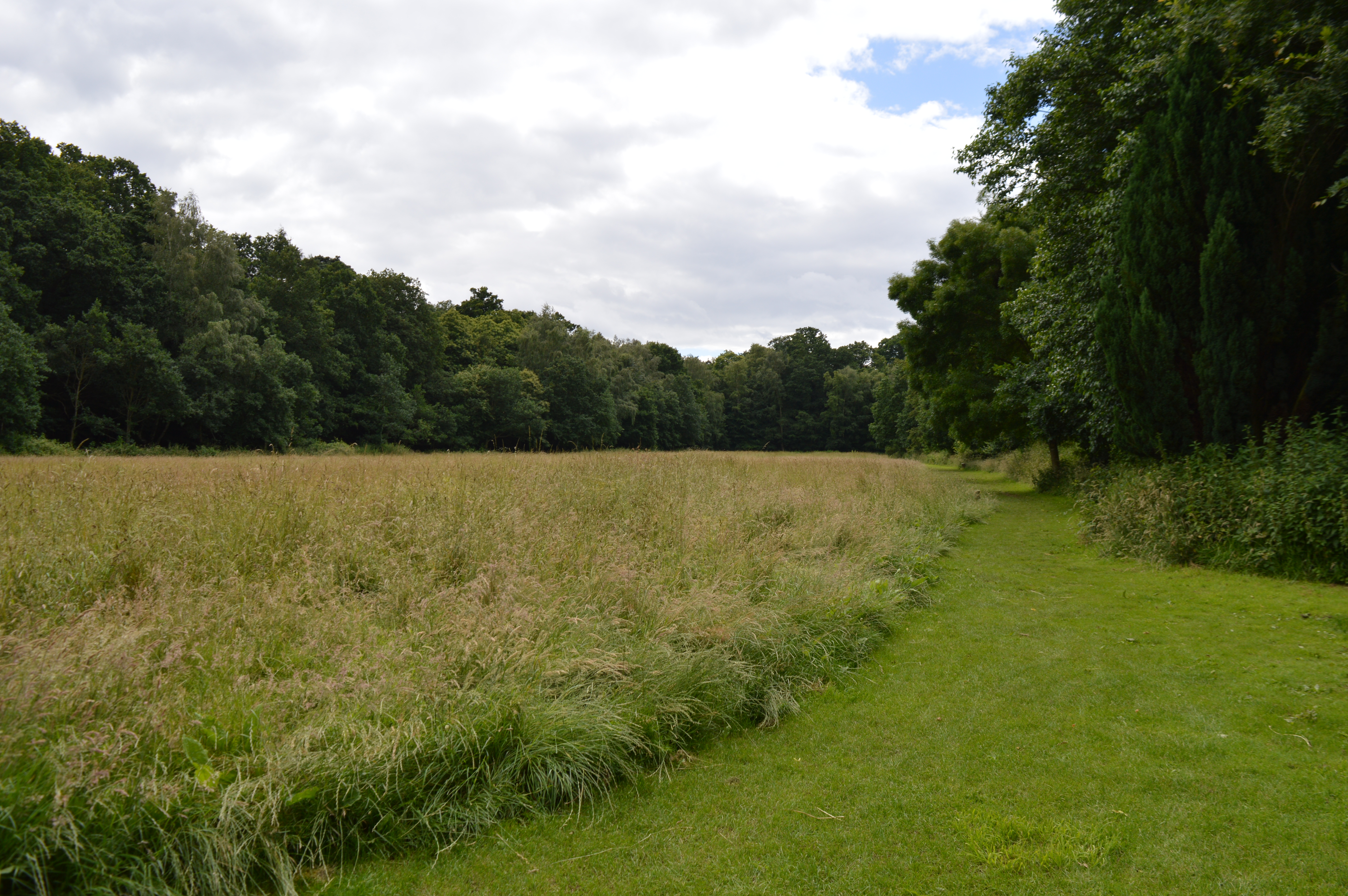
A portion of Lexden Park, seen in 2016. The small portion that remains of FitzWalter's estate is now a nature reserve.

The FitzWalter family had long had turbulent relations with their Colchester neighbours. (Note: W. R. Powell has explained this historical tension by the transformation of Colchester, by the 14th century, into "one of the most important towns in eastern England. Under a series of royal charters, from 1189 onwards, the burgesses had secured a degree of self-government, including the right to hold a hundred court for the town and its liberty (or suburbs), certain hunting rights in the liberty, and a monopoly of fishing in the River Colne. But the earlier charters had been loosely drafted, and disputes often arose concerning the burgesses' jurisdiction over the manors within the liberty, and over the river." The dispute between the burgesses and the FitzWalters, he suggests, specifically arose because the borough had claimed Lexden since Saxon times, but their claims had been put aside after the conquest.) In 1312, townsmen and merchants had broken into Lexden Park and hunted Robert FitzWalter's deer. The principal source of antagonism between the two parties was over disputed pasture rights in Lexden, and the area was the scene of many confrontations and assaults from both sides. FitzWalter, in turn, denied the jurisdiction of Colchester burgesses there and prevented the town from taxing his tenantry on the estate. There was also repeated friction over a watermill adjacent to FitzWalter's Lexden Park. Although owned by Colchester men, FitzWalter objected to the presence of any men from the town near his property and refused them entry to their own mill for over six months. The townspeople later complained that, although FitzWalter had, at some point, offered to buy it from them, "Lord John has not paid for it and still keeps it". Further, to ensure a constant supply of water for his mill, FitzWalter evicted the owner of another watermill in nearby West Bergholt to use it as a backup for his own; the mill's owner was also a townsman of Colchester.

FitzWalter's grievances against the men of Colchester may not have been without foundation. In 1342, claimed FitzWalter, Colchester men had invaded Lexden Park, in an attempt to assert their own rights of pasturing, hunting and fishing there. The medievalist Richard Britnell has highlighted how "on this issue feelings ran sufficiently high for large numbers of burgesses to take the law into their own hands; pasture riots are more in evidence than any other form of civil disturbance" in Essex at this time. Britnell also notes, though, that it is unlikely that anyone held rights to common pasture on the Lexden estate. FitzWalter petitioned the king that about a hundred Colchester men had, in the course of their trespass, "broke [FitzWalter's] park at Lexden, hunted therein, felled his trees, fished in his stews, carried away the trees and fish as well as deer from the park and assaulted his servant John Osekyn there, whereby he lost his service for a great time". Lexden Park was one of FitzWalter's most valuable possessions, consisting of over 150 acres (61 hectares) of pasture, which in 1334 had been valued for tax purposes at over £1,300. In July a commission of oyer and terminer was sent to Essex to investigate FitzWalter's complaints.

A crisis point was reached when one of FitzWalter's men was killed during another attack on Lexden Park. An inquest was held in Colchester, but FitzWalter disputed its findings. Instead—and in breach of the borough's liberties which allowed it to administer its own internal affairs—FitzWalter brought in the county coroner (probably one of his own retainers) to perform another inquest. Neither inquest appears to have satisfied the parties involved. FitzWalter attempted to have a bailiff of Colchester, John Fordham, indicted for the death, but to no avail.

FitzWalter reacted violently to the death of his man, doubtless encouraged by previous attacks on Lexden and the injuries to Osekyn. Now he began to hunt down members of both inquest juries and beat them up. The first victim was Henry Fernerd of Copford, a juryman who had publicly expressed his faith in Fordham's innocence. FitzWalter's men beat him nearly to death. FitzWalter soon widened his attacks to Colchester tenantry more generally, seeking them out as far afield as Maldon and Southminster. FitzWalter then escalated his attacks on individuals to the town itself, and on 20 May 1342 placed Colchester under an armed siege. He ambushed anyone caught entering or leaving the town, "until no man [could] go to a market or fair from Easter until Whitsuntide". FitzWalter and his men barricaded the roads with wood from the broken doors and roof beams of houses they had destroyed. His physical campaign against the townsmen was accompanied by legal attacks, in which he attempted to fix juries against them. FitzWalter's siege lasted until 22 July, when the burghers paid FitzWalter £40 compensation. This did not bring peace between them: FitzWalter again besieged the town from 7 April to 1 June the following year. This may have been provoked by continuing incursions by the town onto his Lexden estate. He was paid another £40 to lift this siege, and those who attempted to sue for the damage he and his men had caused found that local juries were too afraid to bring verdicts against FitzWalter and his gang. Not only did the gang fully support their lord, its members often carried out their own operations in the knowledge of his protection. For example, Bradenham himself besieged Colchester for three months in autumn 1350. The country had been ravaged by the Black Death in 1348, and Partington suggests that this was the catalyst for the King to take action against FitzWalter. Society had been unsettled by the disease, and Edward "was determined that lords should be made to look to their responsibilities to the realm".

=== Indictment ===
Essex, Jennifer Ward has written, "suffered severely" from the FitzWalter gang's activities throughout the 1340s. It was difficult for justice to be done, though, and was to take nearly ten years. During that time he effectively usurped the king's writ in the north of the county. This forced the role of keeping the king's peace upon him, with what has been described as a "rival system of justice" to that of the crown. FitzWalter's expeditions to France—which periodically removed him from the theatre of conflict—were deliberate attempts by King Edward at solving the problem without a need for taking legal action. (Note: Recruiting offenders for military service was a common strategy of Edward III, as he both gained a soldier and at the same time removed a troublemaker. The men would often be pardoned on their return, and as such the practice was unpopular with contemporaries: petitions against it had been submitted to parliament in 1328, 1330, 1336 and 1340.) This was an impermanent solution. Eventually, in response to FitzWalter's continuing outrages, a commission of the peace, probably under the authority of William Shareshull, was despatched to Chelmsford early in 1351. (Note: This was necessary because of endemic corruption within the King's Bench then sitting at Chelmsford. Shareshull's commission was to remain there until 1361, and particularly focussed on the enforcement of labour laws. As a result of its lengthy tenure, it raised fines from 7,500 individuals, which amounted to more than one in ten of the adult Essex populace.) As a result, writes the scholar Elizabeth C. Furber, "justice, of a sort, finally caught up" with FitzWalter. Shareshull's commission indicted FitzWalter for failing to appear to answer accusations of felony.

Thus the great man, with most of his confederates, got off with fines; one 'little' man was hanged. 'As it is seide in olde proverbe—"Pore be hangid bi the necke; a riche man bi the purs".' (Note: This proverb is found in the 15th-century British Library Add. MS 41321, folio 86.)

— Elizabeth C. Furber

Thus outlawed, FitzWalter was judged guilty of multiple serious crimes, such as extortion and refusal to pay taxes. His fundamental offence, says Ward, was "encroaching on the royal power". FitzWalter's indictment roll, notes Margaret Hastings, listed so many offences that it "read like an index to the record of indictment for a whole county". (Note: FitzWalter's indictment roll is held at the National Archives in Kew, classified as JUST 1/266. The FitzWalter gang's portion of the indictments consists of three membranes, probably the raw notes taken contemporaneously—"the clerk probably had no time to recopy them"—and written in French. They are marked on the dorse as having been taken at Chelmsford in 1351 and forwarded Coram Rege the same year.) On 31 January 1351, the King summoned FitzWalter by a writ of capias and he appeared before the King's Bench at Westminster Palace. Found guilty, he was cast into Marshalsea Prison and his estates confiscated. In November, FitzWalter was transferred to the Tower of London, where he was allocated ten shillings a day from his estates for his subsistence. FitzWalter, says the historian Mark Ormrod, had been "publicly discredited". The King not only wanted Essex to return to a state of peace, he also intended to make an example of FitzWalter to the nobility generally. The King, he argues, "expected his beneficiaries to observe standards of behaviour more acceptable to him and to the political community". Likewise, argues the medievalist Richard Partington, "Edward's anger was especially terrifying in cases where he believed nobles were abusing their position to oppress others". The King also did not, it seems, take FitzWalter's earlier loyal service in France into account when weighing up FitzWalter's punishment.

Some, although not all, of FitzWalter's associates were also convicted. Marney and Bradenham were imprisoned and fined (and later released) with their lord. The parson was forced to give up his benefice. Others were either pardoned—in at least one case following military service in Brittany—or exigented. Some were exonerated outright. Only one minor member of the gang, William de Wyborne, was hanged for his crimes; his chattels—worth 40d—were confiscated.

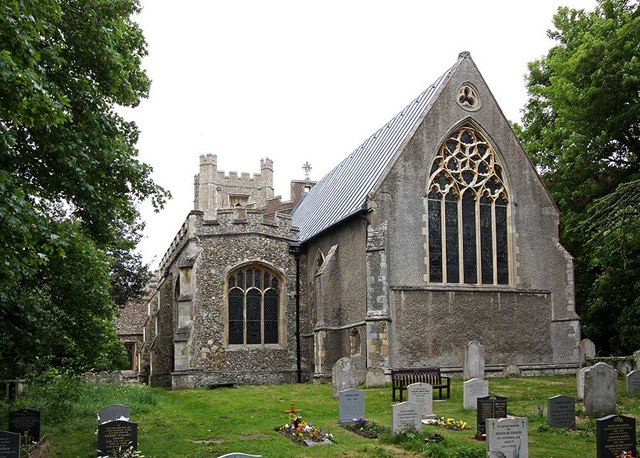
St Mary the Virgin Church, Little Dunmow, all that remains in 2009 of the medieval priory, whose prior FitzWalter terrorised and where he and his wife were buried.

FitzWalter was imprisoned for a year, and following his release in June 1352, the King pardoned him. The pardon was a substantial document, and covered murder, robbery, rape, arson, kidnapping, trespass, extortion and incitement, and ranged from thefboot (Note: Theft-boot, also spelled thef-boot or thef-bote, is "The taking of some payment from a thief to obtain security from legal prosecution; either the receiving back by the owner of the stolen goods or of some compensation, or the taking of a bribe by a person who ought to have brought the thief to justice.") to illegally carrying off other's rabbits to the usurpation of royal justice.

FitzWalter was also bound to pay Edward the "colossal" amount of (at least) £847 2s 4d; (Note: Furber points out that it is difficult to establish the precise amount demanded by the crown, "as there are numerous small amounts on the Pipe Rolls" which may or may not be connected to FitzWalter. The figure provided is the sum of all the major payments he is certain to have paid and is thus a minimum.) this he paid off incrementally. In doing so, FitzWalter effectively bought his estates back from the King. Indeed, the size of the fine—which he spent the last decade of his life paying—is probably the only reason his estates were returned to him in the first place. For ten years, comments Barbara Hanawalt, the pipe rolls "benignly enter payments to the king from his 'dear and faithful' John FitzWalter".

== Later life ==
Probably as a direct consequence of his violent behaviour in Essex, and although he sat in parliament and on the king's council, he never held royal office in the county, and nor was he appointed to any of its commissions.

FitzWalter died on 18 October 1361, and was buried alongside his wife and ancestors in Dunmow Priory. Eleanor had predeceased him, although not, apparently, by long. His mother survived him, still controlling a third of his estate. On the day of FitzWalter's death, one farthing remained owing to the crown from his fine a decade earlier. He was succeeded in his estates and titles by his son Walter, who had been born in 1345 ("at the height", says Starr, "of his father's criminal activities"). Walter, unlike his father, was to be a loyal servant of the crown and helped to suppress the Peasants' Revolt in Essex for King Richard II in 1381. Walter was also to be a close ally of his brother-in-law the Earl of Oxford in the politically turbulent years towards the end of Richard's reign.

The criminal activities and disregard for the law demonstrated by men such as John FitzWalter, says Elisabeth Kimball, suggests that "the lack of governance associated with fifteenth-century England seems to have had its roots in the fourteenth". FitzWalter, argues the historian G. L. Harriss, was fundamentally "flawed in character" and from his youth had been on a "downward spiral of violence which brought the withdrawal of lordly and neighbourhood protection" both by the crown and by the rest of the local gentry. Characters such as FitzWalter have traditionally been seen by historians as demonstrating Edward III's poor record with law and order; on the other hand, suggests Ormrod, although royal justice may have been delayed, it was still sure, and when it came, harsh.

== Notes ==
Peerage of England
Preceded by Robert FitzWalter	Baron FitzWalter; 1326–1361	Succeeded by Walter FitzWalter
