= Baron Multon of Egremont =

English title of nobility

Coat of arms of Baron Multon of Egremont Argent, three bars Gules..

The title Baron Multon de/of Egremont was created once in the Peerage of England. On 6 February 1299 Thomas de Multon was summoned to Parliament. On the death of the second baron, the barony fell into abeyance in 1334.

== Barons Multon de Egremont (1299) ==
- Thomas de Multon, 1st Baron Multon of Egremont (1276–1322) was summoned to Parliament as Baron Multon of Egremont, from 26 January 1297 to 15 May 1320. He was constantly engaged in the Scottish wars. Thomas was the great-grandson or 2nd great-grandson of Thomas de Multon (d.1240). He was succeeded by his son.
- John de Multon, 2nd Baron Multon of Egremont (1308–1334) (abeyant 1334), was the second Baron Multon of Egremont. He married Annabel de Holbeche, but died without issue in 1334. His estates were divided between his sisters:
- Joane de Multon, wife of Lord Robert Fitz-Walter, inherited Egremont Castle. Her (probably only) son by Lord Robert was John FitzWalter, 2nd Baron FitzWalter.
- Elizabeth de Multon, wife of Walter de Bermicham, inherited lands in Gosford and other manors.
- Margaret de Multon, wife of Thomas de Lucie of Cockermouth, 2nd Baron Lucy, inherited lands in Cumberland.

Whilst the barony fell into abeyance among these ladies, it still continued with their descendants and representatives.

== See also ==
- Thomas de Multon, 1st Baron Multon of Gilsland
