= Walter FitzWalter, 4th Baron FitzWalter =

English baron (1368–1406)

Walter FitzWalter, 4th Baron FitzWalter (according to some sources, 5th Baron Fitzwalter; 5 September 1368–16 May 1406), was an English nobleman.

== Origin ==
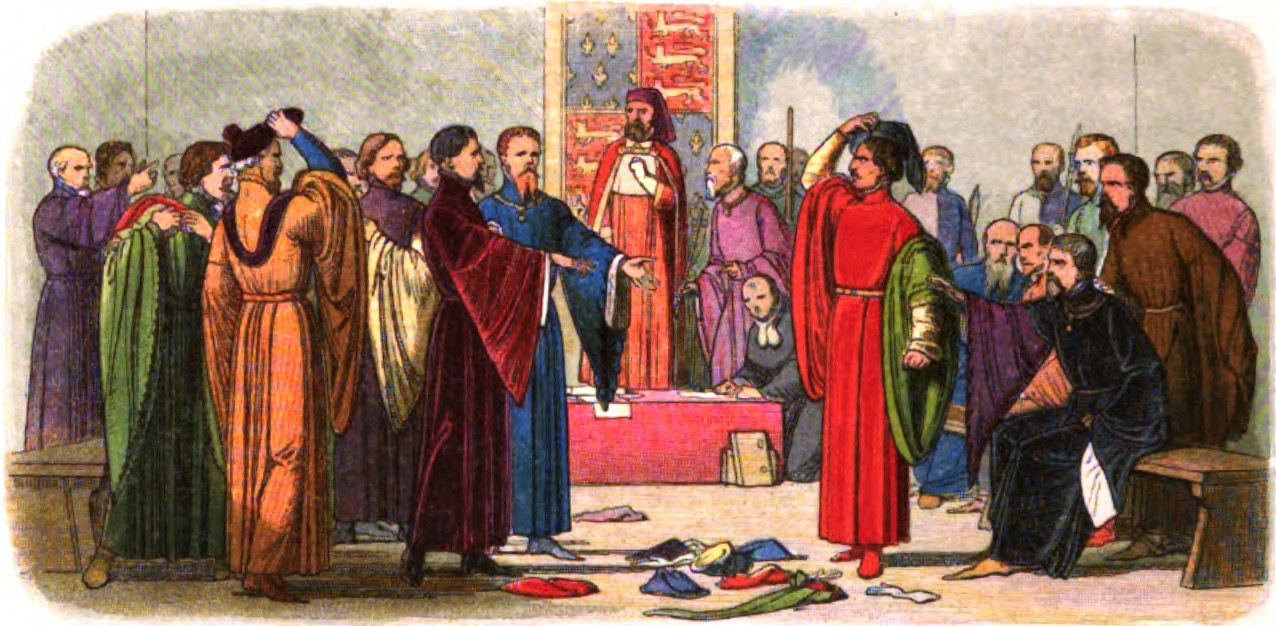
FitzWalter challenges Edward, Duke of Aumale (historicizing depiction from 1864)

Walter FitzWalter came from the noble FitzWalter family. He was the second son of Walter FitzWalter, 3rd Baron FitzWalter, and his wife Eleanor Dagworth. His older brother Robert predeceased him. His father died in 1386, making him heir to his estates in Essex and other parts of England. However, since his stepmother Philippa Mohun had a claim to a third of her husband's estate as a widow, his inheritance was greatly reduced. She survived him and did not die until 1431.

== Life ==
In contrast to his ancestors, FitzWalter served less in the military and was primarily politically active. As Baron FitzWalter, he took part in parliaments, allying himself with Thomas of Woodstock, Duke of Gloucester, under whom his father had served in the Hundred Years' War. His castle at Pleshey was close to his estates of Woodham Walter and Henham. In February 1395 he accompanied Gloucester when he travelled to Ireland on behalf of King Richard II. Gloucester died in 1397 under uncertain circumstances. On 18 October 1399, during the first parliament of the new King Henry IV, Fitzwalter accused Edward of Norwich, Duke of Aumale, his stepfather, of the murder of Gloucester and challenged him to single combat. This was stopped by the king, but it was not until 1401 that FitzWalter and Edward of Norwich formally reconciled. Due to Owain Glyndwr's rebellion in Wales, the king commissioned him in 1403 to fortify Dorstone Castle on the border with Wales. In his homeland of Essex, however, FitzWalter did not appear politically and did not take up any office. During a trip to Italy, FitzWalter was captured by Saracen corsairs between Rome and Naples. He was brought to Tunis and only released by Genoese merchants after a long period of captivity. Weakened by the privations of captivity, he died in Italy.

== Family ==
FitzWalter had married Joan Devereux (1379–1409), a daughter of John Devereux, 1st Baron Devereux, and Margaret de Vere, before April 1390. After the childless death of her brother John in 1396, his wife inherited his estate. He had at least two children with her:

- Humphrey FitzWalter, 6th Baron FitzWalter (or 5th) (1398–1415)
- Walter FitzWalter, 7th Baron FitzWalter (or 6th) (1400–1431)

After FitzWalter's death, his widow married Hugh Burnell, 2nd Baron Burnell.
