= Ian Mortimer (historian) =

British historian and writer

Ian Mortimer FSA FRHistS
- Born: 1967 (age 58–59); Petts Wood, London Borough of Bromley, England
- Education: University of Exeter; University College London
- Writing career
- Genres: History, historiography, historical fiction
- Website: www.ianmortimer.com

Ian James Forrester Mortimer (born 1967) FSA, FRHistS is a British historian and writer of historical fiction. He is best known for his book The Time Traveller's Guide to Medieval England, which became a Sunday Times bestseller in paperback in 2010.

== Early life and education ==
Ian James Forrester Mortimer was born in 1967, in Petts Wood, and was educated at Eastbourne College, the University of Exeter (BA, PhD, DLitt) and University College London (MA). He has BA, MA and PhD degrees in history.

== Career ==
Between 1993 and 2003, he worked for several major research institutions, including the Royal Commission on Historical Manuscripts, the University of Exeter, and the University of Reading. From 2000-2003, he was the University of Exeter's first professional archivist.

His first publications were poems, published in various literary magazines. In 2000, his work "31 December 1999" was awarded the University of Exeter's prize for a "poem for the Millennium", open to all present and past students of the university, and judged by the then poet laureate, Andrew Motion.

Since 2001, he has been a self-employed writer. From 2003 to 2009, he published a sequence of biographies of medieval political leaders: first Roger Mortimer, 1st Earl of March, then Edward III, and Henry IV, in addition to 1415, a year in the life of Henry V.

Mortimer's best-known book is The Time Traveller's Guide to Medieval England, first published in the United Kingdom in 2008. It was followed by The Time Traveller's Guide to Elizabethan England (which became a BBC TV series, presented by the author), The Time Traveller's Guide to Restoration Britain and The Time Travellers Guide to Regency Britain.

He is also well known for pioneering, in his first two books and an article in The English Historical Review, the argument (based on evidence such as the Fieschi Letter) that Edward II did not die in Berkeley Castle in 1327.

Mortimer has also carried out research into the social history of early modern medicine. His essay "The Triumph of the Doctors" was awarded the 2004 Alexander Prize by the Royal Historical Society. In this essay he demonstrated that ill and injured people close to death shifted their hopes of physical salvation from an exclusively religious source of healing power (God, or Jesus Christ) to a predominantly human one (physicians and surgeons) over the period 1615–1670, and argued that this shift of outlook was among the most profound changes western society has ever experienced.

In 2011, Mortimer entered the genre of historical fiction, publishing the first book from his Elizabethan era Clarenceux Trilogy using the pen name of James Forrester. James Forrester are Mortimer's middle names. His fourth novel, The Outcasts of Time, was published under his ordinary name: it won the 2018 Winston Graham Prize for Historical Fiction.

== Other roles ==
In 2003, he was appointed by the Secretary of State Member of Dartmoor National Park Authority, representing the parishes. In 2009, he was reappointed as a Member by the Secretary of State, this time representing the national interest – a role which he continued to perform until 2017.

Other public appointments have included the Lord Chancellor's Forum on Historical Manuscripts and Academic Research, 2011–17 (subsequently known as the Forum on Archives and Academic Research) and the Fabric Advisory Committee of Exeter Cathedral, 2011–16.

== Criticism of Wikipedia ==
In a 2010 essay by Mortimer, he criticised Wikipedia's spurning of primary sources, and its apparent inability to publish the latest research done by experts in a field, citing his involvement with editing the birth date of Henry V as an example. (Note: The date of birth has since been amended to reflect the date suggested by Mortimer based on his research.) He wrote that Wikipedia "elevates discarded and outdated opinion to the same level or even above that of well-evidenced knowledge". In a short piece written in 2012, he was again highly critical of Wikipedia and Jimmy Wales. In this piece, he opined that "the structure of Wikipedia promotes hearsay, prejudice, supposition and superficiality on an equal footing with genuine information and understanding", and that Wales created the resource for his own political ends.

== Personal life ==
Mortimer is the nephew of the British tennis player Angela Mortimer.

Among his interests, he includes running. In 2017, he wrote a memoir about the meaning of running, which relates the various lessons he had learnt from taking part in parkrun and half marathons – which was published as Why Running Matters: lessons in life, pain and exhilaration, from 5K to the marathon (Summersdale, 2019).

== Honours ==
Mortimer is a Fellow of the Royal Historical Society (FRHistS).

On 12 February 2015, he was elected a Fellow of the Society of Antiquaries of London (FSA).

== Historical works (selected) ==
- Through the Windows of an Ordinary House: A History of England (The Bodley Head, 2026)
- Medieval Horizons: Why the Middle Ages Matter (The Bodley Head, 2023)
- The Time Traveller's Guide to Regency Britain (The Bodley Head, 2022)
- The Time Traveller's Guide to Restoration Britain: Life in the Age of Samuel Pepys, Isaac Newton and The Great Fire of London (The Bodley Head, 2017)
- What isn't History? Selected Articles and Speeches on Writing History and Historical Fiction (Rosetta (ebook only), 2017)
- Human Race: Ten Centuries of Change on Earth (Vintage, 2015; formerly published as Centuries of Change: which century saw the most change and why it matters to us by The Bodley Head, 2014)
- The Time Traveller's Guide to Elizabethan England: a Handbook for Visitors to the Sixteenth Century (Viking, 2012) (paper: Penguin, 2013)
- Medieval Intrigue: Decoding Royal Conspiracies (Continuum, 2010)
- 1415: Henry V's Year of Glory (The Bodley Head, 2009)
- The Dying and the Doctors: the Medical Revolution in Seventeenth-Century England (The Royal Historical Society, 2009)
- The Time Traveller's Guide to Medieval England: a Handbook for Visitors to the Fourteenth Century (The Bodley Head, 2008)
- "What isn't History? The Nature and Enjoyment of History in the Twenty-First Century", History, 93, 4 (October 2008), pp. 454–74.
- "Beyond the Facts: how true originality in history has fallen foul of postmodernism, research targets and commercial pressure", Times Literary Supplement (26 September 2008), pp. 16–17.
- The Fears of Henry IV: the Life of England's Self-Made King (Jonathan Cape, 2007)
- The Perfect King: the Life of Edward III, Father of the English Nation (Jonathan Cape, 2006)
- The Death of Edward II in Berkeley Castle, The English Historical Review, cxx, 489 (2005), pp. 1175–1214.
- The Triumph of the Doctors: Medical Assistance to the Dying, 1570–1720, Transactions of the Royal Historical Society, 15 (2005), pp. 97–116.
- The Greatest Traitor: the Life of Sir Roger Mortimer, 1st Earl of March, Ruler of England 1327–1330 (Jonathan Cape, 2003)
- Berkshire Probate Accounts, 1583–1712 (Berkshire Record Society, 1999)
- Berkshire Glebe Terriers, 1634 (Berkshire Record Society, 1995)

== Historical fiction (writing as Ian Mortimer) ==
- The Outcasts of Time (UK: Simon & Schuster, 2017 US: Pegasus, 2018).

== Historical fiction (writing as James Forrester) ==
- Sacred Treason (UK: Headline, 2010 US: Sourcebooks, 2012)
- The Roots of Betrayal (UK: Headline, 2011 US: Sourcebooks, 2013)
- The Final Sacrament (UK: Headline, 2012 US: Sourcebooks, 2013)
