= The Time Traveller's Guide to Medieval England =

2008 non-fiction book by Ian Mortimer

The Time Traveller's Guide to Medieval England: A Handbook for Visitors to the Fourteenth Century
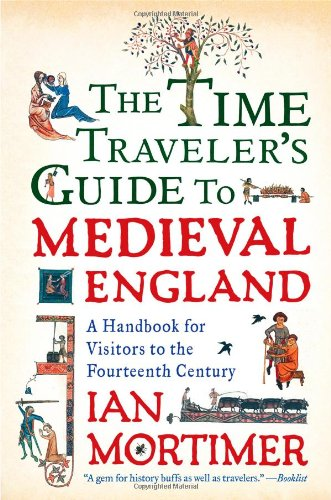
- Front cover of the US edition, with spelling of "Traveller" modified
- Author: Ian Mortimer
- Language: English
- Series: Time Traveller's Guide
- Subject: 14th century England
- Genre: History
- Publisher: The Bodley Head
- Publication place: United Kingdom
- English publication date: 2 October 2008
- Media type: Print
- Pages: 319
- ISBN: 0224079948
- Followed by: The Time Traveller's Guide to Elizabethan England

The Time Traveller's Guide to Medieval England: A Handbook for Visitors to the Fourteenth Century is a handbook about Late Medieval England by British historian Ian Mortimer. It was first published on 2 October 2008 by The Bodley Head, and a later edition with more pages was released on 29 February 2012. The volume debunks and explains various myths about the period.

The book is confined to the 14th century in England, with passing references to the Continent. Mortimer goes into details about food, clothing, building materials, the layout of houses, but also covers things like laws, customs, travel, entertainment. It is ground-breaking in historical literature in that it is written entirely in the present tense.

== Illustrations ==
All the illustrations in the volume were provided by the British Library.

== Reception ==
The book has sold more than 250,000 paperback copies in the UK, 100,000 copies in the USA, and is published in several other languages.

Sue Arnold, writing in The Guardian, commented "After The Canterbury Tales this has to be the most entertaining book ever written about the Middle Ages." Professor Stephen Howe, writing in The Independent, remarked that it was "Perhaps the most enjoyable history book I've read all year."

A review written by Kathryn Hughes for The Guardian praised the book's different approach and abundance of trivia, adding that "It is Monty Python and the Holy Grail with footnotes and, my goodness, it is fun... The result of this careful blend of scholarship and fancy is a jaunty journey through the 14th century, one that wriggles with the stuff of everyday life... [A] deft summary of life in the high medieval period." However she found the stylistic choice of narration to be "awkward". The Washington Post's short review by Aaron Leitko said it had a "Fodor's-style framework", like a travel book into the "heart of a different time zone".

Tom Holland, writing for The Daily Telegraph, described the volume as an "old-fashioned study". Holland also proposed that Mortimer felt embarrassed to write about what was already "familiar to a reader in the 19th century". Mortimer addressed Holland's criticism by implying that Holland had failed to understand his approach, going as far as to call Holland's review "bizarre". Mortimer believed that Holland wanted it to be "semi-fictionalised", and explained that such an approach would trivialise a work intended to be useful to students and that would stand the "test of time".

== Sequels ==
The book has spawned the following sequels:

- The Time Traveller's Guide to Elizabethan England: a Handbook for Visitors to the Sixteenth Century was published in 2012 by Viking Press
- The Time Traveller's Guide to Restoration Britain: Life in the Age of Samuel Pepys, Isaac Newton and The Great Fire of London by The Bodley Head in 2017
- The Time Traveller's Guide to Regency Britain was published in 2020 by Random House

== Popular culture ==
Several prominent YouTube historians—such as Raffaello Urbani ("Metatron") and Skallagrim Nilsson—have produced videos about the book and endorsed it.
