= Sir Brook Bridges, 3rd Baronet =

British baronet and Whig politician

Sir Brook William Bridges, 3rd Baronet (17 September 1733 – 4 September 1791) was a British baronet and Whig politician.

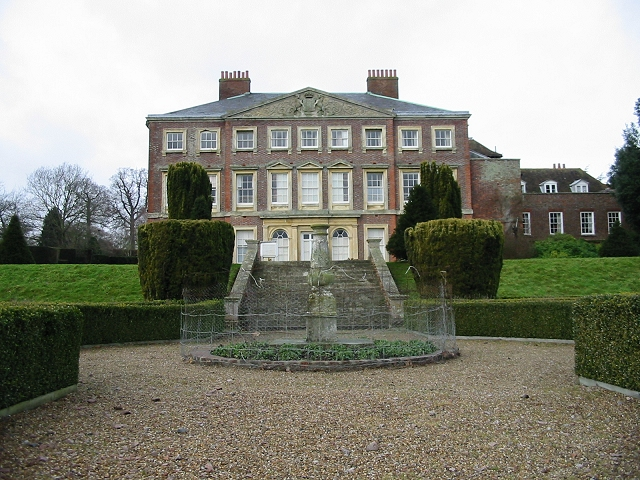
Goodnestone House- family seat of the Bridges family

Born at Whitehall, he was the only son of Sir Brook Bridges, 2nd Baronet by his first cousin and wife Elizabeth Palmer, daughter and co-heiress of Sir Thomas Palmer, 4th Baronet, of Wingham (her sisters Anne Palmer and Mary Palmer both married into Finch family). Born after his father's death and being the eldest son, he was born into the title and property of the baronetcy of Goodnestone Park in Kent.

== Education and career ==
Bridges was educated at Eton College and Trinity College, Cambridge until 1752 and began subsequently his Grand Tour. In 1763, he entered the British House of Commons for Kent, representing the constituency as Member of Parliament (MP) until 1774. He was for several years Receiver General of the land tax for Kent.

== Marriages and family ==
On 11 June 1765, he married Fanny Fowler, daughter of Edmund Fowler and heiress to the title Baron Fitzwalter, at St George's, Hanover Square in London. They had six daughters and seven sons.

- Sophia (d. 1844), who married Col. William Deedes MP for Hythe. They had at least four sons.
- Harriet Mary, who married Rev. George Moore, son of the Most Rev. John Moore, Archbishop of Canterbury. They had one son, Edward, who later married Lady Harriet Montagu-Scott, daughter of Charles Montagu-Scott, 4th Duke of Buccleuch.
- Brook (14 Aug 1766 – 9 Jul 1781)
- Sir Brook William, 4th Baronet (22 Jun 1767 – 21 Apr 1829), who married firstly Eleanor Foote with whom he had three children including Brook William Bridges, 1st Baron FitzWalter and Sir Brook George Bridges, 6th Baronet. He married secondly Dorothy Hawley, daughter of Sir Henry Hawley, 1st Baronet but without issue.
- Rev. Brook Henry (1 Jun 1769 – 20 Sep 1855), who married Jane Hales, daughter of Sir Thomas Hales, 4th Baronet. They had five children.
- Elizabeth (1773–1808), who married Edward Austen Knight, son of Rev. George Austen and older brother of Jane Austen (she visited them at Goodnestone regularly). They had eleven children.
- Rev. Brook Edward (1779-23 Apr 1825), who married Harriet Foote, sister to Eleanor. They had two sons. (This is the "Edward Bridges" mentioned in Jane Austen's letters and portrayed by Hugh Bonneville in Miss Austen Regrets.)

== Death and legacy ==
Bridges died, aged 57 in Portman Square in London and was buried in Goodnestone. He was succeeded in the baronetcy by his second son William, who after the death of his older brother in 1781 had taken the additional Christian name Brook by licence of the archbishop.

Parliament of Great Britain
Preceded by Robert Fairfax; Sir Wyndham Knatchbull-Wyndham	Member of Parliament for Kent; 1763 – 1774; With: Robert Fairfax 1763–1768; John Frederick Sackville 1768–1769; Sir Charles Farnaby 1769–1774	Succeeded by Charles Marsham; Thomas Knight
Baronetage of Great Britain
Preceded by Brook Bridges	Baronet (of Goodneston); 1733–1791	Succeeded by Brook William Bridges
