= Walter FitzWalter, 3rd Baron FitzWalter =

14th century English nobleman

Walter FitzWalter
- Baron FitzWalter
- Arms of Baron Fitzwalter: Or, a fess gules between two chevrons of the last.
- Born: 31 May 1345; Henham, Essex, England
- Died: 26 September 1386, (aged 41); Ourense, Galicia, Spain
- Noble family: FitzWalter
- Issue: Robert FitzWalter; Walter FitzWalter, 4th Baron FitzWalter
- Father: John FitzWalter, 2nd Baron FitzWalter
- Mother: Eleanor Percy

Walter FitzWalter, 3rd Baron FitzWalter (31 May 1345 – 26 September 1386) was an English soldier and nobleman.

== Biography ==
Walter was the son of John FitzWalter, 2nd Baron FitzWalter and Eleanor Percy, the second daughter of Henry Percy, 2nd Baron Percy. His father died in 1361, when Walter was identified as being 16 years old. In October 1366 he came of age and received his inheritance.

FitzWalter accompanied Sir Robert Knolles in leading a force of English troops in northwest France, where he was soon forced to seek refuge within the walls of Vaas Abbey. However, FitzWalter was attacked by Louis de Sancerre and a large French army. He was taken prisoner. The ransom forced Walter to mortgage his castle and Lordship of Egremont to Alice Perrers, the king's mistress. As a woman of her time, Alice was obliged to act through male agents, of whom the best-known Thomas de Thelwall, the Chancellor of the Duchy of Lancaster.

He served in John of Gaunt Spanish campaign of 1386, where he died at sea.

== Marriage and issue ==
He married firstly Eleanor, daughter of Thomas Dagworth and Eleanor de Bohun, Countess of Ormonde, and they are known to have had the following issue:

- Robert FitzWalter, his eldest son, predeceased his father and died childless.
- Walter FitzWalter, 4th Baron FitzWalter, his second son, married Joan Devereux, had issue.

His second marriage was to Philippa, daughter of John de Mohun and Joan Burghersh. This marriage did not provide any issue.

Peerage of England
Preceded by John FitzWalter	Baron FitzWalter; 1361–1386	Succeeded by Walter FitzWalter
