= Goodnestone, Dover =

Village in Kent, England

Coordinates: 51.2450°N 1.2295°E

Goodnestone
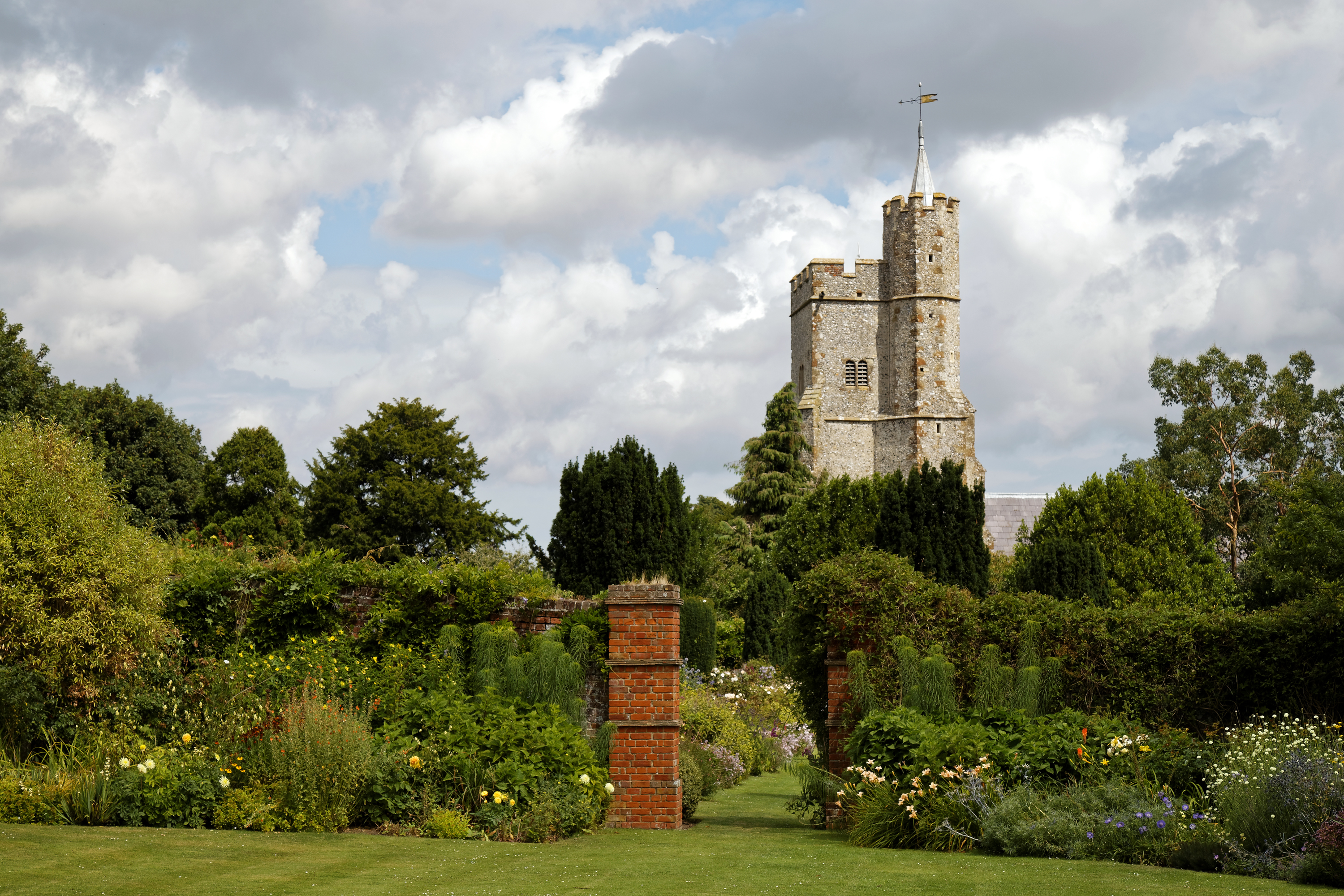
- Holy Cross Church from the Walled Garden of Goodnestone Park

- Location within Kent
- Population: 378 {2011 Census including Knowlton}
- OS grid reference: TR255545
  - London: 60 mi (97 km) ESE
- Civil parish: Goodnestone
- District: Dover
- Shire county: Kent
- Region: South East
- Country: England
- Sovereign state: United Kingdom
- Post town: Canterbury
- Postcode district: CT3
- Police: Kent
- Fire: Kent
- Ambulance: South East Coast
- UK Parliament: Herne Bay and Sandwich

Goodnestone is a village and civil parish in the Dover district of Kent, England. The village is situated approximately 7 miles (11 km) east-southeast from the city of Canterbury, and 5 miles (8 km) west-southwest from Sandwich. The civil parish also contains the villages of Chillenden and Knowlton, and the hamlets of Rowling and Tickenhurst.

Goodnestone's Grade I listed parish church of the Holy Cross is in the Diocese and Archdeaconry of Canterbury and the Deanery of East Bridge. The church is set adjacent to Goodnestone Park, and dates from the 12th century, with additions and alterations to the 19th. Hussey and Rickman rebuilt the nave, chancel, and south porch in 1839–41. Within the church chancel is a 1752 monument by Peter Scheemakers to Brook Bridges (died 1717), of Goodnestone Park. A curate of Holy Cross was Herbert James, the father of Cambridge academic and ghost story writer M. R. James, who was born at Goodnestone Parsonage in 1862.

== Goodnestone Park ==
At the south-west of the village is Goodnestone Park, a mansion with estate and gardens. Only the gardens are open to the public. The home was built in 1704 by Brook Bridges, 1st Baronet. Elizabeth, the daughter of the 1st Baronet's grandson Sir Brook Bridges, 3rd Baronet, married Jane Austen's brother. Austen visited her brother and Elizabeth at the estate regularly during their early married life.
