= Robert FitzWalter, 1st Baron FitzWalter =

English administrator, soldier and politician

- Arms of Robert FitzWalter, 1st Baron Fitzwalter: Or, a fess gules between two chevrons of the last
- Born: 1247; Henham, Essex, Kingdom of England
- Died: 18 January 1326 (aged 78–79)
- Spouses: Devorguille de Burgh; Eleanor Ferrers; Alice de Montfort
- Issue: Walter FitzWalter; Sir Robert FitzWalter; Christina FitzWalter; Blanche Fitzwalter; Ida Fitzwalter; Denise Fitzwalter; Mary Fitzwalter
- Father: Sir Walter FitzWalter
- Mother: Ida Longespée

Robert FitzWalter, 1st Baron FitzWalter (1247 – 18 January 1326) was an English landowner, soldier, administrator and politician.

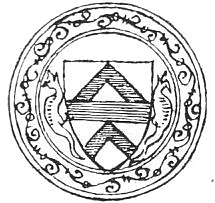
Drawing (1611) of seal of Robert FitzWalter appended to the Barons' Letter, 1301

== Origins ==
Robert Fitzwalter was the only surviving son of Sir Walter FitzWalter, of Woodham Walter in Essex (son of Robert FitzWalter), and his wife Ida II Longespée (born after 1225), daughter or granddaughter of William Longespée, 3rd Earl of Salisbury, illegitimate son of Henry II.

== Career ==
In 1258 his wardship was granted to his uncle, Sir Stephen Longespée (who was at least 12 years younger than he was). He came of age in 1268, and was knighted in 1274. In 1275, he had licence to sell Baynard's Castle in London to Robert Kilwardby, Archbishop of Canterbury. In 1277, and again in 1282, he took part in the wars in Wales. in February 1281, he was preparing to make a pilgrimage to Santiago de Compostela. In May 1286, he accompanied Edward I to France. On 28 June 1293, he was appointed Constable of Castell y Bere in Merionethshire, and in July of that year, of Hadleigh Castle in Essex.

In August 1294, he was preparing to go to Gascony on the king's service, and was in Gascony from 1296 to 1297. On 22 July 1298, he fought at the Battle of Falkirk. In 1298, he was granted a weekly fair and market at his manor in Roydon, Essex, and on 12 April 1299, was appointed Captain and Keeper of the Peace in that county. In 1300, he was at the siege of Caerlaverock Castle, and in 1303 and 1306, saw service in Scotland.

He was summoned to military service, to the coronation of Edward II, to various councils, and to Parliament by writs directed Roberto filio Walteri, 'whereby he is held to have become Lord FitzWalter'. On 12 February 1301 he was among the barons who signed a letter intended to be sent to Pope Boniface VIII, repudiating his claim of feudal overlordship of Scotland. On 9 October 1306, he was pardoned of all debts owed to the king. In April 1310, he and his third wife, Alice, intended a pilgrimage to Jerusalem. In February 1317, he was again preparing for a pilgrimage, and, in November of that year, was granted custody of the town of Colchester, Essex. In June 1320, he was preparing to travel beyond the seas with Edward II. On 6 August 1320, he was exempted from future military service.

On 17 January 1326, immediately prior to his death, he had licence to enfeoff his son, Robert, with two manors.

He died on 19 January 1326, and was succeeded in the barony by Sir Robert FitzWalter, his son by his second marriage, his son Walter FitzRobert by his first marriage having predeceased him in 1293.

== Family ==
He first married, in 1259, Devorguille de Burgh (c. 1256 – 1284), elder daughter and coheiress of Sir John de Burgh (d. before 3 March 1280) of Wakerley, Northamptonshire, and Cecily de Balliol, sister of John de Balliol, King of Scots, and daughter of Sir John de Balliol of Barnard Castle, Durham, by whom he had a son and two daughters:

- Walter FitzRobert (1275–1293), son and heir apparent, who married, in 1286, Joan d'Engaine (also d'Engayne) (d. 1 June 1315), daughter of Sir John d'Engaine of Colne Engaine, Essex, by whom he had a son, Robert, who died young, predeceasing him. He died without surviving issue in 1293 at Dunmow Priory, and was buried there. His widow married, in or before 1296, Adam de Welles, 1st Baron Welles (d. 1 September 1311), by whom she had three sons, Robert de Welles, 2nd Baron Welles, Adam de Welles, 3rd Baron Welles, and Sir John de Welles, and three daughters, Margaret and Cecily, both of whom became nuns, and a third daughter who married a husband surnamed Mablethorpe.
- Christian de Burgh, who married William Marshal, 1st Baron Marshal (d. 24 June 1314).
- Blanche Fitzwalter, a nun at Barking Abbey.

FitzWalter's first wife, Devorguille, died in 1284, and was buried at Dunmow Priory.

He married secondly, before 11 March 1290, in the king's chapel at Westminster, Eleanor de Ferrers, daughter of Robert de Ferrers, 6th Earl of Derby, and his second wife, Eleanor de Bohun, daughter of Sir Humphrey de Bohun (d. 27 October 1265) and Eleanor de Brewes, by whom he had a son and three daughters:

- Sir Robert Fitzwalter (1300 – 6 May 1328), who married firstly Joan Botetourt, daughter of John Botetourt, 1st Baron Botetourt, and secondly Joan de Multon (d. 16 June 1363), eldest daughter of Thomas de Multon, 1st Baron Multon of Egremont (1276–1322).
- Ida Fitzwalter, who married firstly Sir Robert de la Warde, and secondly Hugh de Neville, 1st Baron Neville.
- Denise Fitzwalter.
- Mary Fitzwalter.

Fitzwalter's second wife, Eleanor, was buried at Dunmow Priory.

He married thirdly, after 10 May 1308, Alice de Montfort, widow of Sir Warin de Lisle (d. before 7 December 1296) (by whom she was the mother of Robert de Lisle, 1st Baron Lisle (d. 4 January 1343), owner of the Lisle Psalter), and daughter of Sir Peter de Montfort (d. 1287) of Beaudesert Castle, Warwickshire, by Maud de la Mare, daughter of Sir Henry de la Mare.

== Notes ==
Peerage of England
New creation	Baron FitzWalter; 1295–1325	Succeeded by Robert FitzWalter
