= Sir Brook Bridges, 1st Baronet =

British barrister

Sir Brook Bridges, 1st Baronet, FRS (12 August 1679 – 16 March 1728) was a British barrister.

He was the son of Brook Bridges and Mary Lewen. Brook Bridges senior had held the office of Auditor of the Imprest of the Treasury from 1672 to 1705.

Brook Bridges junior inherited Goodnestone Park in 1717 on the death of his father, who had bought the estate in 1705. He was admitted to Middle Temple on 25 April 1713 and created 1st Baronet Bridges, of Goodneston, on 19 April 1718.

He was elected a Fellow of the Royal Society in 1726.

== Family ==
He married twice; firstly Margaret Marsham, the daughter of Sir Robert Marsham, 4th Baronet and Margaret Bosville, on 23 June 1707, with whom he had two children:

- Margaret Bridges
- Sir Brook Bridges, 2nd Baronet (12 Mar 1708 – 23 May 1733)

and secondly Mary Hales, daughter of Sir Thomas Hales, 2nd Baronet and Mary Pym, before 1724.

Baronetage of Great Britain
New creation	Baronet (of Goodneston); 1718–1728	Succeeded by Brook Bridges
