= Thomas Thursby (d. 1543) =

Thomas Thursby (1487–1543) of Ashwicken was a notorious land encloser in Norfolk in the 1510s–1540s.

== Life ==
He was the son of Thomas Thursby (d.1510), merchant, three times Mayor of King's Lynn and the founder and benefactor of Thoresby College.

The great wealth inherited to him by his father enabled him to amass large tracts of arable land, which he then enclosed, turning out the landless peasants who had hereto lived there. It also meant a serious threat against their livelihood, the common ground previously having been available to grazing for the livestock of everyone. The Norfolk Heritage writes about one of these villages, Holt:

This is the site of the medieval village of Holt, which disappeared when the landlord, the notorious Thomas Thursby, enclosed the land and converted it to pasture for his sheep. Holt was the only Norfolk village recorded in the Commission of Inquiry in 1517 as being totally depopulated in this way.

All Saints Church, Ashwicken, Leziate & Bawsey in the Diocese of Norwich, concurs:

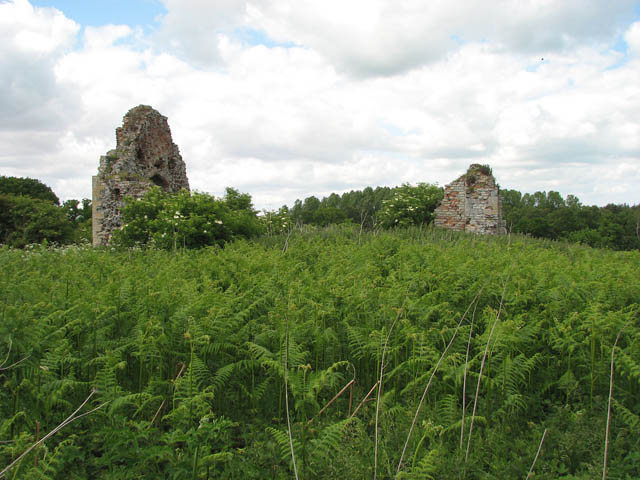
The Ruined St Michael's Church, Mintlyn

There are two hamlets within the parish and they are Leziate and Ashwicken, both these settlements are described as "a shrunken village". During the medieval period the village of Leziate was much larger, but the village had shrunk sufficiently by the late 15th century for the parish of Leziate to be united with Ashwicken. The name Leziate comes from the Old English meaning meadow gate, while the name Ashwicken is also derived from Old English and means either place at the dwellings or buildings or place at the ash trees. During the medieval period there was another settlement within the parish. It was called Holt. The village was demolished when the landlord, the notorious Thomas Thursby, enclosed the land and converted it to pasture for his sheep. Holt was the only Norfolk village recorded in the Commission of Inquiry in 1517 as being totally depopulated in this way. And so each village, especially Ashwicken, is much smaller than previously and the Church at Ashwicken stands alone in the landscape. It is known as "Our Church in the Fields". The Church of Leziate has disappeared and Bawsey remains a ruin along with Mintlyn.

His dealings were part of an inquest which took place in 1517, he was sued in the Court of Requests by the inhabitants of Middleton in 1540, and a case was made against him in 1549, years after was he was long dead, for enclosing the salt fen that had always been common to Middleton, but also used by Runcton, West Winch, Setchey and Hardwick.

K.J. Allison writes in The Sheep-Corn Husbandry of Norfolk in the Sixteenth and Seventeenth Centuries that the Norfolk landlords committed manifold abuses of the foldcourse system. And that those abuses were frequently accompanied by the acquisition of houses, landholdings, and commons, and how 'large estates were built up, and villages were depopulated.' K.J. Allison notes that, 'There is a considerable body of evidence to support the poor petitioners' allegations'. K.J. Allison makes a special note of 'the tenants of the notorious Thomas Thursby' and describes how he had converted their holdings to sheep pasture, evicted them from their dwellings, deprived them of their commons, and pulled down their houses in numerous villages, and also mentions the lost villages, 'including four that are now deserted.'

== Ashwicken ==
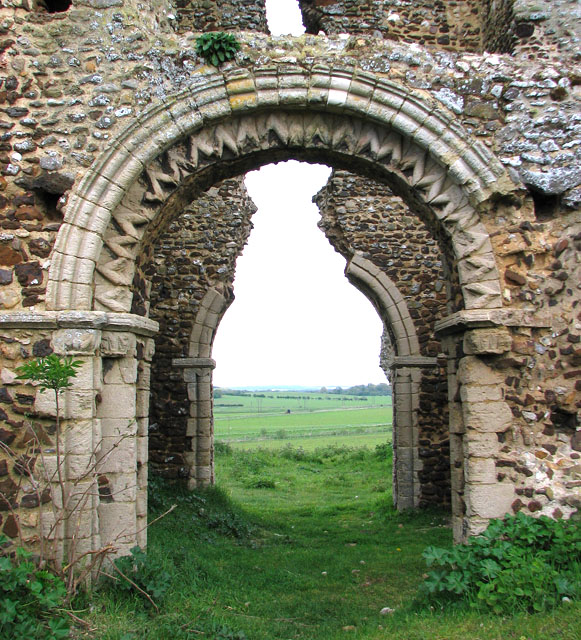
The Ruined Church of St James in Bawsey

Before 31 May 1527 Thomas Thursby bought the manor of Ashwicken. Ashwicken had previously belonged to another branch of the Thursby family, the grandson of his uncle Robert Thursby, his cousin also named Thomas Thursby (1498–1532). This other branch migrated to Essex.

== Mintlyn, Geyton Thorp, Gayton, Congham, and Rydon ==
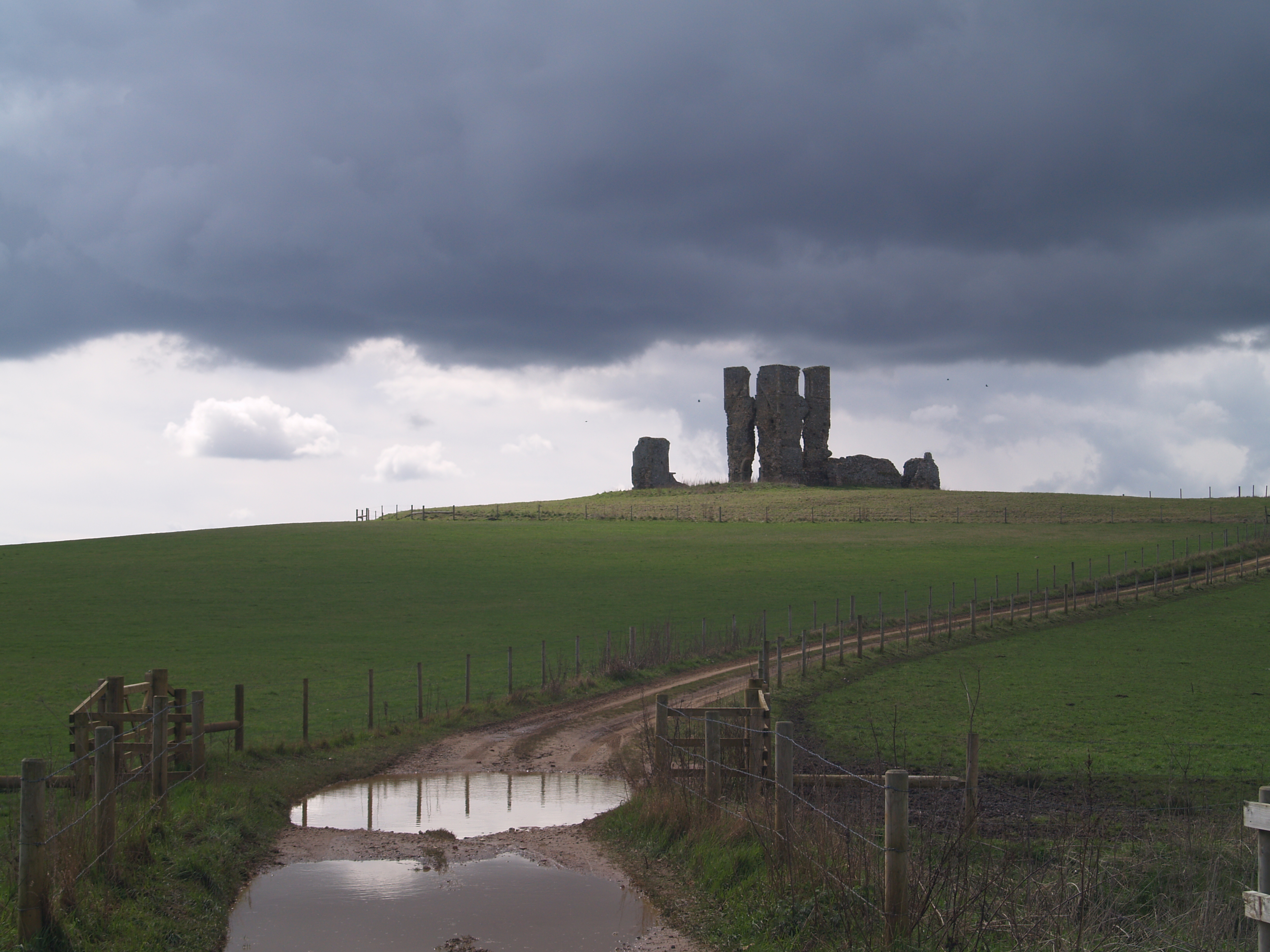
The deserted village of Bawsey. Several villages are documented to have existed in this area until at least up to the 16th century. It was during that period that the then landowner - Thomas Thursby and his son - evicted their tenants by pulling down their dwellings and depriving them of their commons in order to turn the area into farmland that was converted to sheep pasture in numerous villages (four of which now lost), reminiscent of the Clearances in Scotland. The small settlement of Bawsey was destroyed by enclosures in the early 16th century and a century later the church, now in ruins, had started to deteriorate.

He inherited Mintlyn, Geyton Thorp, Gayton, Congham, and Rydon from his father. In a tax assessment of 1524 Thomas Thursby, Esq. is listed as the wealthiest landowner in Gayton. There is a reference in the record of a lawsuit in the Court of Star Chamber during the reign of Henry VIII to Thomas Thursby's 'mansion place' in Gayton. The manors of Rustons and Redehall, moiety of manor of Bawdsey and all possessions in Gayton, Gaytonthorpe, Congham, Rydon, Bawsey, Walton, and Rysing was settled on his wife-to-be Anne Knyvett in their marriage settlement of 31 May 1527. The manor of Rysyng was in the hands of the Crown as part of the duchy of Cornwall, but had been let in 1516 for twenty-one years to Thomas Thursby, of Bishop's Lynne, for 50/. The manors of Rustons and Redehall and possessions Gayton, Gaytonthorpe and Rydon were inherited by his son Edmund.

In an inquiry of 1517, Thomas Thursby, lord of the manor of Gayton, was accused of enclosing arable lands in Ashwicken, Leizate and Bawsey, as well as depopulating the hamlet of Holt in the parish of Mintlyn.

Thomas Thursbye of Gayton, esquire, alias of Lynn, merchant, was involved in a suit with Juliana, the widow of Sir Robert Norwich (d.1535), Chief Justice of the Common Pleas in 1538–1544.

== Thoresby College ==
As the son of Thomas Thursby (d.1510), the founder of Thoresby College, he had interaction with the Mayor and burgesses regarding his father's will and its conditions:

By Thomas Thorysby of Mintling, esquire, to the Mayor and burgesses to convey to them four pieces of pasture in Gaywood which were given to them by the will of Thorysby's father Thomas on condition that the Mayor and burgesses appoint a priest as master of the Charnel to instruct 6 poor children in grammar and song but were re-entered by Thorysby because the conditions were infringed. The Mayor and burgesses undertake to appoint the priest to celebrate mass in the Charnel chapel at the west end of St Margaret's church and instruct the 6 children, 1 October 1543.

== The Dispute of the Salt Fen ==
After the dissolution the Haveless lands were bought by Thomas Thoresby, presumably on 23 August 1540, and he came into conflict with the men of Middleton over the ownership of Salt Fen situated between Middleton and Haveless. He is described as a country gentleman. This dispute was not isolated. He was accused before the Star Chamber in 1535 of attacks on Adam and Ann Foster of Gayton in a dispute over lands and similarly in 1537 for assaults on Nicholas Gurling of Grimston.

Thoresby, dead by the time the complaint was made, had enclosed eight years before, that is in 1540, a year after Lynn Priory was dissolved. Depositions were taken on 25 April 1549 before Sir Nicholas Lestrange, Sir Thomas Hollys, Edward Beawpre and John Dethyk.

Edmund Beaupré of the Beauprés of Beaupré Hall was the guardian of Thomas Thursby's relative Edward Thursby of Doreward's Hall during his minority from 1541.

== Anne of Cleves ==
He was probably the Thomas Thursby who received Anne of Cleves at Rochester on New Year's Eve together with his uncle-by-marriage the Duke of Norfolk and his brothers-in-law Sir Edmund Knyvett, Sir William Coningsby and Thomas Gibbon, and such Norfolk neighbours as Sir James Boleyn and Sir Thomas Lestrange.

His future daughter-in-law, Mary Neville, Lady Dacre was one of the ladies appointed to receive Anne of Cleves when she arrived in England.

== Sheriff of Cambridgeshire and Huntingdonshire ==
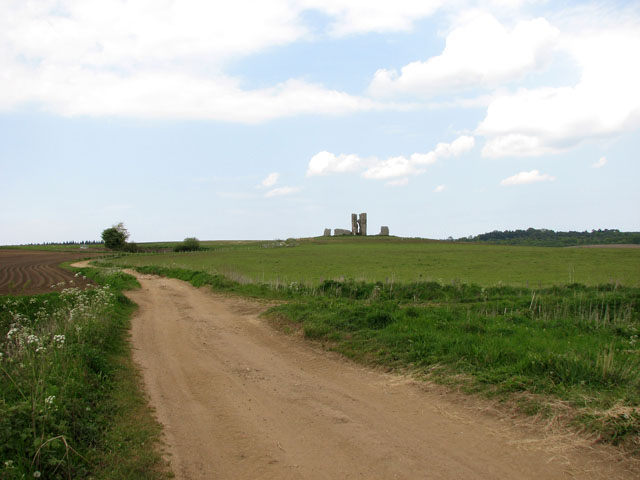
Track North of Church Road – The Deserted Village of Bawsey

He may have been the Thomas Thursby of Caxton, Cambridgeshire who was Sheriff of Cambridgeshire and Huntingdonshire for a year from 9 November 1513. By 1509, Caxton was held by the sisters Margaret née Burgoyne (d.1529), wife of George Heveningham (d.1530), and Elizabeth Burgoyne (d.1532+), wife of Thomas Thursby of Norfolk. His first cousin once removed by the same name would in 1513 have been a boy of 15, and therefore unlikely to have been sheriff. Like with Ashwicken, it is possible that this Thomas Thursby (d.1543) bought Caxton from his relatives. It is found again as the property of the grandson of this Thomas Thursby (d.1543) also called Thomas Thursby (d.1633) in 1578.

== Marriage ==
He married Anne Knyvett, lady in waiting to Queen Katherine of Aragon. Marriage preparations were under way 31 May 1527. Anne Knyvett was the daughter of Sir Thomas Knyvett and his wife Muriel, widow of John Grey, 2nd Viscount Lisle, and daughter of Thomas Howard, 2nd Duke of Norfolk and Elizabeth Tilney. She was the sister of Sir Edmund Knyvett and a first cousin of Anne Boleyn and Katherine Howard. Through her mother's first marriage Anne Knyvett was also the sister of Elizabeth Grey, Viscountess Lisle, who was at one time betrothed to Charles Brandon, 1st Duke of Suffolk and later the wife of Henry Courtenay. Anne Thorysby is one of the witnesses of Cecily Aylmer's will in 1541. After Thomas Thursby's death in 1543, Anne Knyvett remarried by license dated 26 January 1543/4 to Henry Spelman, the son of Sir John Spelman (d.1546) and the father of Sir Henry Spelman and of Erasmus Spelman, whose son Henry went to Virginia.

== Children ==
Children of Thomas Thursby:

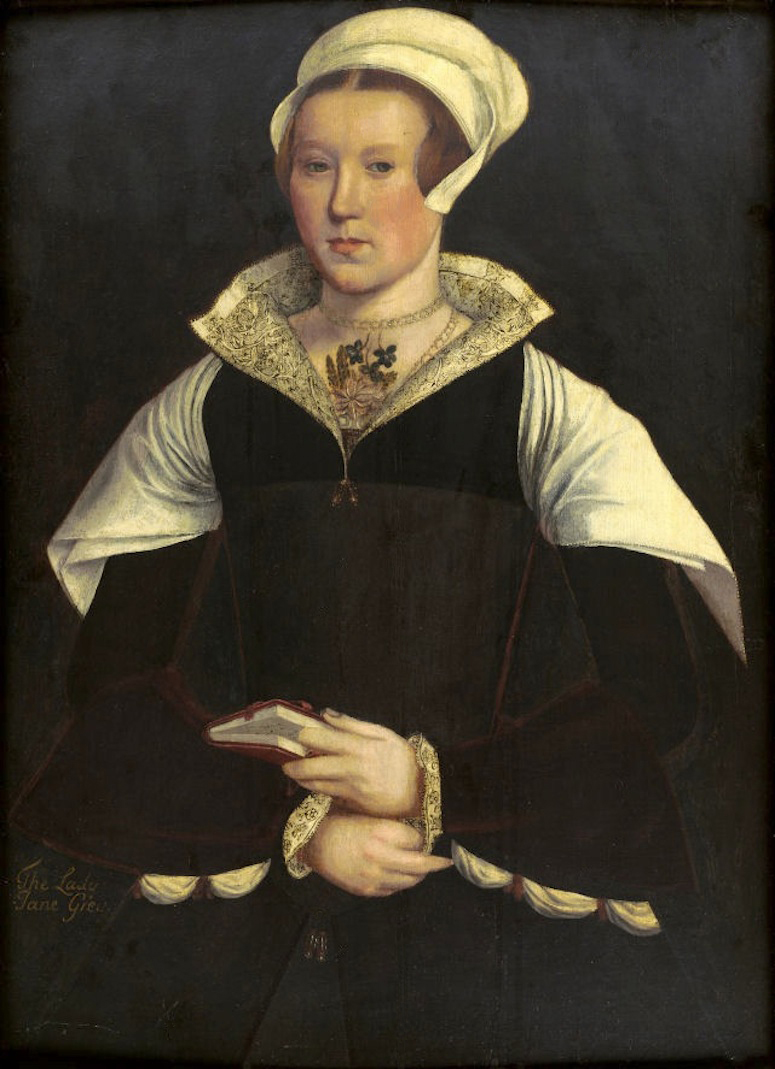
- The Wrest Part Portrait – Recently identified as Mary Neville Fiennes, Lady Dacre
  Edmund (d.1547), m. Ursula (d.1567), daughter of Sir Edward Beynton of the Vyse in Wiltshire, Knight, who remarried to Erasmus Spelman, and had John Spilman, Henry Spelman, Thomas Spelman, Bridget, Ele, Alice and Dorothy. Edmund Thursby and Ursula Beynton had Thomas Thursby, of age c.1565, still living in 1579. Probably the Thomas Thursby who married Mary Barlow of Slewinge, the daughter of Roger Barlow of Slewinge and Jylian Dew, and niece of William Barlow, Bishop of Chichester, by license dated 17 March 1574/5. The will of Thomas Thoresby of Ashwicken (d.1633) was proven 17 December 1633. They had Edmund Thoresby of Haveles in Mintlyng, who married 1) Ann, daughter of Robert Spring of Icklingham; 2) Jane, daughter of Thomas Astley; 3) Susan, daughter of Edmund Jermyn, Francis who died s.p., will proven 1608, Thomas and Wingfield.
- Francis Thursby of Congham, under 20 in 1543, mentioned in his brother Edmund's will dated 20 December 1547, the third husband of Mary Neville Fiennes, Lady Dacre, with whom he had six children. This Thursby family owned property in Congham. Mary Neville Fiennes, Lady Dacre is the sitter in two famous portraits, one by Hans Eworth, misidentified as Frances Brandon, Duchess of Suffolk, for centuries, the other as her daughter Lady Jane Grey. Her portrait still hangs in Parliament.
- Mary, married Geoffrey Cobbs (d.1544), the son of William Cobb of Gayton, the grandson of William Cobb of Sandringham and the daughter and heiress of Ralph Gayton, and the great grandson of William Cobb of Sandringham in Norfolk, and Margaret, the daughter of Sir John le Buttler, knight, and had: Thomas Cobbs (b. 1539), eldest son and heir, William Cobbs, Ann, and Dowsabell.

== Last will and testament ==
The will of Thomas Thorresby of Hautbois, Norfolk was dated 24 October 1543 and proven 13 February 1543/4. In it he mentions his wife Anne and his sons Edmund and Francis, and his daughter Mary, the wife of Geoffrey Cobbs.
