= Thomas Thursby =

English merchant (died 1510)

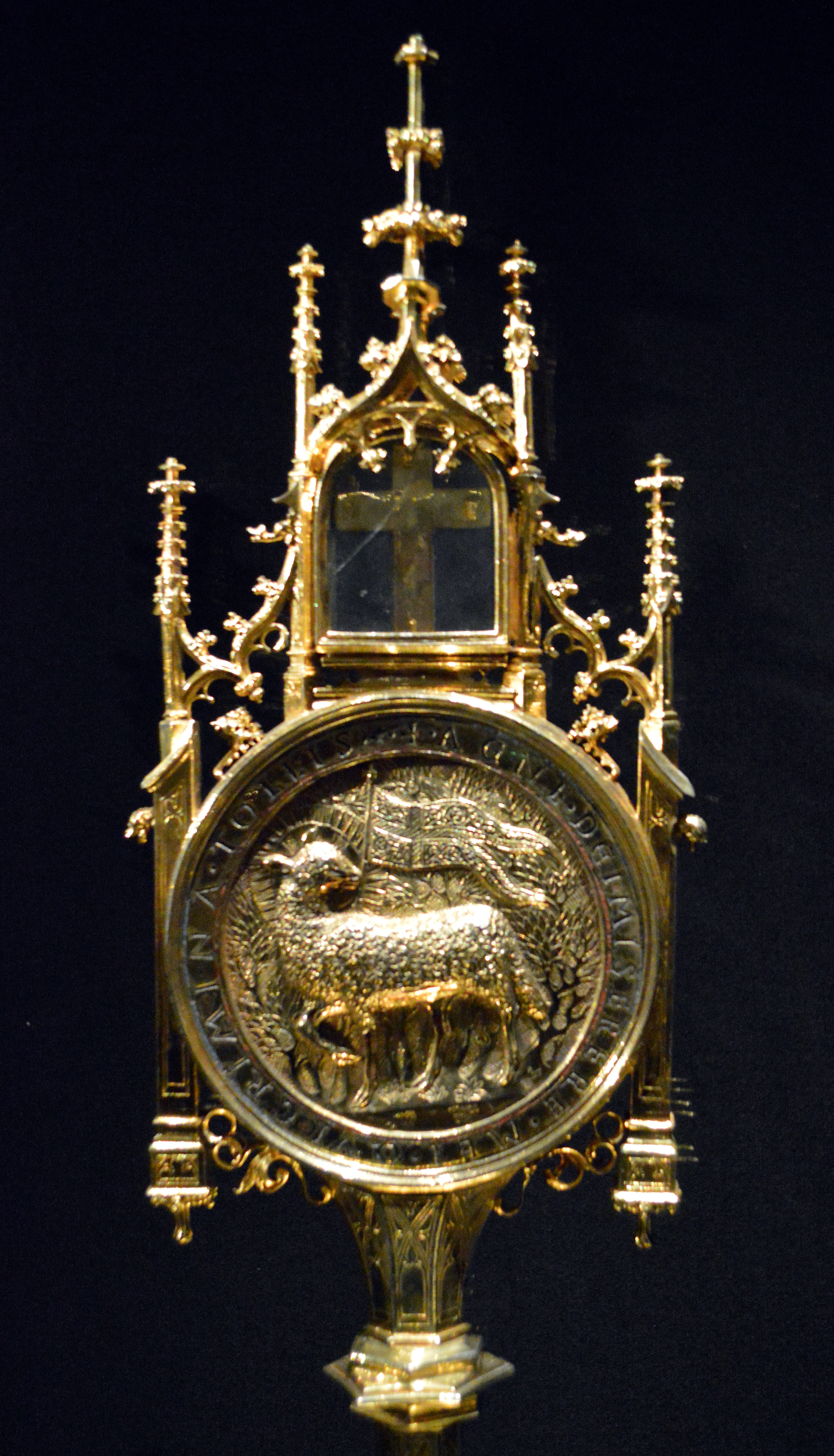
Agnus Dei

Thomas Thursby (died 9 August 1510), was a merchant, thrice Mayor of King's Lynn and the founder and benefactor of Thoresby College. He was the son of Henry Thursby, four times Mayor of Lynn and Burgess for Lynn, in turn the son of John Thursby, Mayor of Lynn Regis 1425 and Deputy-Mayor 1435. Thomas' brother, Robert Thursby, was Burgess for Lynn 1462–3, 1482–3 and 1487, holding the manors of Ashwicken and Burg's Hall in Hillington before his death, 29 October 1500.

In his will he leaves 'my special good lord of Oxenford', John de Vere, 13th Earl of Oxford, a tabernacle of our Lady of gold.

At the time of his death, he was married to Elizabeth (d.1518), the widow of Robert Aylmer (d.1493) Mayor of Norwich.

Elizabeth is not the daughter of John Burgoyne who in the Visitations of Cambridgeshire marries 'Thomas Thorseby of Norfolk', as that Elizabeth is still alive and apparently a wife in 1528, when she receives an inheritance from her mother Margaret. Elizabeth Burgoyne is probably the Isabel, late the wife of Thomas Thursby, who is involved in a suit in 1532–38. Isabel and Elizabeth were considered the same name in the period.

It is probably this couple, her husband's grand-nephew and his wife, Elizabeth refers to in her will, in which she gives Thomas Thursby a silver and gilt Agnus Dei with holy wax therein, and to his wife a silver and gilt image of our lady.

One possibility is that Elizabeth is the daughter of the Sir William Knyvett with whom she was involved in a suit seemingly shortly after the death of her first husband in 1493. He had two daughters named Elizabeth, one from each of his two first wives. The youngest is likely the one who also died in 1518, while in the household of Edward Stafford, 3rd Duke of Buckingham, as the Duke refers to her as 'my cousin'. The two were related through her mother, Lady Joan Stafford. Sir William was known to show favouritism towards the children of his second marriage at the expense of those of his first.

Francis Blomefield saw a north isle window in St. Laurence's Church, Norwich, commemorating Elizabeth's three husbands, bearing the inscription:

Orate pro bono statu Thome Thirsby, et Eliz. Ur. et pro aiab: Johis: et Rob. Aylmer quondam maiorum Civitatis Norwici

== Name confusion ==
There were four Thomas Thursbys in the same geographical area in the same time period, which has through the centuries made unambiguous identification challenging. These were in addition to this Thomas Thursby (d.1510), his son by the same name (d.1543), his grand-nephew Thomas Thursby (1498–1532) and his son a great-grand-nephew Thomas Thursby of Bocking (d.1541).

== Controversy ==
The confusion between which Thomas Thursby is which attains some degree of seriousness because one of them was a rather sinister character.

The Lowestoft Archaeological and Local History Society sums it up thus:

Farming practices. Partly as a result of falls in population and partly in response to the demand for wool, there was a change from the traditional three-field system, which required a lot of labour, to grazing sheep. Richard gave several examples of “flockmasters”. These were men who bought up land that had once been open arable fields and converted it into enclosed sheep pasture. Thomas Thursby (1450-1510) was one of the most well documented as he was mayor of King's Lynn several times, also Lord of the Manor of Gayton and an ancestor of Prince William through the Spencer family. Others were Henry Fermur in Thorpland, William Day in Alethorpe, Edmund Jermyn in Sturston, and William Fermur (son of Sir Henry) in Pudding Norton. The behaviour of these, and others like them, towards the landless peasants was often very poor and one of the main causes leading to Robert Kett's rebellion in 1549.

This same person was responsible for the disappearance of the medieval villages of Holt and Cecily Aylmer's Myntlynge, Mintlyn. The landlord Thomas Thursby was accused of appropriating most of the common land for himself, by enclosing it and converting it to pasture for his sheep, and of evicting tenants from their homes before demolishing them.

Many sources, like the above one does, today identify him with the Thomas Thursby who was Mayor of King's Lynn in 1502 and died in 1510.

M.J. Medlar, however, in The Gaywood River Valley in the Post-Medieval Period writes:

Nationally, especially in the Midlands, there was a trend for large landowners of small communities to depopulate the villages and convert the arable to enclosed pasture for large flocks of sheep. Sheep farming, relying on only a few shepherds, was much cheaper to operate than arable farming, and the late fifteenth century was a prosperous time for the wool and cloth trade of England. Norfolk landowners also followed this pattern - the most famous being the Townshends of Raynham and the Fermors of East Barsham, who owned huge flocks in the Fakenham area. In an inquiry of 1517, Thomas Thursby, lord of the manor of Gayton, was accused of enclosing arable lands in Ashwicken, Leizate and Bawsey, as well as depopulating the hamlet of Holt in the parish of Mintlyn. Frequently, only one farm in a parish survived this type of enclosure, and this appears to be what happened in Bawsey, Ashwicken and Leizate. A map of about 1690 shows there were still approximately ten houses in Mintlyn, and even the modern Ordnance Survey maps record Mintlyn Farm close to the ruined church, and White House Farm near a moated site in the south-east of the parish

Since this inquest took place in 1517, they would have had some difficulty in summoning the Thomas Thursby who died in 1510. As for the encloser, there is some definite proof as to who this character was:

Thoresby, dead by the time the complaint was made, had enclosed eight years before, that is in 1540, a year after Lynn Priory was dissolved. Depositions were taken on 25 April 1549 before Sir Nicholas Lestrange, Sir Thomas Hollys, Edward Beawpre and John Dethyk.

This points to his son, Thomas Thursby, who died in 1543, and variously inherited, owned and bought the above-mentioned properties which were raized.

== Last will and testament ==
The will of Thomas Thursby, Burgess and Merchant of Lynn Bishop, Norfolk, was dated 3 May 1510, sealed 2 June 1510 and proven 23 October 1510.

In it, he desires burial in St. Margaret's Church of Lynne, next to his father's tomb:

my body to be buried in the holy burial at the north end of our Ladies altar, which I caused to be made adjoining to the place where my father lyeth buried in the Church of Saint Margaret, of Lynne, aforesaid. Item: I will that there be made a tomb of marble over the same place where I shall lie, at the end of the said altar, by the discretion of my executors. Item: I bequeath to the high altar of the same Church of Saint Margaret, for my tithes negligently forgotten in my life £6 13s. 4d

He died on 9 August 1510.

His executors were his son, Thomas Thursby, his sons-in-law Francis Mountford, Thomas Guybon and William Trewe, his step-son Richard Aylmer and his nephew John Fincham of Welle.

== Children ==
In his will, he mentions the following children:

- Thomas Thursby (d. 1543), m. Anne Knyvett, lady in waiting to Katherine of Aragon, in 1527. Anne Knyvett was the daughter of Sir Thomas Knyvett and his wife Muriel, widow of John Grey, 2nd Viscount Lisle, and daughter of Thomas Howard, 2nd Duke of Norfolk. Anne Knyvett remarried to Henry Spelman, the son of Sir John Spelman
- Margery, married name Gryndell, who had the son John Gryndell (b.bef.1510)
- Elizabeth, married before 1510 to Thomas Gibbon (Guybon) (1470/71–1531), of West Lynn, Norfolk
- Elyn
- Beatrice, who married firstly William Trew (d. 1510/12) of Lynn and secondly William Coningsby (by 1483–1540) of the Inner Temple, London and Lynn, Norfolk
- Margaret, the wife of Francis Mountford (1474/76–1536) of the Inner Temple, London and Feltwell, Norfolk.

According to Miscellanea genealogica Thomas Thursby was married several times, so there is some uncertainty as to who the mother of his children was. If the birth date given for his son of the same name, 1487, is correct, he cannot possibly be the son of Elizabeth, as she was still the wife of Robert Aylmer (d.1493) then.

== Other family ==
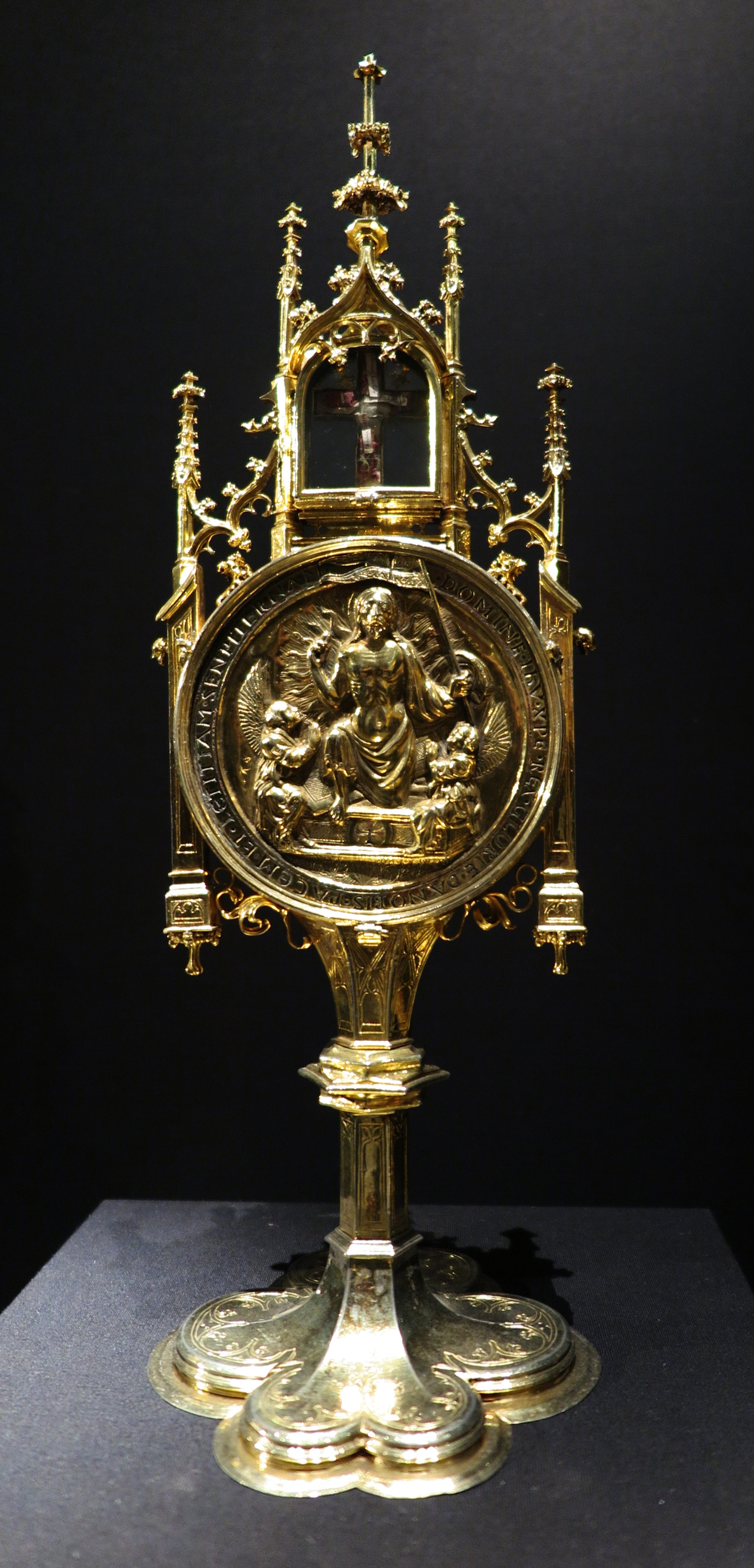
Agnus Dei

Thomas Thursby (d.1510) had a brother, Robert Thursby, whose son, Henry Thursby (1476–1506) married Ellen (b.1477), daughter and coheir of Thomas Fotheringhay and niece and coheiress of John Doreward. They had two sons, Thomas Thursby (1498–1532) and Henry. This Thomas Thursby married Elizabeth or Isabel, daughter of John Burgoyne, and had a son also named Thomas Thursby of Bocking (d.1541), who at his death left behind a small son called Edward. This other branch migrated to Essex, as a result of an inheritance from Ellen Fotheringhay's Doreward relatives.

The Thomas Thursby his widow Elizabeth leaves a silver and gilt Agnus Dei with holy wax therein, and to his wife a silver and gilt image of our lady in 1518, was probably his great-grandnephew Thomas Thursby (1498–1532) and his wife Elizabeth Burgoyne. The two were married by 1509.
