= Thomas Knyvett =

15th-16th c English nobleman; Master of the Horse to Henry III

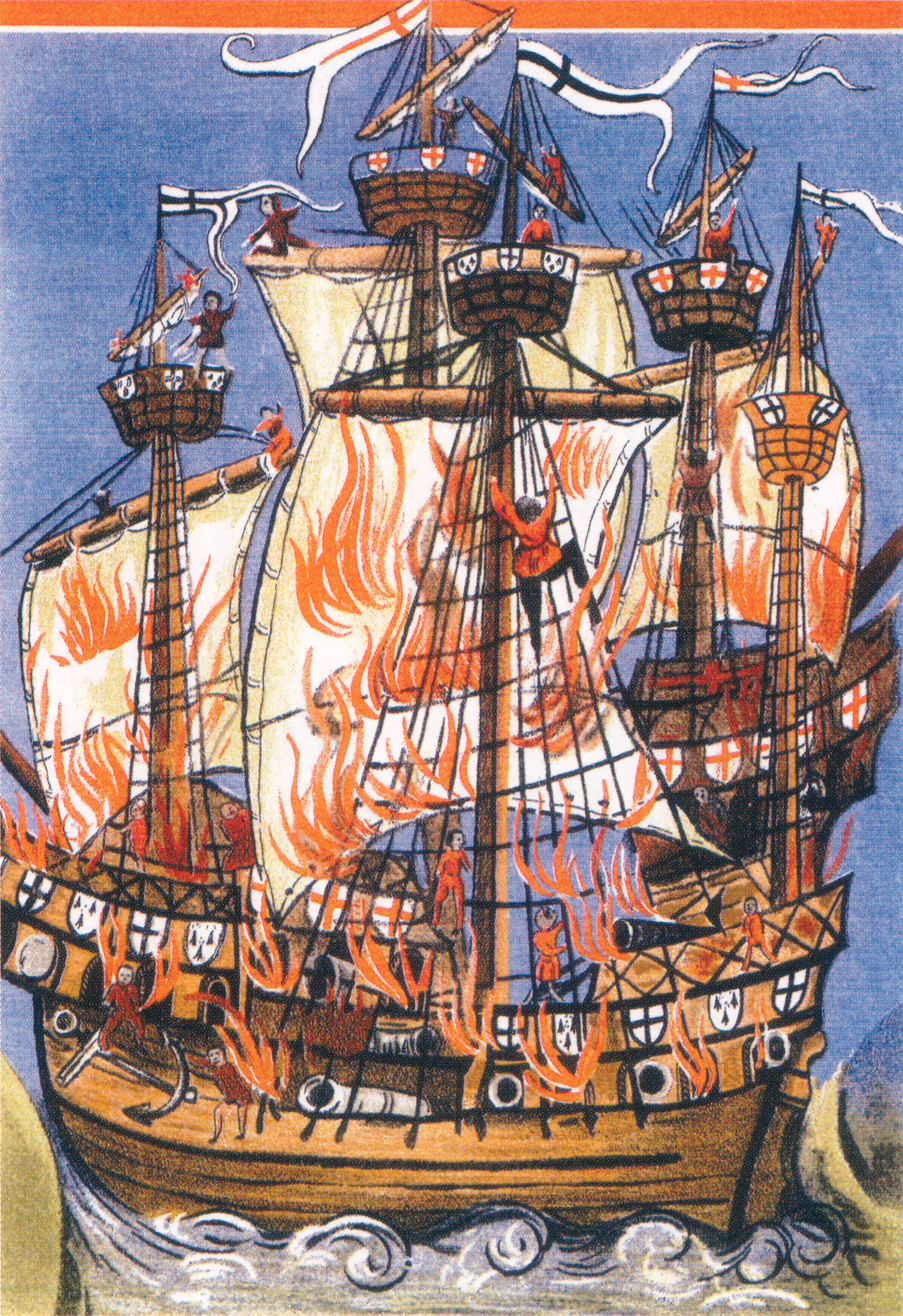
A contemporary image of the Cordeliere (bearing the Flag of Brittany) and Regent (with the Flag of England) on fire. Illustration to the poem Chordigerae navis conflagratio by Germain de Brie.

Sir Thomas Knyvett (also Knevitt or Knivet or Knevet), of Buckenham, Norfolk (c. 1485 – 10 August 1512) was a young English nobleman who was a close associate of King Henry VIII shortly after the monarch came to the throne. According to Hall's Chronicle, Knyvett was a frequent participant in the jousts and pageants of the new king's glittering court and was made Henry's Master of the Horse in 1510.

== Family ==
Sir Thomas Knyvett was the son of Sir Edmund Knyvett (d.1504) of Buckenham by his wife Eleanor Tyrrell, the daughter of Sir William Tyrrell of Gipping, Suffolk by Margaret, daughter of Robert Darcy, knight. His mother Eleanor was sister of Sir James Tyrrell.

=== Spousal connections ===
Knyvett married, before 9 July 1506, Muriel Howard, the widow of John Grey, 2nd Viscount Lisle, by whom she was the mother of Elizabeth Grey, Viscountess Lisle, who was at one time betrothed to Charles Brandon, 1st Duke of Suffolk and later the wife of Henry Courtenay. Muriel Howard was the daughter of Thomas Howard, 2nd Duke of Norfolk, and Elizabeth Tilney, and through the Howard connection, Knyvett was related to many of the great figures of English history (his brother-in-law, for example, was Thomas Boleyn, father of Queen Anne, and grandfather of Queen Elizabeth I). Their children were first cousins to both Queen Anne Boleyn and Queen Katherine Howard.

== Descendants ==
By Muriel Howard, Knyvett had three sons and two daughters:

- Edmund (1508–1551), Sir Edmund (1508–1551), who by 1527 had married Anne Shelton (-1563/4), the daughter of Sir John Shelton of Carrow, Norfolk, and his wife, Anne Boleyn. Knyvet's wife was a sister of Madge and Mary Shelton, and also a first cousin of Anne Boleyn. Sir Edmund Knyvett and Anne Shelton had two sons according to most sources. After Sir Edmund's death, his widow remarried to Christopher Coote, Esq., of Blo’ Norton. Anne's will mentions three children:
  - Edmund Knyvett
  - Henry Knyvett
  - Anthony Knyvett
- Katherine who married firstly Sir William Fermor (d.1558) (Sheriff of Norfolk and Suffolk in 1540 and son of Sir Henry Fermor of East Barsham Manor in Norfolk and Margaret, through whom he was the half-brother of Elizabeth Wood, Lady Boleyn and uncle of John Astley. Her second marriage was to Nicholas Mynne, Esquire, of Walsingham Parva.
- Ferdinand
- Anne was lady-in-waiting to Queen Katherine of Aragon. who married firstly Thomas Thursby of Ashwicken (d. 1543) son of Thomas Thursby (d.1510), merchant, thrice mayor of King’s Lynn and founder of Thoresby College, in 1527; and 2) Henry Spelman (d. 1581), the son of Sir John Spelman (d.1546), and the father of Sir Henry Spelman and of Erasmus Spelman, whose son Henry went to Jamestown in the Colony of Virginia, by license dated 26 January 1543/4.
- Henry (died c. 1547) who married as her second spouse Anne Pickering, the widow of Francis Weston. Anne would thirdly marry John Vaughan, the nephew of Blanche Parry. Their children were:
  - Sir Henry Knyvet (1537–1598) of Charlton Park, Member of Parliament.
    - Katherine Knyvett (1564–1638) who married her third cousin Thomas Howard, 1st Earl of Suffolk and is the ancestor of the Earls of Suffolk and Berkshire.
    - Elizabeth Knyvett (c.1570–1638) who married Thomas Clinton, 3rd Earl of Lincoln.
    - Frances Knyvet (1583–1605), first married Sir William Bevill, and secondly Francis Manners, 6th Earl of Rutland.
    - Anthony Knyvet, illegitimate son, pirate, slave and slave trader.
    - Anne Knyvet, illegitimate daughter, believed to by the same mother as Anthony.
  - Elizabeth Knyvett
  - Alice Knyvett
  - Katherine Knyvett, Lady Paget, (1543 – 20 December 1622), married Henry Paget, 2nd Baron Paget and secondly, Sir Edward Cary of Berkhamsted and Aldenham, Hertfordshire, Master and Treasurer of His Majesty’s Jewels.
  - Thomas Knyvett (1545–1622), English courtier and member of parliament who played a part in foiling the Gunpowder Plot
  - Margaret Knyvett, who married Henry Vavasour of Tadcaster, Copmanthorpe, Yorkshire, and was the mother of Anne Vavasour and Thomas Vavasour

Four months after her husband's death, Muriel Howard died in childbirth between 13 and 21 December 1512. Their five orphaned children were brought up by their paternal grandmother, Eleanor Knyvett.

The actress and theatre director Sally Knyvette, who starred as Jenna Stannis in the British science fiction TV series Blake's 7, is a direct descendant of Sir Thomas Knyvet.

== Death ==
When Henry declared war on France in 1512, Knyvett, along with Sir John Carew, was given command of the royal flagship, the Regent. With a number of court favourites commanding other vessels, a small fleet set sail for the coast of Brittany. On 10 August 1512 they engaged a slightly smaller French fleet, and a violent melee known as the Battle of St. Mathieu ensued off the coast of Brest. Knyvett's ship grappled with the Breton command vessel Marie-la-Cordelière, and was engaged in boarding her when the Marie-la-Cordelière's powder magazine blew up (some say it was deliberately ignited). The two vessels burst into flame. Knyvett and Carew both perished, along with the Breton captain Hervé de Portzmoguer and more than 1,700 men, both French and English.

== In fiction ==
On the TV series The Tudors, a fictionalized Sir Anthony Knivert is based on Knyvett and played by Callum Blue.
