= John Spelman (judge) =

English judge

Sir John Spelman (died 1546) was an English judge from Norfolk, noted for his composition of law reports.

== Origins ==
Born about 1480, Spelman was the fourth son and youngest child of Henry Spelman (died 1496), of Bekerton in Stow Bedon, a lawyer and judge who was a Reader of Gray's Inn and Recorder of Norwich, and his second wife Ela, widow of Thomas Shouldham (died 1472), of Marham, and daughter and coheiress of William Narborough, of Narborough.

Spelman's family originated in Hampshire, where before 1272 they held the manor of Brockenhurst, but by 1369 had moved to Norfolk where they had lands in and later acquired the manor of Bekerton.

== Career ==
About 1500, Spelman followed his father to study law at Gray's Inn, where he served as Reader three times, and in 1521 was created a serjeant, followed next year by gaining his father's old post of Recorder of Norwich. In 1526, he was promoted to King's Serjeant and in 1531 was appointed a Justice of the King's Bench, being sworn in by the Lord Chancellor, Thomas More. Knighted in 1532, he went as a justice of assize on the Northern Circuit, changing to the Home Circuit in 1537. From 1540 he stopped going on circuit and sat at Westminster Hall.

In 1521, Spelman bought from Edmund Knyvett and his wife Anne the portion of the manor of Bydon in Stow Bedon that he did not already own. After the death of his half-brother Thomas Shouldham, he obtained the estate of Narborough and built his family home of Narborough Hall, where his descendants lived until 1773. It contains a stone tablet with his coat of arms that he put up in 1528. In 1537 he was granted the manor of Gracys in Narborough, belonging to the suppressed Pentney Priory.

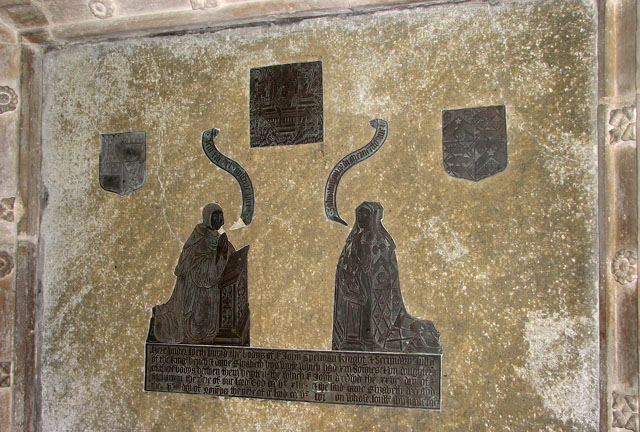
Memorial to Sir John Spelman and his wife in Narborough church

Spelman died in office on 26 January 1546 and was buried at Narborough, where his memorial brass can be seen.

== Law reports ==
Spelman's fame comes from his compilation of law reports, starting with cases he attended in court and lectures and seminars held at Gray's Inn. From 1521, he mainly covered common pleas and, after 1531, King's Bench cases. He also summarised practitioners' discussions on points of law and judges' conferences.

Among significant processes Spelman recorded were the proceedings against Cardinal Wolsey in 1530, the trials of Bishop John Fisher and Thomas More in 1535, the trial and execution of Queen Anne Boleyn in 1536, and Lord Dacre's case in 1541.

== Family ==
Spelman married Elizabeth, daughter and coheiress of Henry Frowick (died 1527), of South Mimms. They had thirteen sons and seven daughters, including:

- John Spelman, eldest son, who married Margaret daughter of Thomas Blenerhassett
- Henry Spelman (died 1581), second son, who married first Anne, the widow of Thomas Thursby, daughter of Thomas Knyvett and his wife Muriel, daughter of Thomas Howard, 2nd Duke of Norfolk. His second wife was Frances (died 1622), daughter of William Saunders, of Ewell, and his first wife Joan Marston.

Spelman's widow Elizabeth married secondly John Coningsby, of North Mimms, son of the judge Humphrey Coningsby, and became the mother of Sir Henry Coningsby. After her second husband's death in 1547, she married William Dodd and died on 5 November 1556, and was buried at North Mimms.
