= Doreward's Hall =

Manor house in Bocking, Essex, England

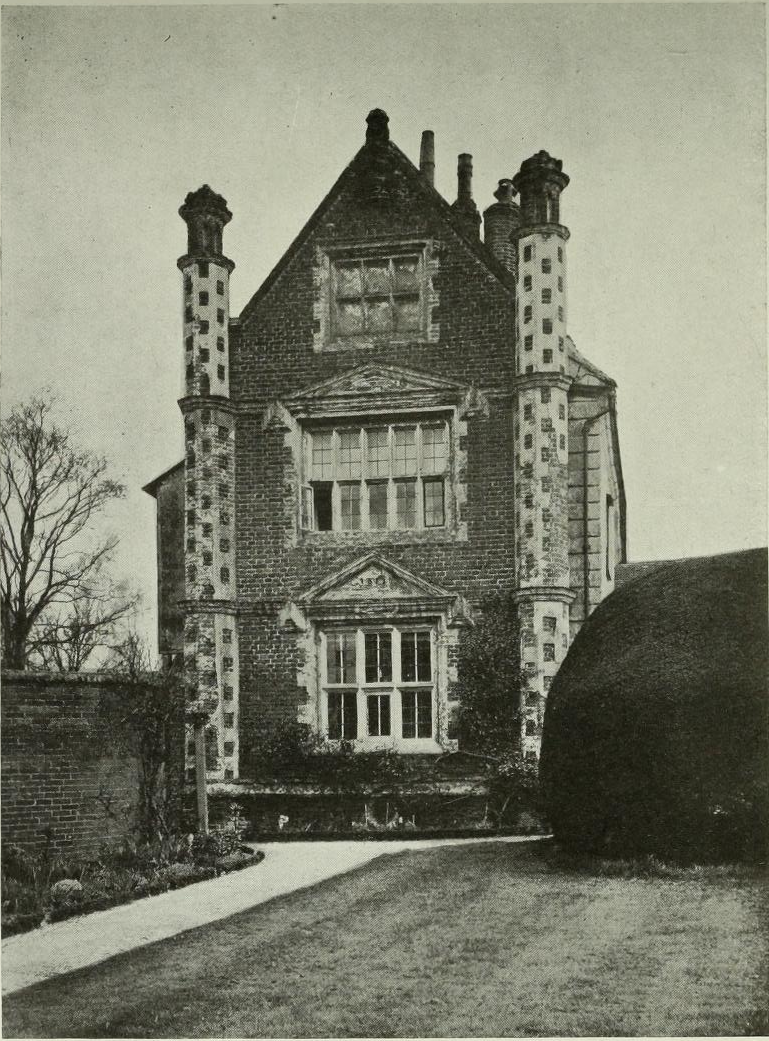
- Doreward's Hall: 1579 or earlier

- Location of Doreward's Hall in Essex
- 51°53′59″N 0°33′38″E
- Type: Farmhouse
- Location: In Bocking, Essex

History
- Built: Rebuilt in 1579, may be older
- Built for: The Dorewards

Listed Building – Grade II*
- Designated: 1951
- Reference no.: 1170740

Doreward's Hall is a partly brick and partly timber-framed and plastered house in Bocking, Essex, England. The house is said to have been rebuilt by Edward Thursby in 1579, but may be of earlier date; the date, 1572, on the southwest end of the West wing is said not to be original. It has been modified a number of times since then. It was designated a Grade II* Listed Building in 1951.

== Description ==
Doreward's Hall, about 700 yards south-southeast of the church, is of two storeys; the walls are partly of brick and partly of plastered timberframing; the roofs are tiled. The house is said to have been rebuilt by Edward Thursby in 1579, but may be of earlier date; the date, 1572, on the southwest end of the West wing is said not to be original; the West wing was probably the North wing of Thursby's house, and is the only part of it which remains. Early in the 17th century an addition was made on the east side, and there are 18th-century or modern additions at the east end and on the north side of the original wing. The plan is now of very irregular form.

The southwest end of the original wing is an interesting example of 16th-century work, and, inside the house, an early 17th-century overmantel is noteworthy.

The southwest end of the original wing is built of brick with plastered dressings, and has, at the angles, octagonal buttresses terminating in pinnacles above the parapet; the storeys are divided by moulded string-courses, and the plinth and coping of the gable are also moulded; on the ground floor is an original square-headed window of three transomed lights, surmounted by a moulded pediment, which has the date 1572 in the plastered tympanum; on the first floor is a similar window of five lights, with a defaced inscription in the tympanum; in the gable is a three-light transomed window with a moulded label; it is now blocked. The original central chimney-stack of the 16th-century wing has three octagonal shafts on a rectangular base with a moulded capping. At the west end of the 17th-century wing is a contemporary chimney-stack with attached shafts, divided by sunk panels.

Interior—Several rooms have stop-chamfered ceiling-beams and exposed joists. On the ground-floor, in the original wing, the southwest room has a wall covered with early 17th-century panelling, and the window has old iron casement-fasteners; some similar panelling has been re-used on the staircase.

In the 18th-century wing, the ceiling-beams are probably re-used material of earlier date, as are two brackets, each carved only on one side. In the 17th-century wing the kitchen has a wide fireplace with a moulded lintel which has carved stops. On the first floor, in the original wing, the northeast room has one wall covered with early 17th-century panelling, and the overmantel of the same date has three arched panels divided by fluted pilasters; the frieze is also panelled, and in the middle panel is an inlaid shield of Thursby of six quarters; one of the doors is original and both the doors have old cock's-head hinges. In the 17th-century wing the room over the kitchen has a wall covered with contemporary panelling, re-used and painted.

In 1916 its condition was good, the plaster defective.

== History ==
The house dates from 1579 or earlier.

The building was designated a Grade II* listed building on 25 October 1951.

Thomas Wright and W. Bartlett wrote in 1831 that:

Dorewards has the mansion pleasantly situated on an acclivity, with a fine open prospect southward: it is a short distance eastward from the church, near the road from High Garret to Braintree, and was new-built by Edward Thorsby, in 1579. This manor was holden of the paramount manor by fealty and rent.

Robert de Bocking held the building in the reign of King John and Henry III: his son, Osbert, was the father of Richard, from whom, in 1316, the estate was conveyed to Ralph, son of Roger Doreward, of Bocking.

Alwine Doreward was the father of Thomas and Roger, who lived in this parish in the time of Henry III (reigned 1216–1272); of these, the latter was the father of Ralph, the purchaser of this estate; his two wives were named Cicely and Agnes: by the first of these he had William and Roger, of whom William was his successor; who, by his wife Joan, only daughter and heiress of John Olivers, of Stanway, had John Doreward; who had, by his wife Katharine, a son and successor of the same name, born in 1390; he had also Joan, married to Richard Waldegrave: Eleanor, wife of Thomas Knyvett (d.1458) of Stanway Essex, Esq., the grandson of Sir John Knyvett, and Elizabeth, married to Chamberlain. Having made great additions to his patrimonial estate, he died in 1420. John Doreward, the son, acquired celebrity in the legal profession; was speaker of the house of commons in 1414, and sheriff of Essex and Hertfordshire in 1425 and 1432. He married Blanche, eldest daughter of Sir William de Coggeshall, by whom he had John, William, Richard, Ralph, and Elizabeth. Upon his death, in 1462, he, by will, divided his extensive possessions among his children. John, the eldest son, married Anne, daughter and co-heiress of Thomas Urswick, Esq. by whom he had John, who succeeded his father on his death in 1476, and who, dying in 1480, without issue, was succeeded by his uncle, William Doreward, Esq. who married Margery, eldest daughter and co-heiress of Roger Arsick, of South-acre, in Norfolk, by whom he left his son and heir, John; and Elizabeth, married to Thomas Fotheringay, Esq. of Woodrising, in Norfolk; the son resided at Spain's Hall, in Great Yeldham, where, having married Margery, daughter of John Nanton, Esq. he died in 1495, leaving no issue; the three daughters of his sister Elizabeth being his co-heiresses: these were Margaret, wife of Nicholas Beaupre, of Norfolk; Ellen, of Henry Thorsby, Esq.; and Christian, married to John de Vere, afterwards the fifteenth earl of Oxford. On the termination of the line of Doreward, their extensive possessions, consisting of above twenty lordships and capital estates in this county, with others in various parts of the country, were partitioned out to the co-heiresses, and conveyed to the families of Beaupre, Thorsby, and Vere; but, soon after the decease of Margaret Beaupre, in 1513, her share came into the family of her sister, Ellen Thorsby, and was the property of Thomas Thorsby, Esq. the eldest son of Henry, who had these possessions at the time of his decease in 1532.

Ankfrith, a Danish nobleman, and the ancestor of the Thorsby family, flourished about the year 1014, in the time of King Sweyn, and had vast possessions in the northern parts of the kingdom. They derive their surname from a manor or village in the north riding of Yorkshire. Of this family, Edward Thorsby, Esq. was the first who resided at Dorewards Hall, which he possessed at the time of his decease, in 1602, with a park and several parcels of land. He was survived by his wife Mary, daughter of Philip Bedingfield, Esq. Christopher, John and Edward, twins, and six daughters. The eldest son, Christopher, succeeded his father, and married Audrey, daughter of Sir Nicholas Timperley, Esq. of Hintlesham, in Suffolk; he had by her William, Henry, John, Edward, and three daughters; and, on his decease in 1626, was succeeded by William, his eldest son, who married Elizabeth, daughter of William Perte, of Middlesex, by whom he had Christopher, William, Edward, Tindal, John; Elizabeth, Anne, Penelope, Mary, and Sarah. Mary was married to Rice Gwyn, Serjeant-at-law; Philippa, to John St. John, Esq. of Hatfield Peverel; Elizabeth, to Edward Dennys, Esq.; Katharine, to John Smith, clerk; and Sarah died unmarried. Christopher Thorsby, the eldest son, had four wives, of whom the first was Jane, daughter of Thomas Smyth Neville, Esq. of Holt, in Leicestershire, by whom he had his only son Thomas. His second wife was of a family of the name of Dove; but his two other wives are not mentioned by name. In 1637, he sold this and the manors of Bradfords and Harries to Richard Eden, LL.D. whose son or grandson sold them to John le Motte Honeywood, Esq. of Markshall, whose descendants have retained possession to the present time.

=== Arms ===
- Arms of Doreward: Ermine, a chevron charged with three crescents
- Arms of Thorsby – Argent, a chevron between three lioncels rampant, sable

== Owners ==
Robert Thursby (d.1499) of Ashwicken and Burg's Hall, Burgess for Lynn. He was the brother of Thomas Thursby (d.1510), merchant, thrice Mayor of King's Lynn and the founder and benefactor of Thoresby College, and the son of Henry Thoresby, four times Mayor of Lynn and Burgess for Lynn 1444–5, 1450, and 1455.

His son, Henry Thursbye of Ashwicken and Burg's Hall in Hillington (1476 – 20 September 1506), married Helen or Ellen (b.1477), daughter and co-heiress of Thomas Fedringhey (son of Gerrard Fotheringhay) by his wife Elizabeth Doreward, sister and heiress of John Doreward and daughter of William Doreward of Bocking in Essex by his wife Blanche Coggeshall, daughter and heiress of Sir William Coggeshall, by his wife Mary Harsicke, daughter and co-heiress of Sir Roger Harsicke. Helen or Ellen Fotheringhay was the co-heiress of her maternal uncle John Doreward (d.1495), together with her sisters, Margaret Fotheringhay (b.1476) who married Nicholas Beaupré, and Christiana or Christian Fotheringhay (b.1481), wife of John de Vere, 15th Earl of Oxford (1482–1540), Knight and Lord Great Chamberlain.

Henry Thursby and Helen Fotheringhay had:

1. Thomas Thursbye (1498–1532) of Bocking. Married Elizabeth or Isabel Burgoyne (d.1532+), the daughter of John Burgoyne and Margaret
  - Thomas Thoresby (d.1541), who married either the daughter of Staveley or the daughter Calibutt of Castle Acre in Norfolk, or both
    - Edward Thursbye of Bockinge (b.bef.1541 – 1579+) in Essex, gentleman, son and heir, m. Mary, daughter of Philip Beddingfield of Norfolk, Esquire. At the death of his father, his wardship and marriage was given to his relative Edmund Beaupré. Edward Thursby's wife Mary Bedingfield was the sister of Edmund Beaupre's second wife Katherine Bedingfield (widow of John Wynter of Great Yarmouth). They were both the daughters of Phillip Bedingfeld of Ditchingham Hall in Norfolk. Edward Thursby and Mary Bedingfield had:
      1. Christopher Thoresby, Esq., or Thursby, as the name begun now to be written, espoused Ethelred, daughter of Nicholas Timperley, Esq. of Hincklesham in Suffolk, and had a son and successor:
        - William Thursby, Esq., of Witham, in the county of Essex. This gentleman sold Dorewards. He wedded Elizabeth, daughter of William Pert, Esq., by whom (who d. in 1666,) he left at his decease in 1636, a son and successor:
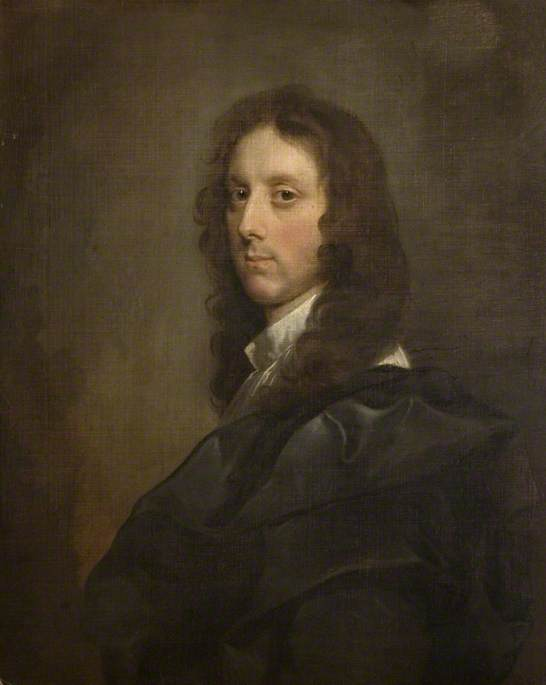
          - Christopher Thursby of Castor, Northamptonshire (1608–1690), attributed to Gilbert Soest (c.1605–1681)
            Christopher Thursby of Castor, Northamptonshire, the father of:
            - William Thursby of Abington, Member of Parliament. "Two years after William’s birth his mother died and his father soon remarried. Thereafter he was brought up by his mother’s relations, the Nevills, at Holt in Leicestershire. For the rest of his life, as he stated in his will, he had ‘little or no correspondence’ with his father’s Essex relatives."
      2. Edward, ancestor of the Thursbys of Braintree and of Ravenshall, Essex;
      3. John, d.s.p.;
      4. Anne, m. to William Jenney, Esq. of Cressingham, Norfolk;
      5. Philippa, m. to John St. John, Esq., of Hatfield Peverel, Essex;
      6. Catherine, m. to the Rev. John Smith, of Southacre;
      7. Mary, m. to Mr. Serjeant (Richard) Gwynne;
      8. Elizabeth, m. to Edward Dennis, Esq.
2. Henry Thursby, to whom his father devised the manor of Burg's Hall in Hillington.

== Current usage ==
It is today a farmhouse divided into two homes, with farm buildings and 210 acres of farmland.

== See also ==
- Grade II* listed buildings in Braintree, Essex
