= Beaupré Bell =

English antiquary

- Born: 1704
- Died: 1741 (aged 36–37)

Beaupré Bell Esq. (1704–1741) was an English antiquary, of Beaupré Hall, Norfolk.

Beaupré Bell was the first son of Beaupré Bell Esq., and Margaret, the daughter of Sir Anthony Oldfield, and was a fifth generation descendant of Sir Robert Bell and his wife Dorthie, of the old family of Beaupré or De Bello Prato.

His father Beaupré Bell was eccentric and "hardly allowed his son the common necessaries of life", but owned an estate worth £1500 per annum and also was reported to have had over 500 horses, all unbroken and allowed to roam wild. He possessed a good library, though neglected with the rest of the mansion.

Beaupré Bell attended Westminster College and moved on to Trinity College, Cambridge, where he finished his education.

He had an eye for all things ancient, with a particular interest in Roman coins. Bell authored several works on this subject, one on the coins minted by Roman Emperors.

He became Vice-President of the Spalding Gentlemen's Society in 1726, and gave assistance to Francis Blomefield.

Beaupré Bell died from consumption on his way to Bath. By his will he bequeathed his collection of coins and medals to Trinity College, Cambridge, together with 12 volumes of manuscripts that were catalogued, together with the medieval manuscripts, by Montague Rhodes James.
