= Roger de Kirton =

Arms of Meres: Gules, a fess between three water bougets ermine

Roger de Kirton (died 7 December 1383) (alias de Kirketon / Roger de Meres / Meeres) of Kirton Meres in Lincolnshire, was a King's Sergeant 1367, and a Justice of the Common Pleas (27 November 1371 – 1380). Arms: Gules, a fess between three water bougets ermine, as shown in a stained glass window (c.1570) formerly at Beaupré Hall in Norfolk, now in the Victoria and Albert Museum.
