= John Jeffrey (judge) =

16th-century English politician

John Jeffrey [aka John Jefferay] (ca. 1524 – 13 May 1578), of Chiddingly, Sussex, was an English politician.

He was a Member (MP) of the Parliament of England for Clitheroe in 1563, East Grinstead in 1571 and Sussex in 1572.

== Life ==
He was son of Richard Jeffrey of Chiddingly Manor, by Eliza, daughter of Robert Whitfield of Wadhurst. He was admitted a member of Gray's Inn in 1544, called to the bar in 1546, and was Lent reader there in 1561.

In Easter term 1567 Jeffrey became a serjeant-at-law, and on 15 October 1572 a queen's serjeant. On 15 May 1576 he was appointed a judge of the queen's bench, and was promoted on 12 October 1577 to succeed Sir Robert Bell as chief baron of the exchequer. In the autumn of 1578 he died at Coleman Street Ward, London, and was buried under a magnificent tomb in Chiddingly Church.

== Family ==
Jeffrey was twice married, first to Alice, daughter and heiress of John Apsley, by whom he had one daughter, Elizabeth, who married Edward Montagu, 1st Baron Montagu of Boughton; and secondly to Mary, daughter of George Goring.

Parliament of England
Preceded by John Pelham; Thomas Palmer	Member of Parliament for Sussex; 1572–1578; With: Thomas Shirley	Succeeded by Walter Covert; Sir Thomas Shirley
