= William Coningsby =

16th-century English politician

Sir William Coningsby (c. 1483 – September 1540) was an English Member of Parliament and a Justice of the King's Bench.

== Biography ==
William Coningsby was born by 1483, the son of Sir Humphrey Coningsby of Aldenham, Hertfordshire. (Note: William Coningsby is said to have been descended from Roger de Coningsby, lord of Coningsby in Lincolnshire in the reign of John.) He was educated at Eton, and King's College, Cambridge, becoming a Fellow of that college. He was Lent Reader at the Inner Temple in 1519, Treasurer of the same Inn, 1525–6, Reader again in 1526 and one of the Governors of the Inner Temple in 1533–4, and 1538–9. He was one of the Commissioners appointed to hear causes in Chancery in relief of Cardinal Wolsey, in 1529.

Coningsby was Recorder of Lynn from 1524 until his death in September 1540 and appointed a serjeant-at-law and Justice of the King's Bench in 1540. In 1536, he was elected to represent King's Lynn in Parliament.

Coningsby was one of the governors of the Inner Temple in 1533–40, 1536–7, and 1538–9. In 1539-40, he was arraigned in the Starchamber and sent to the Tower for advising Sir John Shelton to make a will upon a secret trust, in contravention of the Statute of Uses (27 Hen. 8. c. 10). He was released after ten days’ confinement, but lost the offices of prothonotary of the king's bench and attorney of the duels of Lancaster, which he then held. On 5 July of the same year, he was appointed to a puisne judgeship in the king's bench, and was knighted; but as his name is not included in the writ of summons to parliament in the next year, it would seem that he died or retired soon after his appointment. Coningsby was also recorder of Lynn in Norfolk, in which county his seat, Eaton Hell, near Wallington, was situate.

== Family ==
Coningsby had married Beatrice, the daughter of Thomas Thoresby of Lynn and the widow of William Trew. They had a son, Christopher and four daughters. His daughter Margaret (c. 1522–1598) married Sir Robert Alington, the son of Sir Giles Alington, of Horseheath, High Sheriff of Cambridgeshire. She married secondly Thomas Pledger in Bottisham in that county.

His son Christopher Coningsby (1516– 15 September 1547) of Wallington, Esq. was slain in the first of Edward VI at the battle of Muscleborough in Scotland. His wife was Anne, daughter of Sir Roger Woodhouse of Kimberley. After her husband's death, Anne remarried to Sir Thomas Ragland. By his wife, Christopher Coningsby had three daughters and coheiresses. Elizabeth married Francis Gawdy, Esq., Anne married Alexander Balam of Elme in Cambridgeshire, and Amy married Thomas Clarke of Avington in Northamptonshire.
