= Leziate =

Village in Norfolk, England

Coordinates: 52.739291°N 0.479997°E

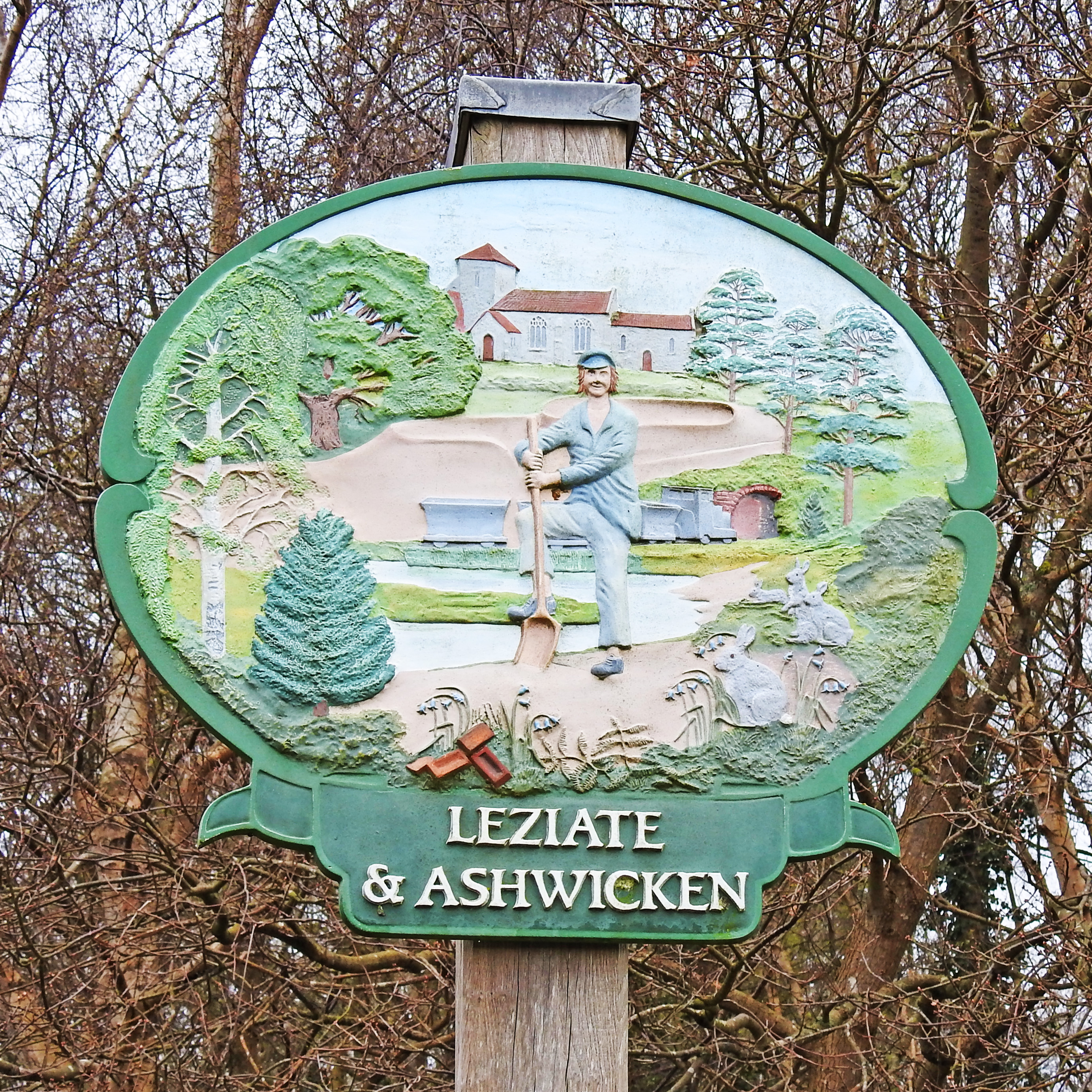
- Leziate & Ashwicken Village Sign

- Location within Norfolk
- Area: 4.39 sq mi (11.4 km^{2})
- Population: 592 (2021 census)
  - Density: 135/sq mi (52/km^{2})
- OS grid reference: TF6719
  - London: 106 miles (171 km)
- Civil parish: Leziate
- District: King's Lynn and West Norfolk
- Shire county: Norfolk
- Region: East
- Country: England
- Sovereign state: United Kingdom
- Post town: KING'S LYNN
- Postcode district: PE32
- Dialling code: 01553
- Police: Norfolk
- Fire: Norfolk
- Ambulance: East of England
- UK Parliament: North West Norfolk

Leziate is a hamlet and civil parish in the English county of Norfolk. The civil parish also includes the smaller village of Ashwicken.

Leziate is located 5.7 miles (9.2 km) east of King's Lynn and 44 miles (71 km) west of Norwich.

== Correct pronunciation ==
"Ledjet"

== History ==
Ingoldisthorpe's name is of Anglo-Saxon origin and derives from the Old English for pasture gate.

In the Domesday Book, Leziate is recorded as a settlement of 3 households in the hundred of Freebridge. In 1086, the village was part of the East Anglian estates of Robert Malet.

After the parish was united with Ashwicken in the late 15th century, Thomas Thursby, the Lord of the Manor, was accused of appropriating most of the common land for himself, by enclosing it, and of evicting tenants from their homes before demolishing them. In 1602 Mr Bramwell, the parson, had removed the lead from the roof of the chancel of the church without authority, causing it to become ruined, but services were still held in the rest of the building until the late 1700s, by which time it was decrepit. It was demolished soon after 1816, so there are now no remains above ground, and the site is a scheduled monument. The remains of the parish church of Bawsey, dedicated to St Michael, are also within the parish, further to the west. This is a grade II* listed site, as much of the 12th century structure remains intact, although the font is now in the garden of Whitehouse Farmhouse.

Between 1846 and 1968, the village was served by Middleton Towers railway station. This was on the Lynn and Dereham Railway, which ran between King's Lynn and Dereham. When the railway opened, the station was known at Middleton, but it was renamed as Middleton Towers on 1 November 1924. Following the publication of Dr Richard Beeching's report in 1963, closure of Norfolk's railways began in earnest, with Middleton Towers becoming an unstaffed halt in 1966, and the final passenger trains running on 7 September 1968. The station building is actually in the adjacent parish of Middleton, although the railway to the east and west of the platforms lies in Leziate.

Soon after the opening of the line, extraction of high grade silica sand began from pits to the north of the railway. It was used for the manufacture of glass. A siding was constructed to the west of the level crossing in 1881, allowing a Mr Bagge to trade in sand and coal. Sand from the pit at Old Carr, around 0.25 miles (0.40 km) to the north, was conveyed to the railway by a separate mineral railway, probably of 2 ft (610 mm) gauge. The operation had ceased by the early 1900s, and Old Carr was used for forestry. However, a new siding to the east of the station was approved on 1 March 1904, for the use of J Boam & Sons, again for sand traffic. Sand was being extracted from an area of 520 acres (210 ha), and a large industrial plant developed to the north of the station, with standard gauge railway sidings and narrow gauge tramways used to transport the sand to the works. A 20-ton weighbridge was installed in 1907, and the railway minutes quote 3,000 wagons of sand per year, but are unclear as to whether this was the projected or actual traffic. After closure of the line to Dereham, the section between Middleton Towers and King's Lynn remained open for the sand traffic and a new run-round loop was constructed to the east of the station buildings. British Industrial Sand took over Boam's siding on 23 March 1981, and shortly afterwards, the railway sidings and tramway were replaced by conveyors. Some of the tramway track had previously been acquired by the East Anglia Transport Museum, and was reused to construct their East Suffolk Light Railway.

The extraction of silica sand has continued, although by 2015 the operation was owned by Sibelco. Around 800,000 tonnes of sand are extracted each year, of which three-quarters is transported away by rail. Trains normally consist of over 30 wagons, into which 1,000 tonnes of sand are loaded from a gantry which straddles the track. Two trains each day take sand to three glass factories, at Barnsley, Doncaster and Goole, although more trains are run when hot weather or major sporting events increase the volume of glass needed.

== Geography ==
According to the 2021 census, Leziate has a population of 616 people which shows an increase from the 592 people listed in the 2011 census.

== The deserted village of Holt ==
During the medieval period there was another settlement within the parish. It was called Holt. The village was demolished when the landlord, the notorious Thomas Thursby, enclosed the land and converted it to pasture for his sheep. Holt was the only Norfolk village recorded in the Commission of Inquiry in 1517 as being totally depopulated in this way.

== Governance ==
Leziate is part of the electoral ward of Gayton & Grimston for local elections and is part of the district of King's Lynn and West Norfolk.

The hamlet's national constituency is North West Norfolk which has been represented by the Conservative's James Wild MP since 2010.
