= Edmund Knyvet =

MP-Eng and Sheriff of Norfolk & Suffolk

Sir Edmund Knyvet
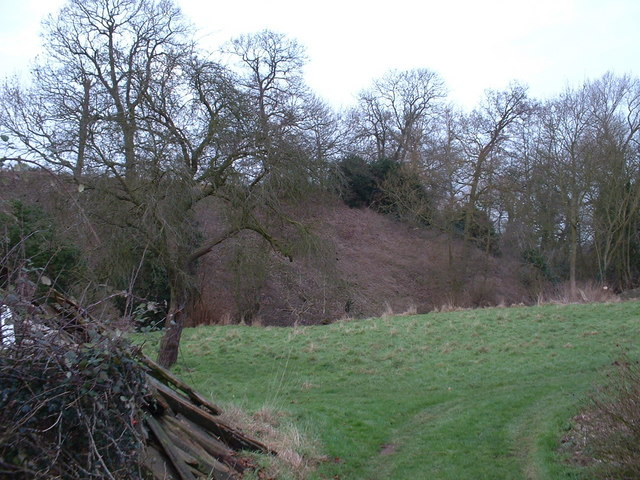
- Remains of Buckenham Castle, seat of the Knyvet family
- Born: c. 1508
- Died: 1 May 1551; London
- Spouse: Anne Shelton
- Issue: Thomas Knyvet another son
- Father: Thomas Knyvett
- Mother: Muriel Howard

Sir Edmund Knyvet (c. 1508 – 1 May 1551) was the eldest son of Thomas Knyvett (c. 1485 – 1512), a distinguished courtier and sea captain, and Muriel Howard (died 1512), the daughter of Thomas Howard, 2nd Duke of Norfolk.

== Family ==
=== Early life ===
Born about 1508, Edmund Knyvet was the eldest son of Thomas Knyvett (c. 1485 – 1512) and Muriel Howard (died 1512), the daughter of Thomas Howard, 2nd Duke of Norfolk, by his first wife, Elizabeth Tilney. By her first marriage to John Grey, 2nd Viscount Lisle, Muriel Howard had a daughter, Elizabeth Grey, Viscountess Lisle. His full siblings were Ferdinand, Henry (died c. 1546), Katherine, and Anne. Knyvet's father was slain in a naval battle near Brest on 10 August 1512, and four months later, Knyvet's mother died in childbirth in December 1512.

=== Minority ===
Knyvet and his siblings were at first entrusted to the care of their paternal grandmother, Eleanor Knyvet. In 1516, Knyvet's wardship was sold for £400 to his father's friend, Charles Brandon, 1st Duke of Suffolk, who had earlier been betrothed to Knyvet's half-sister, Elizabeth Grey. It appears that Suffolk resold the wardship to Thomas Wyndham of Felbrigg, another friend and colleague of Knyvet's father. Wyndham died in 1522 and directed his executors to sell the wardship to Anthony Wingfield.

=== Majority and Inheritance ===
Although Knyvet reached the age of majority in about 1529, he did not come into his entire inheritance at that time. Knyvet's great-grandfather, William Knyvet (died 1515), had married, as his second wife Joan Stafford, daughter of Humphrey Stafford, 1st Duke of Buckingham, and had partly disinherited Edmund Knyvet (died 1504), his eldest son by his first marriage, by leaving Buckenham Castle and other properties to Edward Knyvet (died 1528), the eldest son of his second marriage. Edward Knyvet died childless in 1528, and William Knyvet's lands then reverted to William Knyvet's heir, Edmund Knyvet, who had livery of his lands in 1533.

=== Marriage and Children ===
By 1527 Knyvet had married Anne Shelton, the daughter of John Shelton of Carrow, Norfolk, and his wife, Anne Boleyn. Knyvet's wife was a sister of Mary Shelton, and a first cousin of Queen Anne Boleyn. Sir Edmund Knyvet and Anne Shelton had two sons, the elder of whom, Sir Thomas Knyvett (c. 1528 – 22 September 1569), married Catherine Stanley, daughter of Edward Stanley, 3rd Earl of Derby, and Margaret Barlow.

=== Family Connections ===
Through his marriage, Knyvet was closely connected to the Shelton, Boleyn, and Howard families. Knyvet joined his uncle, Thomas Howard, 3rd Duke of Norfolk, in suppressing the uprising in Yorkshire in 1536 known as the Pilgrimage of Grace.

It has been suggested that Knyvet was the "E.K." who contributed verses to an anthology compiled by his sister-in-law, Mary Shelton.

Knyvet has sometimes been confused with his uncle and namesake, Edmund Knyvet, serjeant porter to King Henry VIII, who died 1 May 1539.

== Career ==
Knyvet was knighted in 1538 or 1539 and was made sheriff of Norfolk and Suffolk in November 1539. At times Knyvet's relationship with the Duke of Norfolk was strained. According to Roger Virgoe, Norfolk "always wrote about Knyvet in terms which revealed small sympathy for his hotheaded, conceited and clever young kinsman". In 1539, Knyvet's hotheadedness led to an altercation over the election of Edmund Wyndham and Richard Southwell as knights of the shire (MP) for Norfolk, as a result of which the Duke bound both Knyvet and Southwell for £2000 to keep the peace and appear in the Star Chamber. In April 1541, Knyvet struck Thomas Clere, a servant of the Duke's son and heir, Henry Howard, Earl of Surrey, in the King's tennis court. In accordance with a recent statute enacted to curb violence at court, Knyvet was sentenced to have his right hand struck off, a sentence he only narrowly escaped by a last-minute royal pardon. In February 1542, Knyvet was also bound for 500 marks to attend daily before the Privy Council, although for what reason is unknown. Knyvet contributed to the downfall of the Howards in 1546 and testified against Surrey at his treason trial that December. He was rewarded with a lease of the manor of Wymondham and other Howard lands. He took his place on the bench as Justice of the Peace for Norfolk from 1543 to his death.

The fall of the Howards paved the way for Knyvet's election as a knight of the shire for Norfolk in 1547. However, according to Virgoe, he remained "a thorn in the flesh of authority", being bound for £1000 in February 1548 to attend before the Protector Somerset and the Privy Council to answer charges which may have been related to his alleged adultery with the Countess of Sussex.

During Kett's Rebellion in the summer of 1549, Knyvet "led his servants in a spirited attack against the Norfolk rebels", was one of those sent to parley with Kett, and served under John Dudley, Earl of Warwick in the final battle at Mousehold Heath on 27 August 1549. Two years later, Knyvet died in London on 1 May 1551.
