= Reader (Inns of Court) =

A reader in one of the Inns of Court in London was originally a senior barrister of the Inn who was elected to deliver a lecture or series of lectures on a particular legal topic. Two readers (known as Lent and Autumn Readers) would be elected annually to serve a one-year term.

Lincoln's Inn became formally organised as a place of legal education thanks to a decree in 1464, which required a reader to give lectures to the law students there.

By 1569, at Gray's Inn, there had been readers for more than a century. Before the rise of the benchers, they formed the governing body of the inn.
