= Ashwicken =

Village in Norfolk, England

Coordinates: 52.74°N 00.51°E

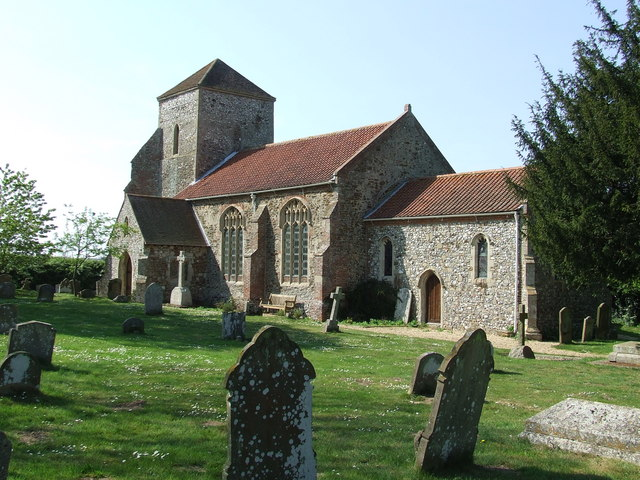
- All Saints’ parish church, Ashwicken, Norfolk

- Location within Norfolk
- OS grid reference: TF7019
- Civil parish: Leziate
- District: King's Lynn and West Norfolk
- Shire county: Norfolk
- Region: East
- Country: England
- Sovereign state: United Kingdom
- Post town: King's Lynn
- Postcode district: PE32

Ashwicken is a small village and former civil parish, now in the parish of Leziate, in the King's Lynn and West Norfolk district, in the county of Norfolk, England. The village sits on the B1145 King's Lynn to Mundesley road around 5 miles (8.0 km) east of King's Lynn. In 1931 the parish had a population of 117. On 1 April 1935 the parish was abolished and merged with Leziate.

Ashwicken is the site of a shrunken medieval village, one of around 200 lost settlements in Norfolk. The remains of the village were visible as earthworks near to Ashwicken Hall but were partly destroyed by ploughing in the 1990s. The hall was surrounded by a medieval moat which was filled in during the 19th century.

The parish church, which is dedicated to All Saints, dates from the medieval period. It was restored during the 19th century and is a Grade II* listed building.
