= Thoresby College =

Building in King's Lynn, Norfolk, England

Coordinates: 52.752°N 0.394°E

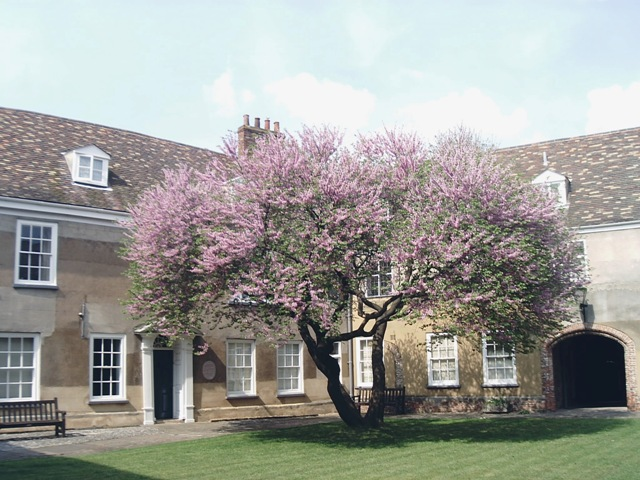
The courtyard of Thoresby College on Queen Street in King's Lynn.

Thoresby College (also Trinity College) was a 16th-century collegiate-style residence for thirteen chantry priests in King's Lynn, Norfolk, East of England. Located on Queen Street opposite the Guildhall, it has been converted into a youth hostel, and offices for the King`s Lynn Preservation Trust. It is a Grade I listed building.

The priests were employed by the Trinity Guild of King's Lynn. Its founder and benefactor, Thomas Thoresby, was a merchant and three times Mayor of the town; he died in 1510 before the building was completed. Notable features include a Dutch gable front, the interior has exposed wood beams. The original great door was decorated with parchemin panels.
