= 3rd Earl of Sussex =

3rd Earl of Sussex may refer to:

- Thomas Radclyffe, 3rd Earl of Sussex (1525–1583)
- Henry Yelverton, 3rd Earl of Sussex (1728–1799), heir of Talbot Yelverton, 1st Earl of Sussex

== See also ==
- Earl of Sussex
