= Talbot Yelverton, 1st Earl of Sussex =

English peer

Talbot Yelverton, 1st Earl of Sussex PC KB FRS (2 May 1690 – 27 October 1731) was an English peer and member of the House of Lords, styled Hon. Talbot Yelverton until 1704, and known as Talbot Yelverton, 2nd Viscount Longueville from 1704 to 1717, when he was created Earl of Sussex.

== Life ==
He was born the son of Henry Yelverton, 1st Viscount Longueville, and his wife, Barbara, daughter of Sir John Talbot of Lacock, Wiltshire and educated at Christ Church, Oxford.

From 1722 to 1727, he was a Gentleman of the Bedchamber to George I, Appointed Deputy Earl Marshal in 1725, he presided over the ceremonies at the coronation of the latter monarch. He was one of the founder Knights Companion of the Order of the Bath in 1725 and was sworn of the Privy Council upon the accession of George II in 1727.

He died in Bath, Somerset on 27 October 1731 and was buried at Easton Maudit, Northamptonshire. Before 1726, he had married Lucy Pelham, daughter of Henry Pelham, by whom he had two sons:

- George Augustus Yelverton, 2nd Earl of Sussex (1727–1758)
- Henry Yelverton, 3rd Earl of Sussex (1728–1799)

His elder son George succeeded him.

Political offices
Preceded by The Earl of Berkshire	Deputy Earl Marshal; 1725–1731	Succeeded by The Earl of Effingham
Peerage of Great Britain
New creation	Earl of Sussex; 1717–1731	Succeeded by George Yelverton
Peerage of England
Preceded by Henry Yelverton	Viscount Longueville; 1704–1731	Succeeded by George Yelverton
