= List of knights companion of the Order of the Bath =

This is a list of those men who were made knights companion of the Order of the Bath from the date of the Order's revival by King George I of Great Britain, 18 May 1725, to its reorganisation on 2 January 1815. During this period the Order was limited to the sovereign (the king), the great master and thirty-six knights companions. Knights companion bore the post-nominal KB. Those knights living at the time of the remodelling of the order automatically became knights grand cross, with the post-nominal GCB.

== Founder knights ==
All the founder knights were invested on 27 May 1725 (except Lords Inchiquin and Tyrconnell, who were invested on 28 May, and the Duke of Richmond, who was not invested at all) and then installed on 17 June 1725.

Image	Name	Notes
	Prince William Augustus	died 31 October 1765
	John Montagu, 2nd Duke of Montagu	died 5 July 1749
	William Montagu, 2nd Duke of Manchester	died 21 October 1739
	Charles Beauclerk, Earl of Burford	died 27 July 1751
	John Sidney, 6th Earl of Leicester	died 27 September 1737
	Willem van Keppel, 2nd Earl of Albemarle	died 22 December 1754
	Henry Scott, 1st Earl of Deloraine	died 25 December 1750
	George Montagu, 1st Earl of Halifax	died 9 May 1739
	Talbot Yelverton, 1st Earl of Sussex	died 27 October 1731
	Thomas Fermor, 1st Earl of Pomfret	died 8 July 1753
	Lord Nassau Powlett	died 24 August 1741
	Admiral George Byng, 1st Viscount Torrington	died 17 January 1733
	George Cholmondeley, Viscount Malpas	died 10 June 1770
	John Campbell, Viscount Glenorchy	died 26 January 1782
	John West, 7th Baron De La Warr	died 16 March 1766
	Hugh Fortescue, 14th Baron Clinton	died 2 May 1751
	Robert Walpole, 1st Baron Walpole	died 31 March 1751
	Spencer Compton	resigned on receiving the Garter 12 June 1733
	William Stanhope	died May 1772
	Conyers Darcy	died 1 December 1758
	Thomas Lumley-Saunderson	died 15 March 1752
	Paul Methuen	died 11 April 1757
	Robert Walpole	resigned on receiving the Garter 26 May 1726
	Robert Sutton	died 13 August 1746
	Lieutenant General Charles Wills	died 25 December 1741
	Sir John Hobart, 5th Baronet	died 22 September 1756
	Sir William Gage, 7th Baronet	died 23 April 1744
	Robert Clifton	died 7 December 1762
	Michael Newton	died 6 April 1743
	William Yonge	died 10 August 1755
	Thomas Watson-Wentworth	died 14 December 1750
	John Monson	died 18 July 1748
	William Morgan	died 24 April 1731
	Thomas Coke	died 20 April 1759
	William O'Brien, 4th Earl of Inchiquin	died 18 July 1777
	John Brownlow, 1st Viscount Tyrconnel	died 27 February 1754

== Subsequent appointments ==
Date	Image	Name	Notes
12 January 1732		Henry Brydges, Marquess of Carnarvon	died 28 November 1771
12 January 1732		William Bateman, 1st Viscount Bateman	died December 1744
12 January 1732		Sir George Downing, 3rd Baronet	died 10 June 1749
17 January 1732		Charles Gunter Nicoll	died 24 November 1733
26 June 1742		Thomas Robinson	died 20 September 1770
12 July 1743		Lieutenant-General Philip Honywood	died 1752
12 July 1743		Lieutenant-General James Campbell	died 1745
12 July 1743		Lieutenant-General John Cope	died 1760
12 July 1743		Field Marshal Sir John Ligonier	died 28 April 1770
28 May 1744		Richard FitzWilliam, 6th Viscount FitzWilliam	died 25 April 1776
28 May 1744		Sir Charles Hanbury Williams	died 2 November 1759
28 May 1744		Henry Calthorpe	
28 May 1744		Thomas Whitmore	
28 May 1744		Sir William Harbord, 1st Baronet	died 17 February 1770
29 May 1747		Rear-Admiral Sir Peter Warren	died 29 July 1752
14 November 1747		Vice-Admiral Edward Hawke	died 17 October 1781
2 May 1749		Lieutenant-General Charles Howard	died 26 August 1765
2 May 1749		General Sir John Mordaunt	died 23 October 1780
2 May 1749		Major-General Charles Armand Powlett	died 14 November 1751
2 May 1749		John Savile	died 17 February 1778
12 March 1752		Richard Onslow, 3rd Baron Onslow	died 8 October 1776
27 August 1753		Edward Walpole	died 1784
27 August 1753		Lieutenant-General Charles Powlett	died 5 July 1765
27 August 1753		Edward Hussey-Montagu	died 25 November 1802
27 August 1753		Lieutenant-General Richard Lyttelton	died 1 October 1770
12 December 1753		Admiral of the Fleet Sir William Rowley	died 1768
23 September 1754		Benjamin Keene	died 1757
27 November 1756		Lieutenant-General William Blakeney	died 20 September 1761
23 March 1761		John Proby, 1st Baron Carysfort	died 18 October 1772
23 March 1761		Lieutenant-General Joseph Yorke	died 2 December 1792
23 March 1761		Sir James Gray, 2nd Baronet	died 9 January 1773
23 March 1761		Sir William Beauchamp-Proctor, 1st Baronet	died 13 September 1773
23 March 1761		Sir John Gibbons, 2nd Baronet	died 9 July 1776
23 March 1761		Admiral George Pocock	died 1792
23 March 1761		Major-General Sir Jeffery Amherst	died 3 August 1797
23 March 1761		Major-General John Griffin Griffin	died 25 May 1797
23 March 1761		Francis Blake Delaval	died 1771
23 March 1761		Charles Frederick	died 18 December 1785
26 March 1761		George Warren	died 31 August 1801
16 May 1761		Vice-Admiral Charles Saunders	died 7 December 1775
16 January 1764		Charles Coote	died 20 October 1800
24 April 1764		Major-General Robert Clive, 1st Baron Clive	died 22 November 1774
13 December 1765		Andrew Mitchell	died 28 January 1771
27 December 1765		Lieutenant-General William Draper	died 1787
30 December 1767		Prince Frederick, Bishop of Osnabrück	made GCB 2 January 1815
25 October 1768		Sir Horace Mann, 1st Baronet	died 6 November 1786
18 May 1770		Robert Knight, 1st Earl of Catherlough	died 30 March 1772
18 May 1770		Vice-Admiral Sir John Moore, 1st Baronet	died 2 February 1779
28 June 1770		Rear-Admiral Sir John Lindsay	died 1778
28 June 1770		Major-General Eyre Coote	died 28 April 1783
18 February 1771		Lieutenant-General Sir Charles Montagu	died 1777
18 February 1771		Ralph Payne	died 1 August 1807
18 February 1771		William Lynch	died 25 August 1785
15 January 1772		Major-General Sir Charles Hotham, 8th Baronet	died 25 January 1794
15 January 1772		William Hamilton	died 6 April 1803
29 February 1772		Lieutenant-Colonel Robert Murray Keith	died 1795
29 May 1772		George Macartney	died 31 May 1806
22 February 1773		Lieutenant-General James Adolphus Oughton	died 2 May 1780
2 June 1773		Robert Gunning	made GCB (civil) 2 January 1815
3 August 1774		Lieutenant-General Sir George Howard	died 16 July 1796
3 August 1774		Lieutenant-Colonel John de Blaquiere	died 27 August 1812
3 February 1775		William Gordon	died 26 January 1798
15 December 1775		Lieutenant-General John Irwin	died May 1788
6 July 1776		General Guy Carleton	died 10 November 1808
13 October 1776		Major-General William Howe	died 12 July 1814
9 November 1776		Lieutenant-General John Clavering	died 1778
11 April 1777		Major-General Sir Henry Clinton	died 1795
9 December 1778		Rear-Admiral Edward Hughes	died 1795
24 February 1779		James Harris	made GCB (civil) 2 January 1815
23 March 1779		Major-General Hector Munro	died 1806
5 May 1779		Randal MacDonnell, 6th Earl of Antrim	died 29 July 1791
13 November 1780		Lieutenant-General Richard Pierson	died 1781
13 November 1780		Thomas Wroughton	
14 November 1780		Admiral Sir George Rodney, 1st Baronet	died 24 May 1792
17 December 1781		Lieutenant-General Edward Ligonier, 1st Earl Ligonier	died 14 June 1782
29 May 1782		Captain John Jervis	made GCB 2 January 1815
8 January 1783		General George Augustus Eliott	died 6 July 1790
8 January 1783		General Charles Grey	died 14 November 1807
28 January 1785		Lieutenant-General Robert Boyd	died 1794
30 September 1785		Lieutenant-General Frederick Haldimand	died 5 June 1791
30 September 1785		Major-General Archibald Campbell	died 31 March 1791
20 December 1786		Lieutenant-General William Fawcett	died 1809
20 December 1786		Robert Monckton-Arundell, 4th Viscount Galway	died 23 July 1810
7 May 1788		Sir George Yonge, 5th Baronet	died 25 September 1812
7 May 1788		Vice-Admiral Alexander Hood	died 2 May 1814
6 June 1788		Lieutenant-General Robert Sloper	died 1802
16 December 1788		Morton Eden	made GCB (civil) 2 January 1815
15 August 1792		Lieutenant-General William Augustus Pitt	died 1809
15 August 1792		Lieutenant-General John Vaughan	died 8 June 1795
15 August 1792		Major-General William Medows	died 1813
15 August 1792		Major-General Robert Abercromby	made GCB 2 January 1815
27 September 1793		Charles Whitworth	made GCB (civil) 2 January 1815
30 May 1794		Rear-Admiral George Keith Elphinstone	made GCB 2 January 1815
30 May 1794		Captain Sir John Borlase Warren, 1st Baronet	made GCB 2 January 1815
18 November 1794		Major-General Adam Williamson	died 21 October 1798
1 July 1795		Sir Joseph Banks, 1st Baronet	made GCB (civil) 2 January 1815
22 July 1795		Major-General Ralph Abercromby	died 28 March 1801
17 February 1796		Rear-Admiral Hugh Cloberry Christian	died 1799
14 January 1797		Major-General Alured Clarke	made GCB 2 January 1815
14 January 1797		Major-General James Henry Craig	died 12 January 1812
27 May 1797		Rear-Admiral Horatio Nelson	died 21 October 1805
14 February 1798		Vice-Admiral John Colpoys	made GCB 2 January 1815
1799		Lieutenant-General Charles Stuart	died 25 May 1801
8 January 1800		Vice-Admiral Henry Harvey	died 1811
8 January 1800		Vice-Admiral Sir Andrew Mitchell	died 1806
14 May 1801		Rear-Admiral Thomas Graves	died 1814
28 May 1801		Major-General John Hely-Hutchinson	made GCB 2 January 1815
6 June 1801		Lieutenant-General Thomas Trigge	died 1814
6 June 1801		Rear-Admiral John Duckworth	made GCB 2 January 1815
5 September 1801		Rear-Admiral Sir James Saumarez, 1st Baronet	made GCB 2 January 1815
19 May 1802		Major-General Eyre Coote	made GCB 2 January 1815
16 February 1803		Major-General John Cradock	made GCB 2 January 1815
28 April 1803		Lieutenant-General Sir David Dundas	made GCB 2 January 1815
21 May 1804		Arthur Paget	made GCB (civil) 2 January 1815
28 August 1804		Major-General Arthur Wellesley	made GCB 2 January 1815
26 September 1804		Major-General George Ludlow	made GCB 2 January 1815
26 September 1804		Major-General John Moore	died 16 January 1809
26 September 1804		Commodore Samuel Hood	died 24 December 1814
26 September 1806		Rear-Admiral William Carnegie, 7th Earl of Northesk	made GCB 2 January 1815
26 September 1806		Rear-Admiral Sir Richard Strachan, 6th Baronet	made GCB 2 January 1815
29 March 1806		Rear-Admiral Alexander Cochrane	made GCB 2 January 1815
13 September 1806		Major-General Sir John Stuart	made GCB 2 January 1815
29 October 1806		Philip Francis	made GCB (civil) 2 January 1815
29 October 1806		Sir George Barlow, 1st Baronet	made GCB (civil) 2 January 1815
March 1808		Percy Smythe, 6th Viscount Strangford	made GCB (civil) 2 January 1815
15 October 1808		Rear-Admiral Richard Goodwin Keats	made GCB 2 January 1815
21 April 1809		Lieutenant-General Sir David Baird, 1st Baronet	made GCB 2 January 1815
21 April 1809		Lieutenant-General George Beckwith	made GCB 2 January 1815
21 April 1809		Lieutenant-General John Hope	made GCB 2 January 1815
21 April 1809		Major-General Brent Spencer	made GCB 2 January 1815
21 April 1809		Captain Thomas Cochrane, Lord Cochrane	expelled 15 July 1814
16 September 1809		Major-General John Coape Sherbrooke	made GCB 2 January 1815
16 October 1810		Lieutenant-General William Carr Beresford	made GCB 2 January 1815
22 February 1812		Lieutenant-General Thomas Graham	made GCB 2 January 1815
22 February 1812		Lieutenant-General Rowland Hill	made GCB 2 January 1815
22 February 1812		Major-General Sir Samuel Auchmuty	made GCB 2 January 1815
10 March 1812		Henry Wellesley	made GCB (civil) 2 January 1815
12 June 1812		Lieutenant-General Edward Paget	made GCB 2 January 1815
21 August 1812		Lieutenant-General Sir Stapleton Cotton, 6th Baronet	made GCB 2 January 1815
26 September 1812		Charles Stuart	made GCB (civil) 2 January 1815
10 October 1812		Major-General Isaac Brock	died 13 October 1812
1 February 1813		Admiral George Cranfield Berkeley	made GCB 2 January 1815
1 February 1813		Lieutenant-General Sir George Nugent, 1st Baronet	made GCB 2 January 1815
1 February 1813		Lieutenant-General William Keppel	made GCB 2 January 1815
1 February 1813		Lieutenant-General John Doyle	made GCB 2 January 1815
1 February 1813		Lieutenant-General Lord William Bentinck	made GCB 2 January 1815
1 February 1813		Major-General James Leith	made GCB 2 January 1815
1 February 1813		Major-General Thomas Picton	made GCB 2 January 1815
1 February 1813		Major-General Lowry Cole	made GCB 2 January 1815
1 February 1813		Major-General Charles Stewart	made GCB 2 January 1815
29 June 1813		Lieutenant-General the Hon. Alexander Hope	made GCB 2 January 1815
29 June 1813		Major-General Sir Henry Clinton	made GCB 2 January 1815
11 September 1813		Lieutenant-General George Ramsay, 9th Earl of Dalhousie	made GCB 2 January 1815
11 September 1813		Lieutenant-General William Stewart	made GCB 2 January 1815
11 September 1813		Major-General George Murray	made GCB 2 January 1815
11 September 1813		Major-General The Hon. Sir Edward Pakenham	made GCB 2 January 1815
12 July 1814		Admiral William Young	made GCB 2 January 1815
16 August 1814		Colonel William Frederick Henry, Prince of Orange	made GCB 2 January 1815

== Sources ==
- William A. Shaw and G. D. Burtchaell, The Knights of England, volume I (London, 1906) pages 167-179
