= Order of the Bath =

British order of chivalry established in 1725

Most Honourable Order of the Bath
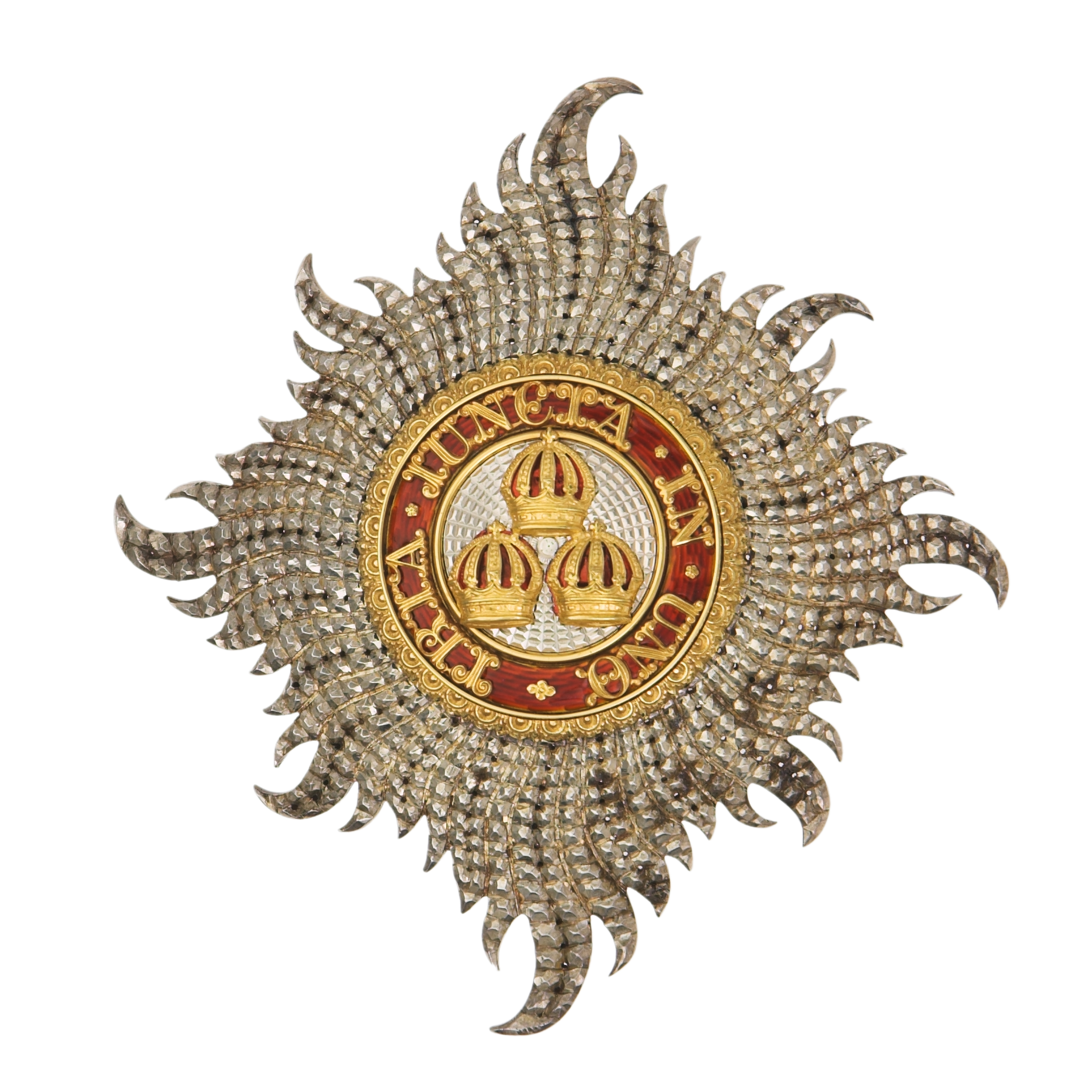
- Badge of the Order of the Bath (Civil Division)

Awarded by the monarch of the United Kingdom
- Type: Order of chivalry
- Established: 18 May 1725; 301 years ago
- Country: United Kingdom
- Motto: Tria juncta in uno ('Three joined in one') (Civil Division); Ich dien ('I serve') (Military Division)
- Awarded for: Service to the Crown
- Status: Currently constituted
- Founder: George I
- Sovereign: Charles III
- Great Master: William, Prince of Wales
- Grades: Knight/Dame Grand Cross (GCB); Knight/Dame Commander (KCB/DCB); Companion (CB)
- Former grades: Knight Companion (KB)

Precedence
- Next (higher): Order of St Patrick
- Next (lower): Order of the Star of India
- Order of the Bath ribbon bar

Coat of arms of the British monarch as sovereign of the Order of the Bath

The Most Honourable Order of the Bath is a British order of chivalry founded by King George I on 18 May 1725. Recipients of the Order are usually senior military officers or senior civil servants, and the monarch bestows it on the advice of His Majesty's Government. The name derives from an elaborate medieval ceremony for preparing a candidate to receive his knighthood, of which ritual bathing (as a symbol of purification) was an element. While not all knights went through such an elaborate ceremony, knights so created were known as "knights of the Bath".

George I constituted the Knights of the Bath as a regular military order. He did not revive the order, which did not previously exist, in the sense of a body of knights governed by a set of statutes and whose numbers were replenished when vacancies occurred.

The Order consists of the Sovereign of the United Kingdom (currently King Charles III), the Great Master (currently William, Prince of Wales), and three Classes of members:

- Knight Grand Cross (GCB) or Dame Grand Cross (GCB);
- Knight Commander (KCB) or Dame Commander (DCB); and
- Companion (CB).

Members belong to either the Civil Division or the Military Division. Knight Companion (KB), the order's only class prior to 1815, is no longer an option. Commonwealth citizens who are not subjects of the British monarch and foreign nationals may be made honorary members.

Appointments are announced in The Gazette.

The Order of the Bath is the fourth most senior of the British orders of chivalry, after the Order of the Garter, the Order of the Thistle, and the (dormant) Order of St Patrick.

== History ==
=== Knights of the Bath ===
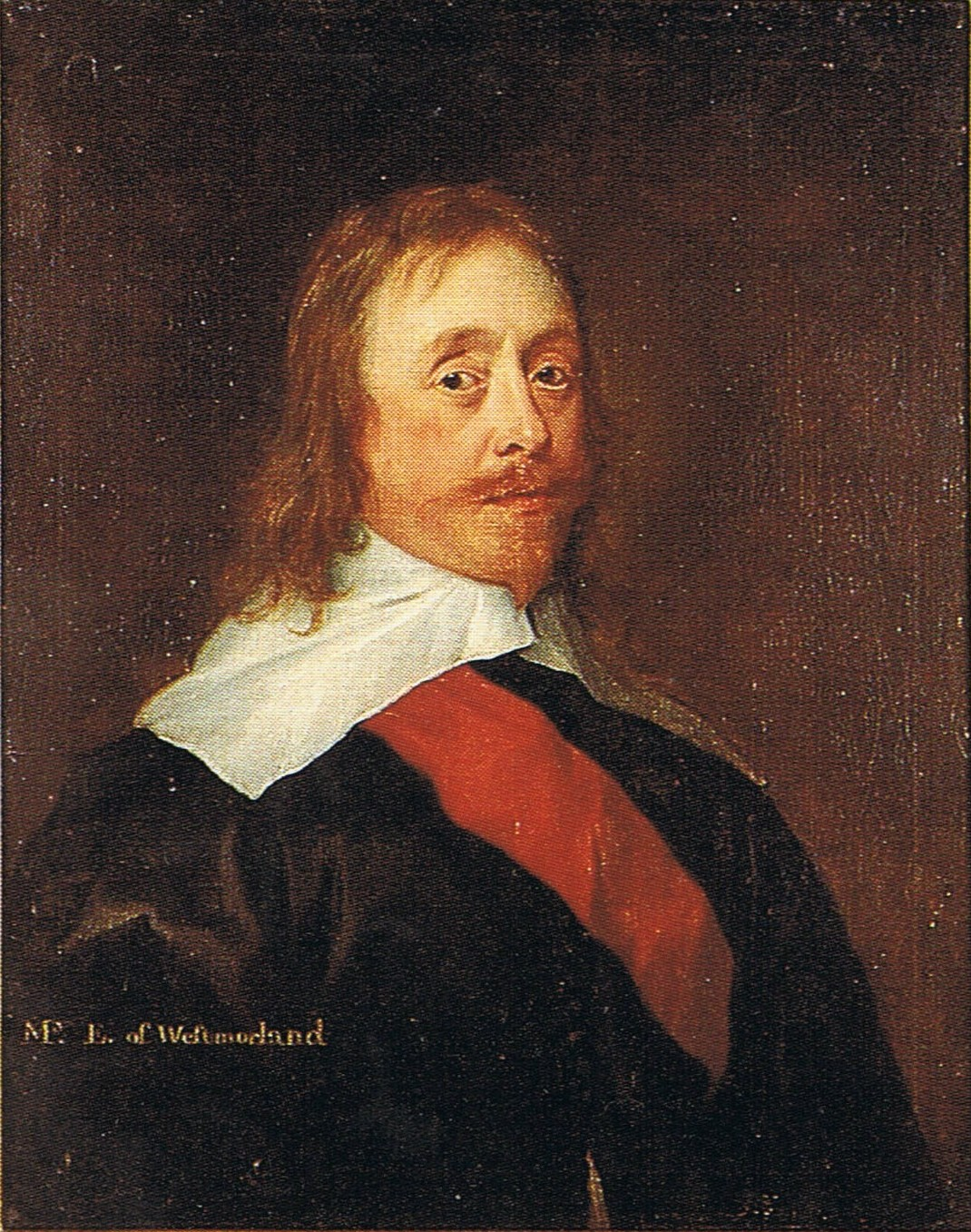
Mildmay Fane, 2nd Earl of Westmorland, KB, with sash, c. 1630

In the Middle Ages, a knighthood was often conferred with elaborate ceremonies. These usually involved the knight-to-be taking a bath (possibly symbolic of spiritual purification), during which he was instructed in the duties of knighthood by more senior knights. He was then put to bed to dry. Clothed in a special robe, he was led with music to the chapel where he spent the night in a vigil. At dawn, he made confession and attended Mass, then retired to his bed to sleep until it was fully daylight. He was then brought before the King, who after instructing two senior knights to buckle the spurs to the knight-elect's heels, fastened a belt around his waist, then struck him on the neck (with either a hand or a sword), thus making him a knight. It was this accolade which was the essential act in creating a knight, and a simpler ceremony developed, conferring knighthood merely by striking or touching the knight-to-be on the shoulder with a sword, or 'dubbing' him, as is still done today. In the early medieval period, the difference seems to have been that the full ceremonies were used for men from more prominent families.

From the coronation of Henry IV in 1399, the full ceremonies were restricted to major royal occasions, such as coronations, investitures of the Prince of Wales or royal dukes, and royal weddings, and the knights so created became known as Knights of the Bath. Knights Bachelor continued to be created with the simpler form of ceremony. The last occasion on which Knights of the Bath were created was the coronation of Charles II in 1661.

From at least 1625, and possibly from the reign of James I, Knights of the Bath were using the motto Tria juncta in uno (Latin for 'Three joined in one'), and wearing as a badge three crowns within a plain gold oval. These were both subsequently adopted by the Order of the Bath; a similar design of badge is still worn by members of the Civil Division. Their symbolism however is not entirely clear. The 'three joined in one' may be a reference to the kingdoms of England, Scotland, and either France or Ireland, which were held (or claimed in the case of France) by English and, later, British monarchs. This would correspond to the three crowns in the badge. Another explanation of the motto is that it refers to the Holy Trinity. Nicolas quotes a source (although he is sceptical of it) who claims that prior to James I the motto was Tria numina juncta in uno (three powers/gods joined in one), but from the reign of James I, the word numina was dropped, and the motto understood to mean Tria [regna] juncta in uno (three kingdoms joined in one).

=== Foundation of the order ===
The prime mover in the establishment of the Order of the Bath was John Anstis, Garter King of Arms, England's highest heraldic officer. Robert Walpole, the de facto head of His Majesty's government, was also eager to have the Order created to reduce the Duke of Montagu's financial claims on the government for a failed attempt at colonial expansion. Thus, allowing Montagu to become the Order's first Great Master, would encourage him to lay aside, or at least modify, his immense financial claim on the government. Sir Anthony Wagner, a more recent holder of the office of Garter King of Arms (1961–1978), wrote of Anstis's motivations:

It was Martin Leake's opinion that the trouble and opposition Anstis met with in establishing himself as Garter [King of Arms] so embittered him against the heralds that when at last in 1718 he succeeded, he made it his prime object to aggrandise himself and his office at their expense. It is clear at least that he set out to make himself indispensable to the Earl Marshal, which was not hard, their political principles being congruous and their friendship already established, but also to Sir Robert Walpole and the Whig ministry, which can by no means have been easy, considering his known attachment to the Pretender and the circumstances under which he came into office. ... The main object of Anstis's next move, the revival or institution of the Order of the Bath was probably that which it in fact secured, of ingratiating him with the all-powerful Prime Minister Sir Robert Walpole.

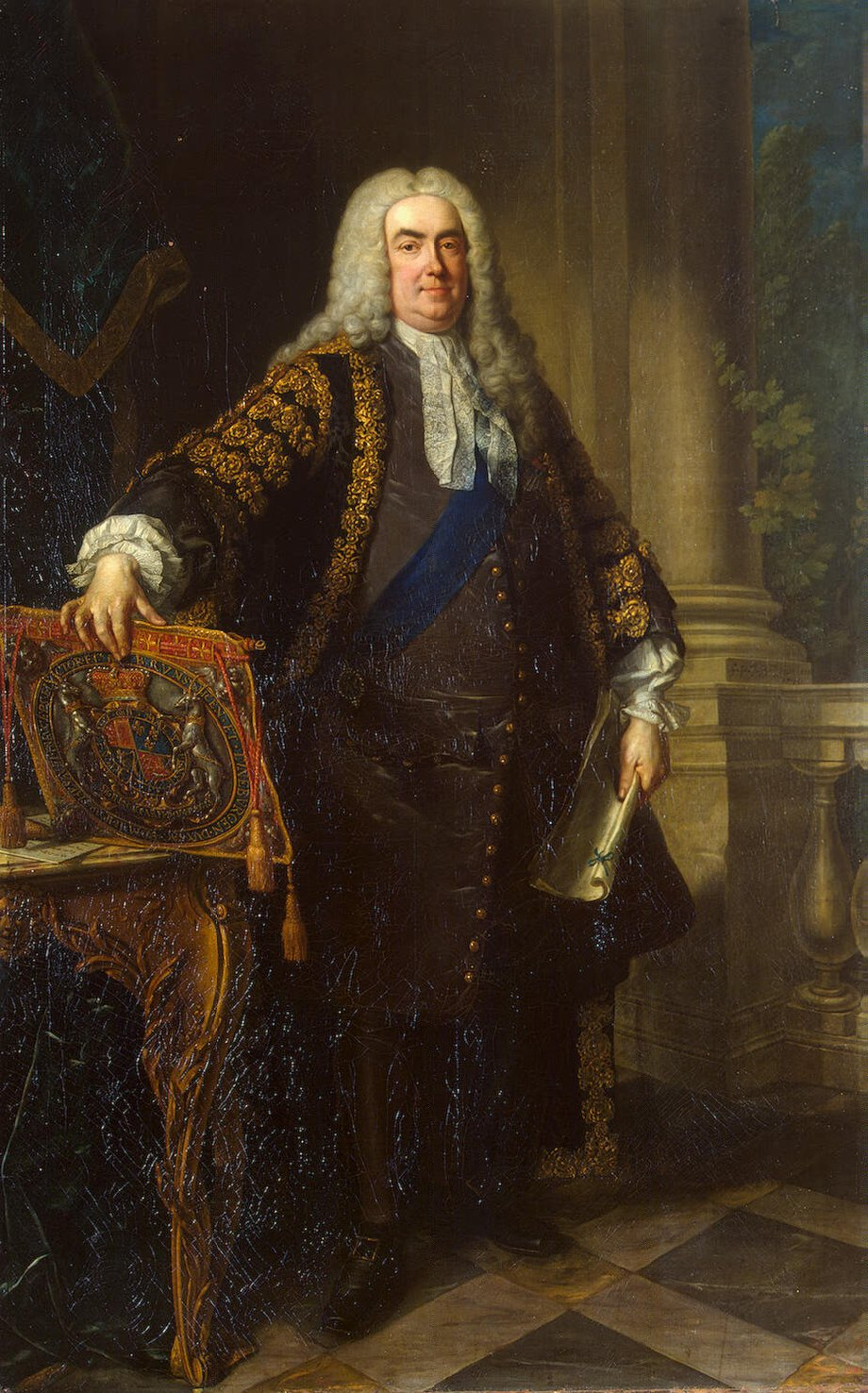
Sir Robert Walpole, who as Prime Minister used the Order for political patronage

The use of honours in the early eighteenth century differed considerably from the modern honours system, in which hundreds, if not thousands, of people each year receive honours on the basis of deserving accomplishments. The only honours available at that time were hereditary (not life) peerages and baronetcies, knighthoods, and the Order of the Garter (or the Order of the Thistle for Scots), none of which were bestowed in large numbers (the Garter and the Thistle are limited to twenty-four and sixteen living members respectively). The political environment was also significantly different from today:

The Sovereign still exercised a power to be reckoned with in the eighteenth century. The Court remained the centre of the political world. The King was limited in that he had to choose Ministers who could command a majority in Parliament, but the choice remained his. The leader of an administration still had to command the King's personal confidence and approval. A strong following in Parliament depended on being able to supply places, pensions, and other marks of Royal favour to the government's supporters.

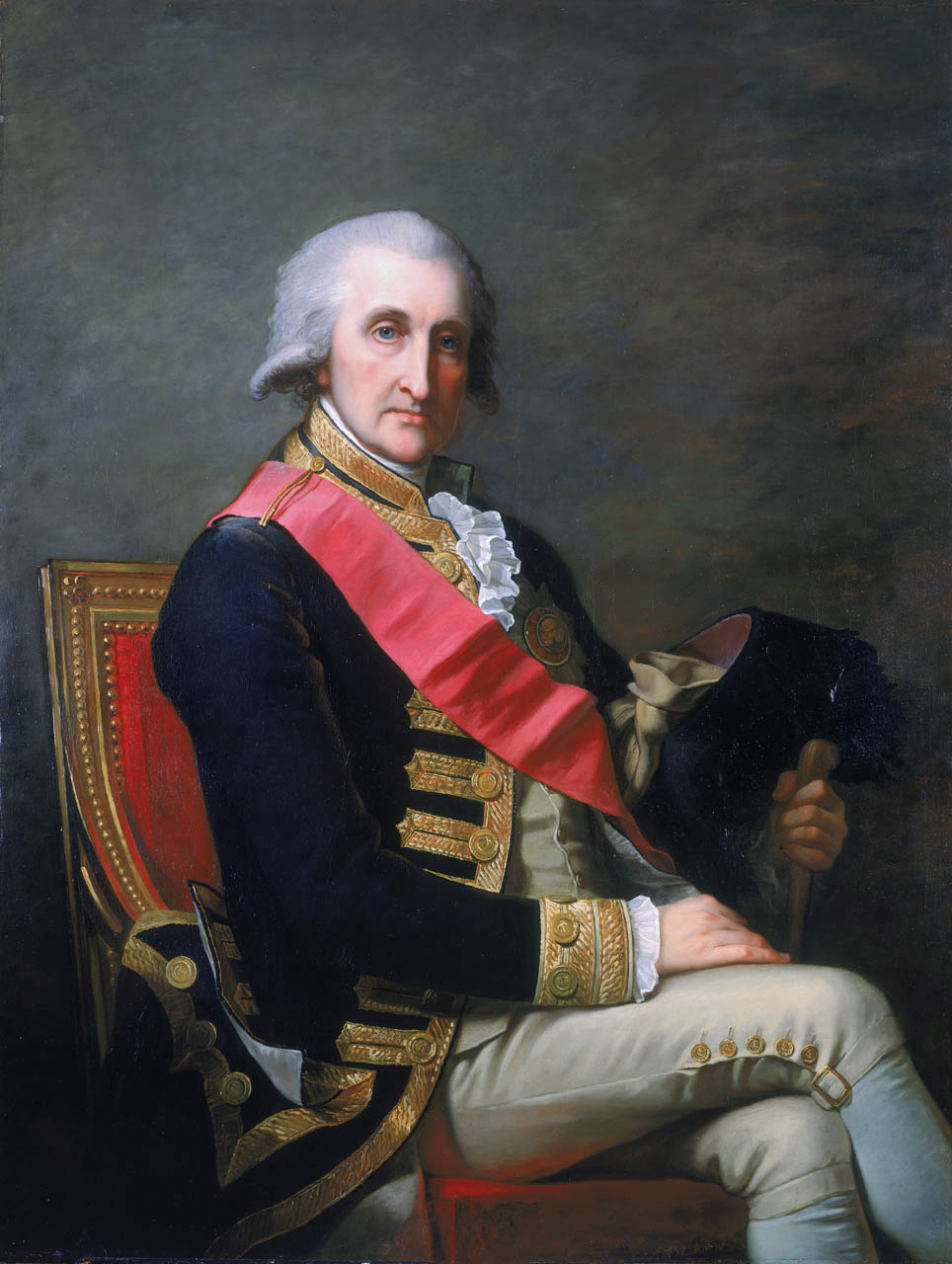
Admiral Lord Rodney (appointed a Knight Companion in 1780) wearing the riband and star of the Order

The attraction of the new Order for Walpole was that it would provide a source of such favours to strengthen his political position. He made sure that most of the 36 new honorees were peers and MPs who would provide him with useful connections. Crucially, roughly half of the founder-knights were descendants of 17th century knights of the bath. George I having agreed to Walpole's proposal, Anstis was commissioned to draft statutes for the Order of the Bath. Early proposals for admit any man were dropped and Anstis included the traditional definition of a gentlemen for non-noble knights was included in the statutes, proof of ‘noble ancestry’ by which was meant armigerous birth of at least three generations on both paternal and maternal sides. As noted above, he adopted the motto and badge used by the Knights of the Bath, as well as the colour of the riband and mantle, and the ceremony for creating a knight. The rest of the statutes were mostly based on those of the Order of the Garter, of which he was an officer (as Garter King of Arms). The Order was founded by letters patent under the Great Seal dated 18 May 1725; 301 years ago, and the statutes issued the following week.

The Order initially consisted of the Sovereign, a Prince of the blood Royal as Principal Knight, a Great Master, and thirty-five Knights Companion. Seven officers (see below) were attached to the Order. These provided yet another opportunity for political patronage, as they were to be sinecures at the disposal of the Great Master, supported by fees from the knights. Despite the fact that the Bath was represented as a military Order, only a few military officers were among the initial appointments (see List of knights companion of the Order of the Bath). They may be broken down into categories as follows (some are classified in more than one category):

- Members of the House of Commons: 14
- The Royal Household or sinecures: 11
- Diplomats: 4
- The Walpole family, including the Prime Minister: 3
- Naval and Army officers: 3
- Irish peers: 2
- Country gentlemen with Court appointments: 2

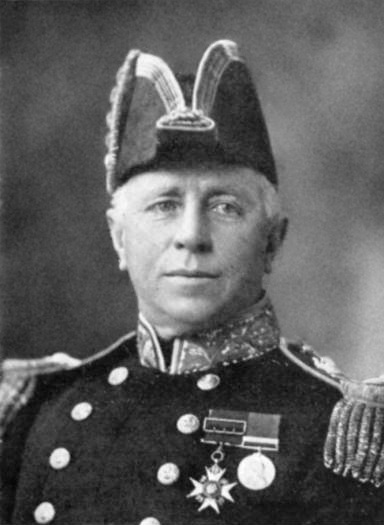
Admiral of the Fleet Sir George Callaghan wearing the insignia of a military Companion of the Order

The majority of the new Knights Companions were knighted by the King, and invested with their ribands and badges on 27 May 1725. Although the statutes set out the full medieval ceremony which was to be used for creating knights, this was not performed, and indeed, was possibly never intended to be, as the original statutes contained a provision allowing the Great Master to dispense Knights Companion from these requirements. The original knights were dispensed from all the medieval ceremonies with the exception of the Installation, which was performed in the Order's Chapel, the Henry VII Chapel in Westminster Abbey, on 17 June. This precedent was followed until 1812, after which the Installation was also dispensed with, until its revival in the twentieth century. The ceremonies however remained part of the Statutes until 1847.

Although the initial appointments to the Order were largely political, from the 1770s, appointments to the Order were increasingly made for non-aristocratic naval, military, or diplomatic achievements. This is partly due to the conflicts Britain was engaged in over this period. The Peninsular War resulted in so many deserving candidates for the Bath, that a statute was issued allowing the appointment of Extra Knights in time of war, who were to be additional to the numerical limits imposed by the statutes, and whose number was not subject to any restrictions. Another statute, this one issued some 80 years earlier, had also added a military note to the Order. Each knight was required, under certain circumstances, to supply and support four men-at-arms for a period not exceeding 42 days in any year, to serve in any part of Great Britain. This company was to be captained by the Great Master, who had to supply four trumpeters, and was also to appoint eight officers for this body. However, the statute was never invoked.

=== Restructuring in 1815 ===
In January 1815, after the end of the Peninsular War, the Prince Regent (later George IV) expanded the Order of the Bath

to the end that those Officers who have had the opportunities of signalising themselves by eminent services during the late war may share in the honours of the said Order, and that their names may be delivered down to remote posterity, accompanied by the marks of distinction which they have so nobly earned.

The Order was now to consist of three classes: Knights Grand Cross, Knights Commander, and Companions. At the same time, the large and small Naval Gold Medals were suspended, while the bearers became Knights Commander and Companions, respectively. The existing Knights Companion (of which there were 60) became Knight Grand Cross; this class was limited to 72 members, of which twelve could be appointed for civil or diplomatic services. The military members had to be of the rank of at least major-general or rear admiral. The Knights Commander were limited to 180, exclusive of foreign nationals holding British commissions, up to ten of whom could be appointed as honorary Knights Commander. They had to be of the rank of lieutenant-colonel or post-captain. The number of Companions was not specified, but they had to have received a medal or been mentioned in despatches since the start of the war in 1803. A list of about 500 names was subsequently published. Two further officers were appointed, an 'Officer of arms attendant on the Knights Commanders and Companions', and a 'Secretary appertaining to the Knights Commanders and Companions'. The large increase in numbers caused some complaints that such an expansion would reduce the prestige of the Order.

=== Victorian era ===
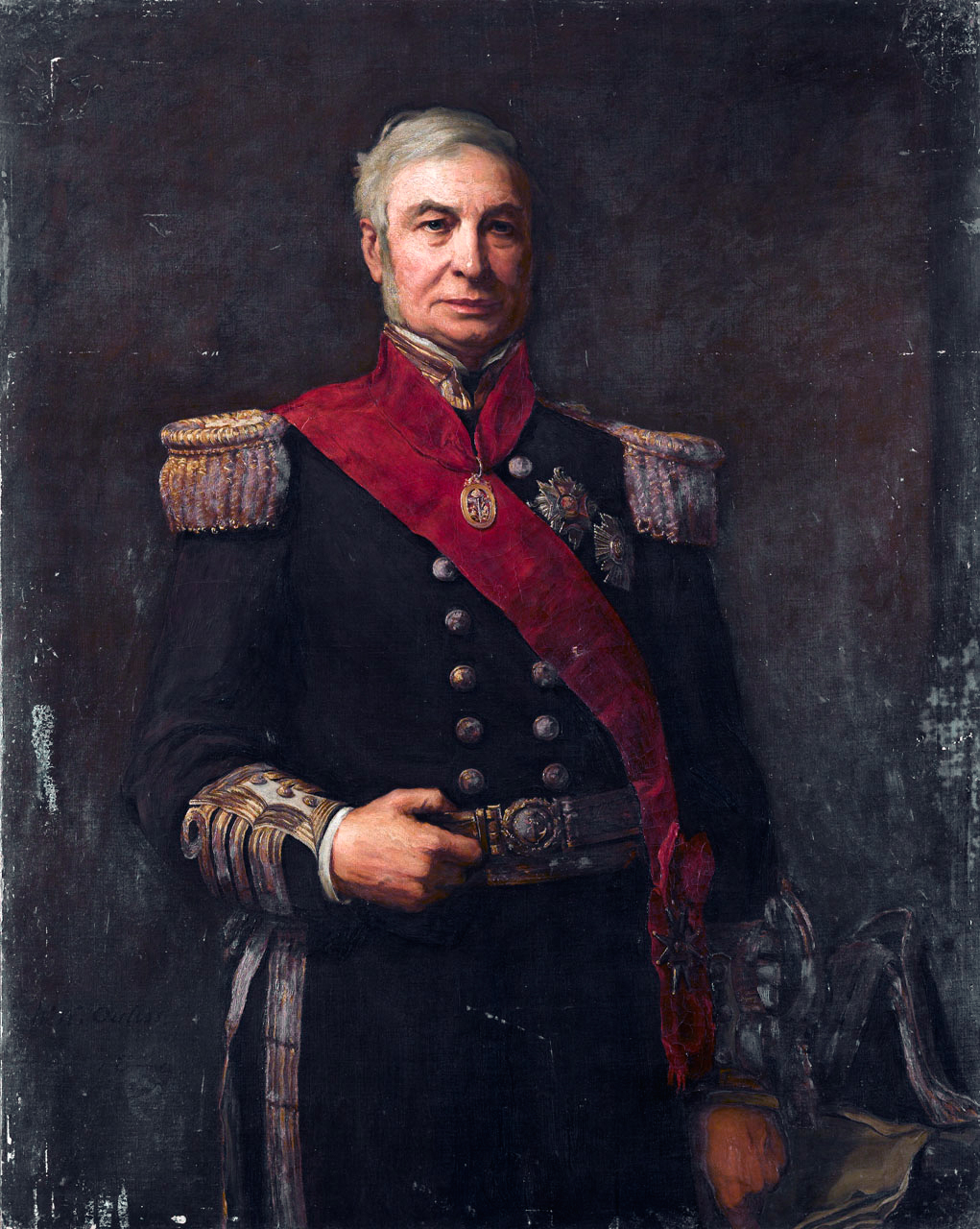
Sir Alexander Milne (1808–1896) was concurrently KCB (civil division) and GCB (military division); he is pictured wearing both sets of insignia.

In 1847, Queen Victoria issued new statutes eliminating all references to an exclusively military Order. As well as removing the word 'Military' from the full name of the Order, this opened up the grades of Knight Commander and Companion to civil appointments, and the Military and Civil Divisions of the Order were established. New numerical limits were imposed, and the opportunity also taken to regularise the 1815 expansion of the Order. The 1847 statutes also abolished all the medieval ritual, but they did introduce a formal Investiture ceremony, conducted by the Sovereign wearing the Mantle and insignia of the Order, attended by the Officers and as many GCBs as possible, in their Mantles.

In 1850, a special statute authorised appointments of Knight Commander and Companion, in the Military Division, to Commissariat and Medical officers serving with the Army and Navy, including those serving with the East India Company.

In 1859, a further edition of the Statutes was issued; the changes related mainly to the costs associated with the Order. Prior to this date, it had been the policy that the insignia (which were provided by the Crown) were to be returned on the death of the holder; the exception had been foreigners who had been appointed honorary members. In addition, foreigners had usually been provided with stars made of silver and diamonds, whereas ordinary members had only embroidered stars. The decision was made to issue silver stars to all members, and require the return of only the Collar. The Crown had also been paying the fees due to the officers of the Order for members who had been appointed for the services in the recent war. The fees were abolished, and replaced with a salary of approximately the same average value. The offices of Genealogist and Messenger were abolished, and those of Registrar and Secretary combined.

=== Contemporary era ===
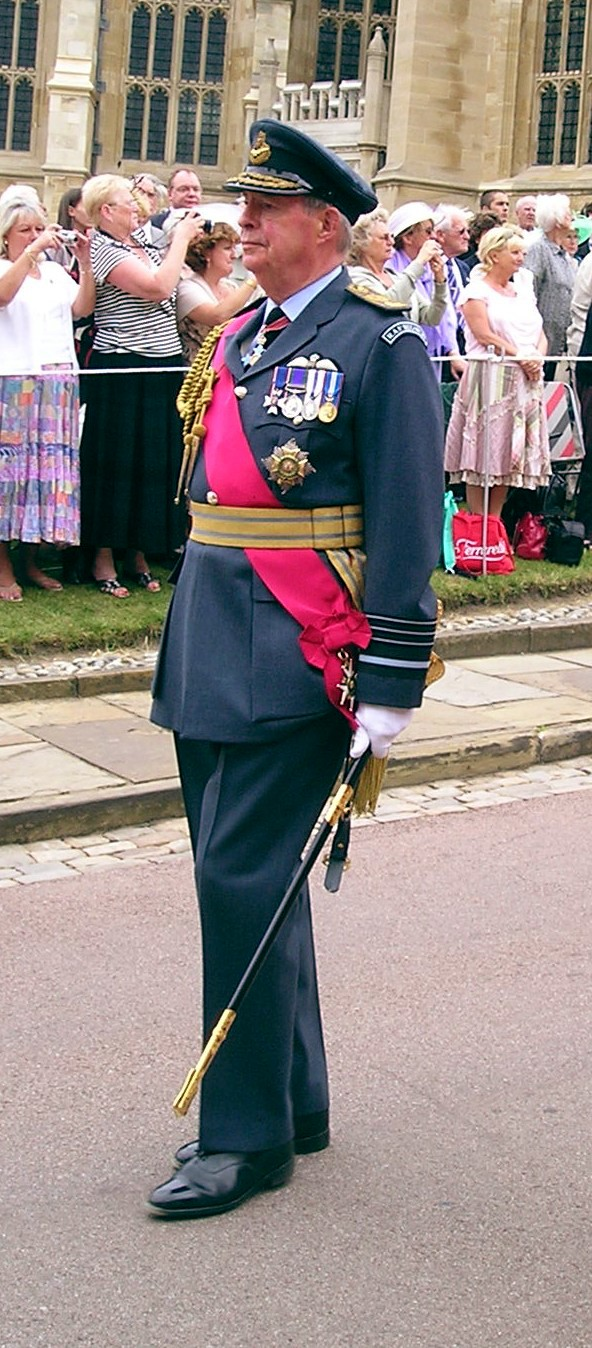
Air Chief Marshal Sir Richard Johns in his service dress uniform, wearing the star, riband, and badge of a military Knight Grand Cross of the Order of the Bath

In 1910, after his accession to the throne, George V ordered the revival of the Installation ceremony, perhaps prompted by the first Installation ceremony of the more junior Order of St Michael and St George, held a few years earlier, and the building of a new chapel for the Order of the Thistle in 1911. The Installation ceremony took place on 22 July 1913 in the Henry VII Chapel, and Installations have been held at regular intervals since.

Prior to the 1913 Installation, it was necessary to adapt the chapel to accommodate the larger number of members. An appeal was made to the members of the Order, and following the Installation a surplus remained. A Committee was formed from the Officers to administer the 'Bath Chapel Fund', and over time this committee has come to consider other matters than purely financial ones.

Another revision of the statutes of the Order was undertaken in 1925, to consolidate the 41 additional statutes which had been issued since the 1859 revision.

Women were admitted to the Order in 1971. In the 1971 New Year Honours, Jean Nunn became the first woman admitted to the order. In 1975, Princess Alice, Duchess of Gloucester, an aunt of Elizabeth II, became the first woman to reach the highest rank, Dame Grand Cross. Princess Alice (née Douglas-Montagu-Scott) was a direct descendant of the Order's first Great Master, and her husband, who had died the previous year, had also held that office. The second Dame Grand Cross, Sally Davies, was appointed in the 2020 New Year Honours.

== Composition ==
=== Sovereign ===
The British Sovereign is the Sovereign of the Order of the Bath. As with all honours, except those in the Sovereign's personal gift, (Note: The Order of the Garter, the Order of the Thistle, the Order of Merit and the Royal Victorian Order are all bestowed at the Sovereign's discretion and ministerial advice is not required.) the Sovereign makes all appointments to the Order on the advice of the Government.

=== Great Master ===
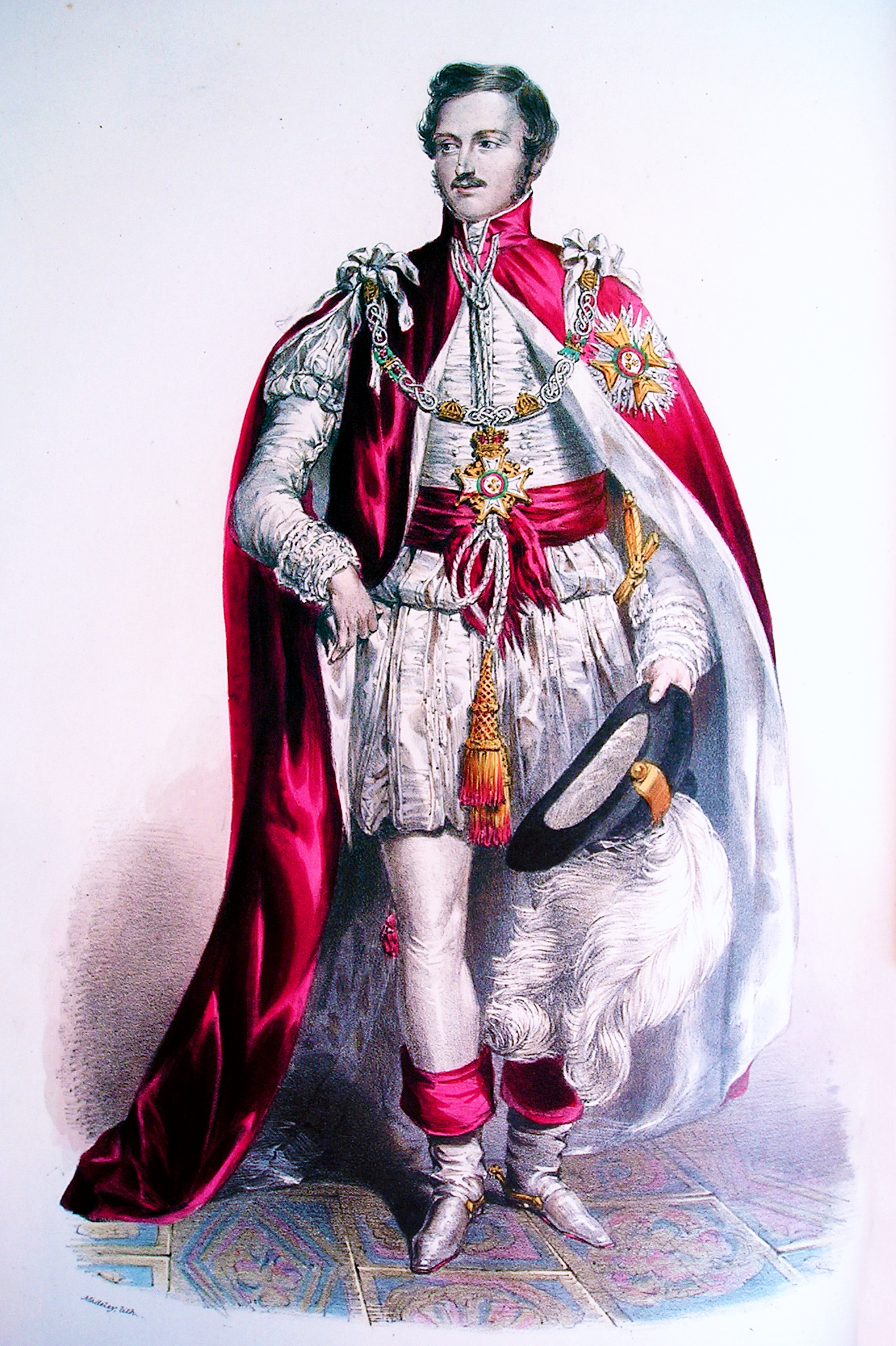
Prince Albert, the Prince Consort, Great Master 1843–1861. During the 19th century, Knights Grand Cross wore their mantles over imitations of 17th-century dress. They now wear them over contemporary attire.

The next-most senior member of the Order is the Great Master, of which there have been ten:

- 1725–1749 – John Montagu, 2nd Duke of Montagu
- 1749–1767 – vacant
- 1767–1827 – Prince Frederick, Duke of York and Albany
- 1827–1830 – Prince William, Duke of Clarence and St Andrews (later King William IV)
- 1830–1837 – vacant
- 1837–1843 – Prince Augustus Frederick, Duke of Sussex
- 1843–1861 – Albert, Prince Consort
- 1861–1897 – vacant
- 1897–1901 – Albert Edward, Prince of Wales (later King Edward VII)
- 1901–1942 – Prince Arthur, Duke of Connaught and Strathearn
- 1942–1974 – Prince Henry, Duke of Gloucester
- 1974–2022 – Charles, Prince of Wales (later King Charles III)
- 2022–2024 – vacant
- 2024–present – William, Prince of Wales

Originally a Prince of the Blood Royal, as the Principal Knight Companion, ranked next after the sovereign. This position was joined to that of the Great Master in the statutes of 1847. The Great Master and Principal Knight is now either a descendant of George I or 'some other exalted personage'; the holder of the office has custody of the seal of the order and is responsible for enforcing the statutes.

=== Members ===
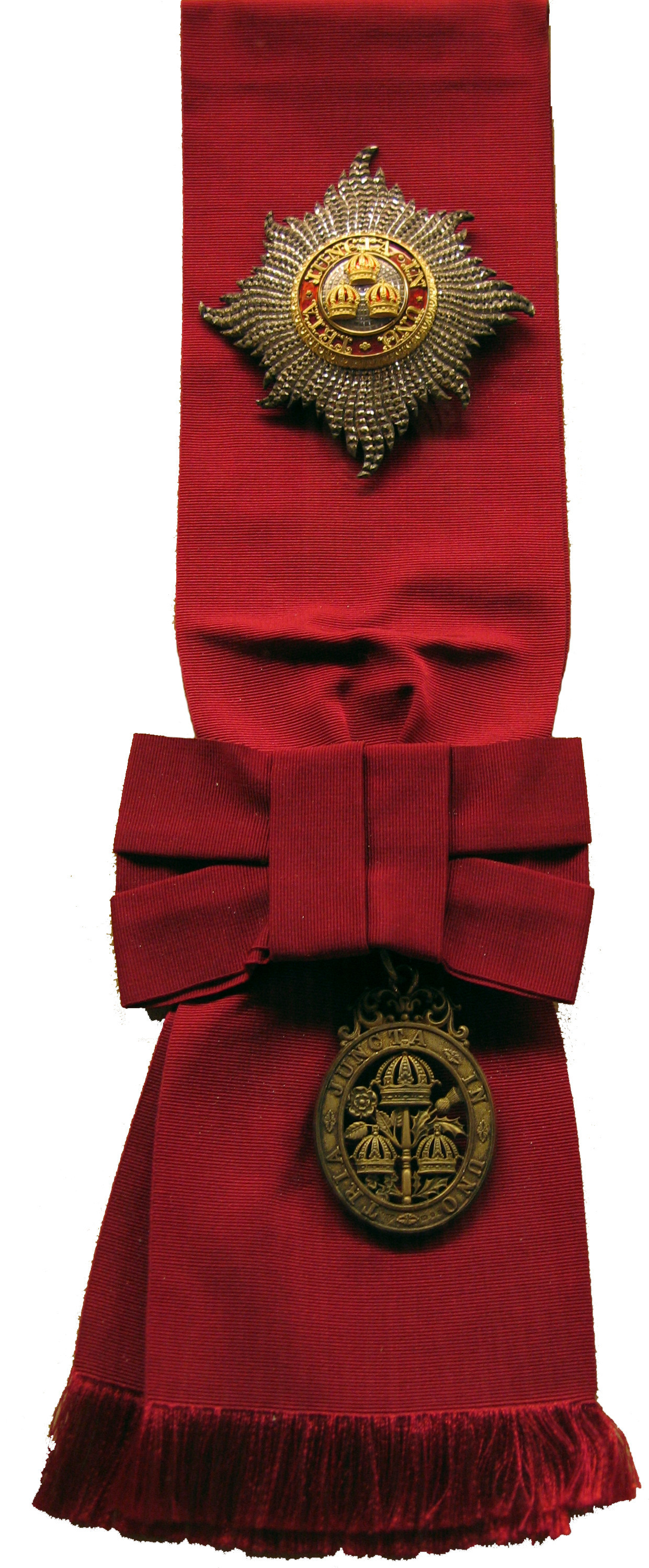
Sash and star of Grand Cross, civil division

The statutes also provide for the following:

- 120 Knights or Dames Grand Cross (GCB) (of whom the Great Master is the First and Principal);
- 355 Knights Commander (KCB) or Dames Commander (DCB); and
- 1,925 Companions (CB).

Regular membership is limited to citizens of the United Kingdom and of other Commonwealth countries of which the British monarch is Sovereign. Appointees are usually officers of the armed forces or senior civil servants, such as permanent secretaries.

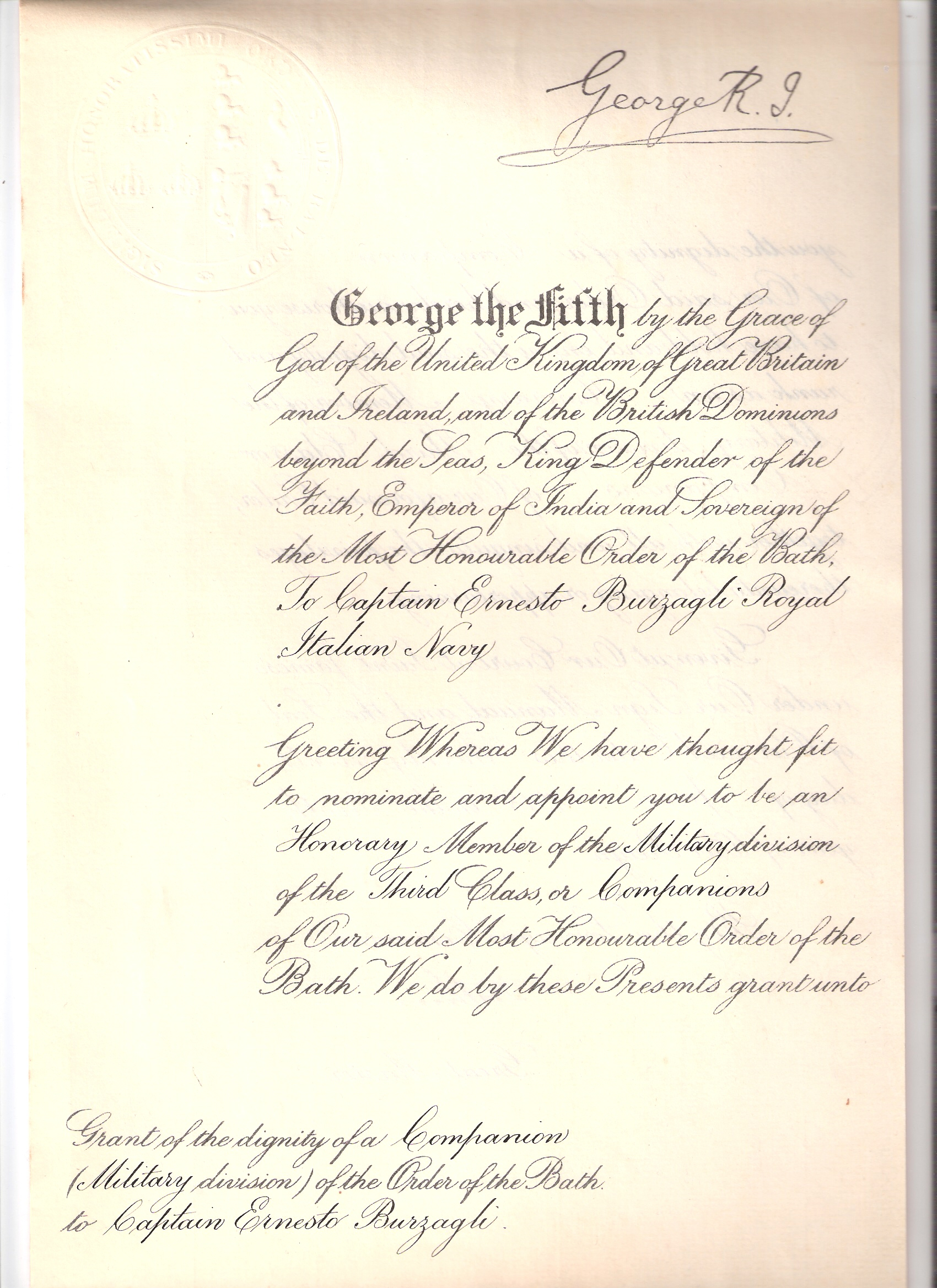
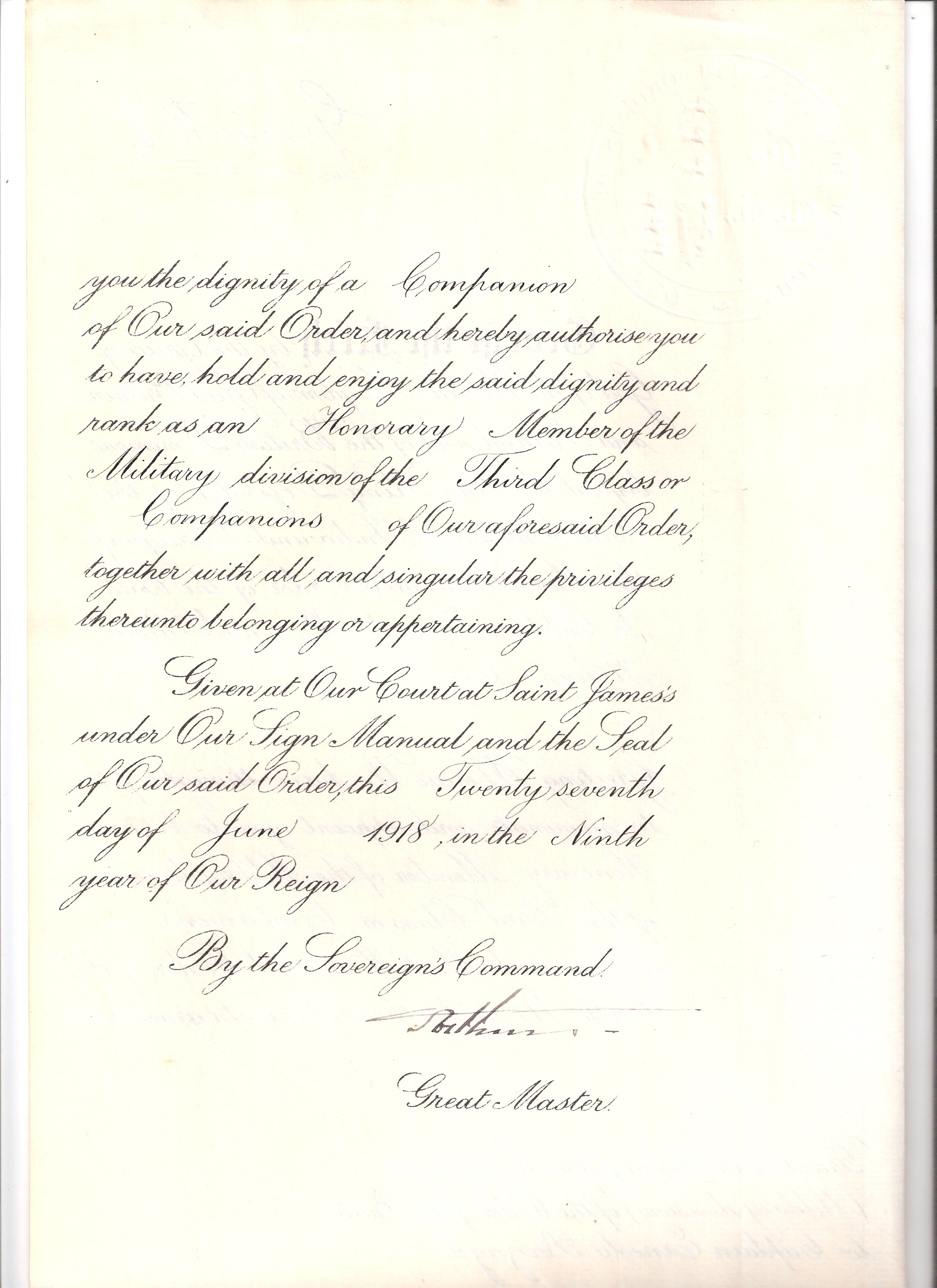
Warrant appointing Italian captain (later admiral) Ernesto Burzagli as an honorary Companion of the Order

Members appointed to the Civil Division must "by their personal services to [the] crown or by the performance of public duties have merited ... royal favour." Appointments to the Military Division are restricted by the minimum rank of the individual. GCBs hold the rank of admiral in the Royal Navy, general in the British Army or Royal Marines, or air chief marshal in the Royal Air Force. KCBs must at least hold the rank of vice admiral, lieutenant general in the Army or Marines, or air marshal. CBs tend be of the rank of rear admiral, major general in the Army, Royal Navy or Royal Marines, or air vice marshal in the Royal Air Force, and in addition must have been Mentioned in Despatches for distinction in a command position in a combat situation, although the latter is no longer a requirement. Non-line officers (e.g. engineers, medics) may be appointed only for meritorious service in wartime.

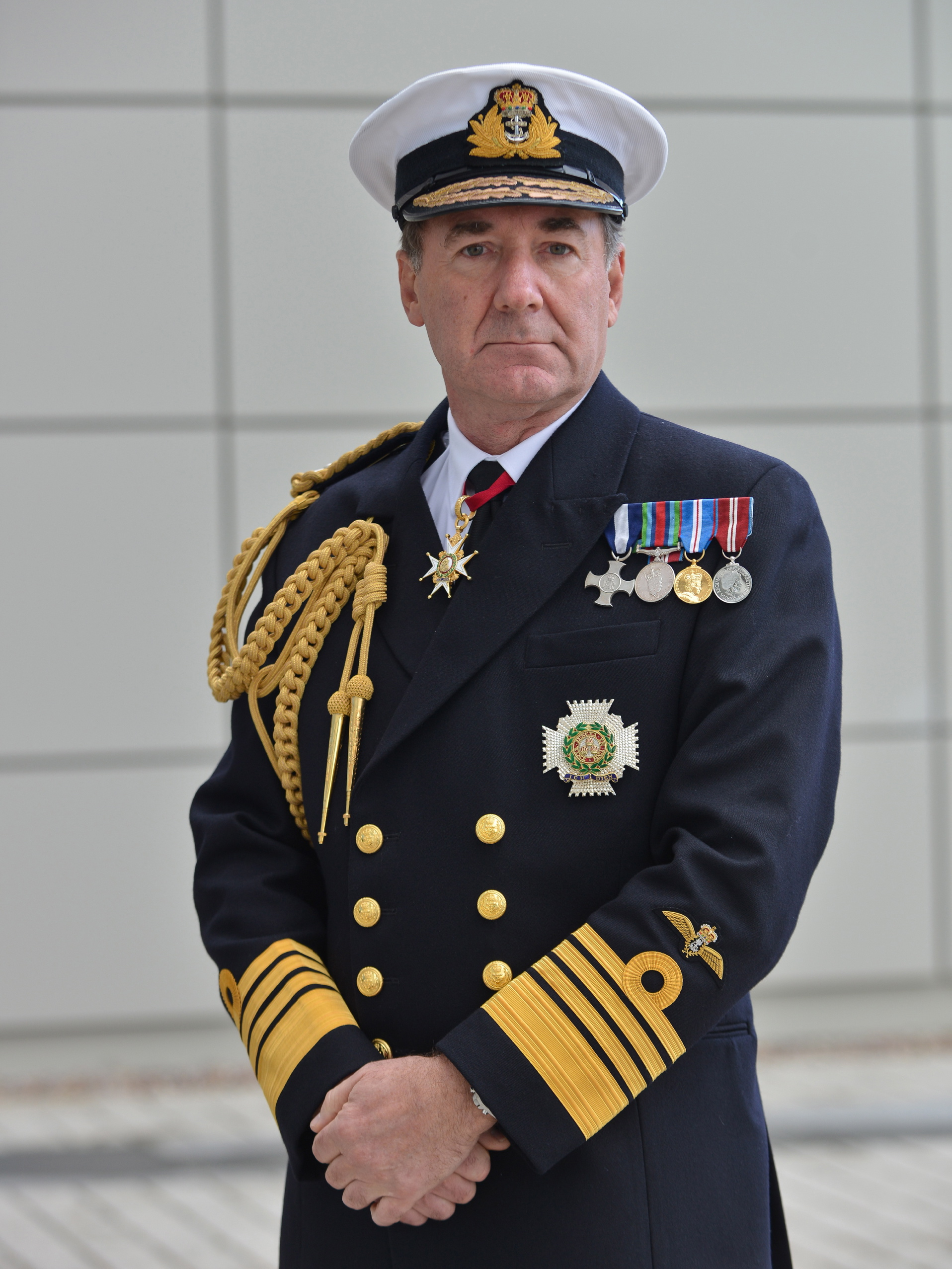
Admiral Sir George Zambellas KCB (military division)

Commonwealth citizens not subjects of the British monarch and foreigners may be made honorary members. Queen Elizabeth II established the custom of appointing visiting (republican) heads of state honorary GCBs, for example Gustav Heinemann and Josip Broz Tito (in 1972), Ronald Reagan (in 1989), Lech Wałęsa (in 1991), Censu Tabone (in 1992), Fernando Henrique Cardoso, George H. W. Bush (in 1993), Nicolas Sarkozy (in 2008), and Susilo Bambang Yudhoyono (in 2012), as well as Turkish President Abdullah Gül, Slovenian President Danilo Türk, Mexican President Felipe Calderón, and South African President Jacob Zuma (royal heads of state are instead usually made Stranger Knights and Ladies Companion of the Order of the Garter). Foreign generals are also often given honorary appointments to the Order, for example: Marshal Ferdinand Foch and Marshal Joseph Joffre during the First World War; Marshal Georgy Zhukov, King Abdul-Aziz of Saudi Arabia, General Dwight D. Eisenhower, General George C. Marshall, General Douglas MacArthur, General George S. Patton Jr. during the Second World War; and General Norman Schwarzkopf and General Colin Powell after the Gulf War. A more controversial member of the Order was Robert Mugabe, whose honour was stripped by the Queen, on the advice of the Foreign Secretary, David Miliband, on 25 June 2008 "as a mark of revulsion at the abuse of human rights and abject disregard for the democratic process in Zimbabwe over which President Mugabe has presided."

Honorary members do not count towards the numerical limits in each class. In addition, the statutes allow the Sovereign to exceed the limits in time of war or other exceptional circumstances.

=== Officers ===
The office of Dean is held by the Dean of Westminster. The King of Arms, responsible for heraldry, is known as Bath King of Arms; he is not, however, a member of the College of Arms, like many heralds. The Order's Usher is known as the Gentleman Usher of the Scarlet Rod; he does not, unlike his Order of the Garter equivalent (the Gentleman Usher of the Black Rod) perform any duties in the House of Lords.

There were originally seven officers, each of whom was to receive fees from the Knights Companion both on appointment, and annually thereafter. The office of Messenger was abolished in 1859. The office of Genealogist was abolished at the same time, but revived in 1913. The offices of Registrar and Secretary were formally merged in 1859, although the two positions had been held concurrently for the previous century. An Officer of Arms and a Secretary for the Knights Commander and Companions were established in 1815, but abolished in 1847. The office of Deputy Secretary was created in 1925.

Under the Hanoverian kings, certain of the officers also held heraldic office. The office of Blanc Coursier Herald of Arms was attached to that of the Genealogist, Brunswick Herald of Arms to the Gentleman Usher, and Bath King of Arms was also made Gloucester King of Arms with heraldic jurisdiction over Wales. This was the result of a move by Anstis to give the holders of these sinecures greater security; the offices of the Order of the Bath were held at the pleasure of the Great Master, while appointments to the heraldic offices were made by the King under the Great Seal and were for life.

== Habit and insignia ==
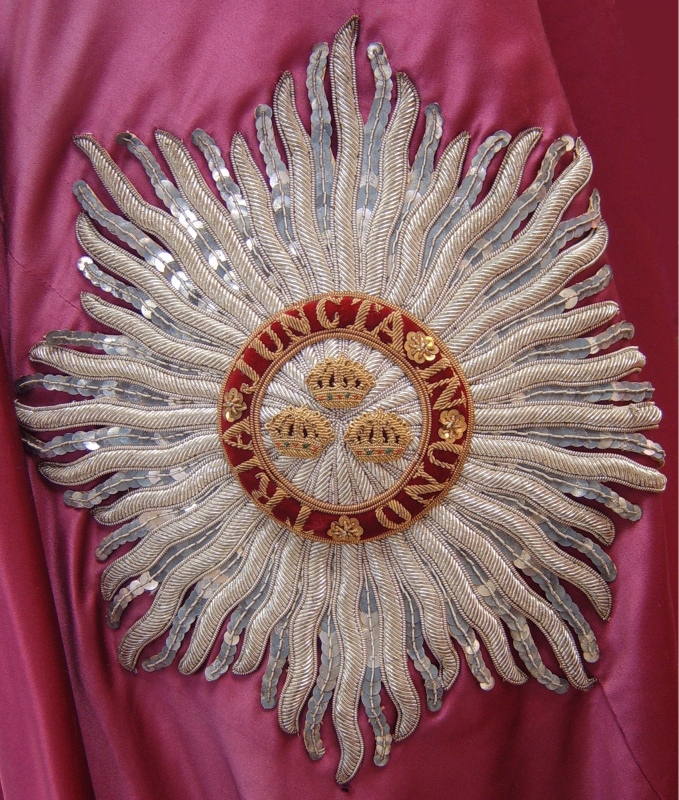
An embroidered representation, or "chaton", of the star of the civil division of the Order

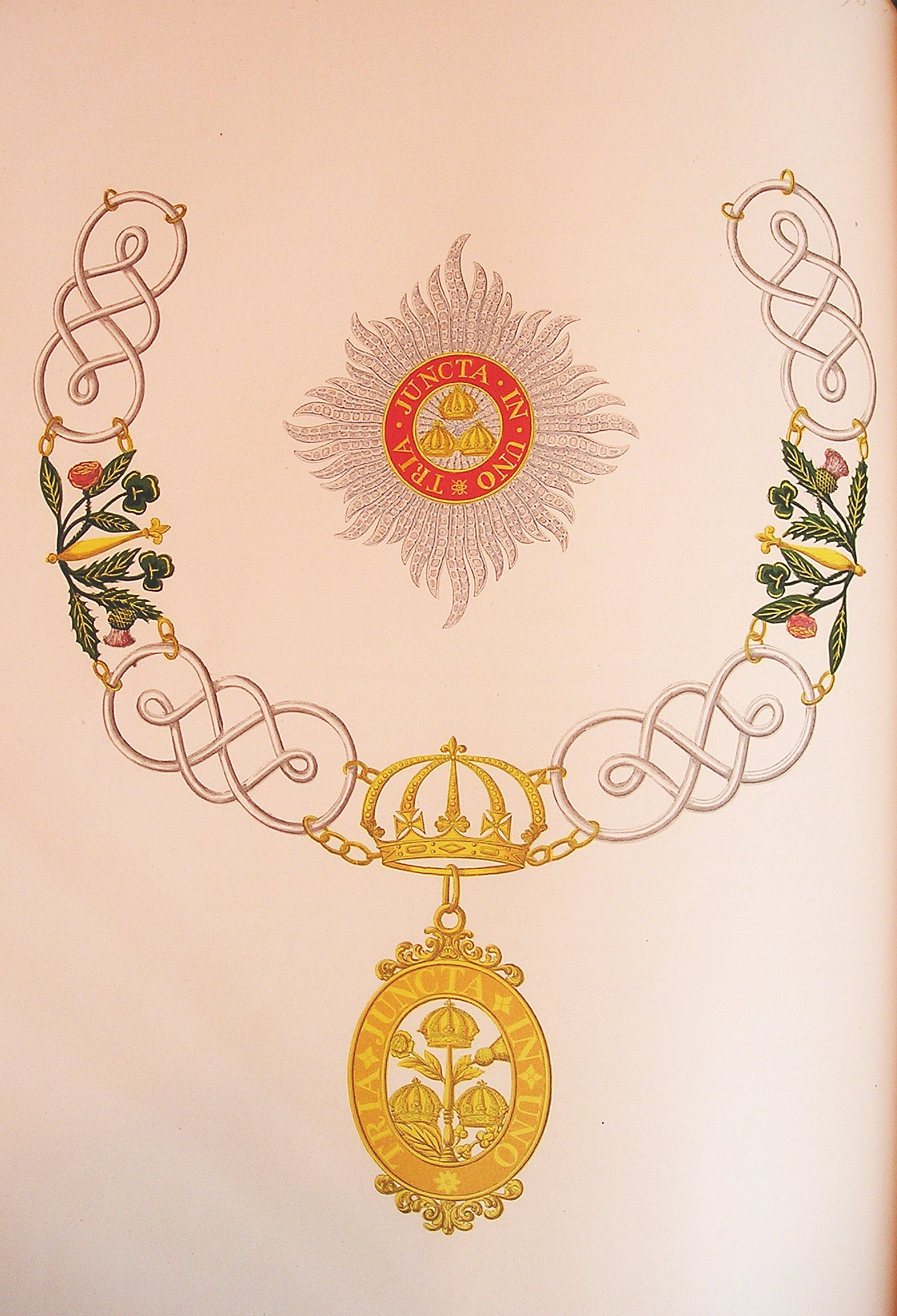
The insignia of a Knight Grand Cross of the civil division of the order

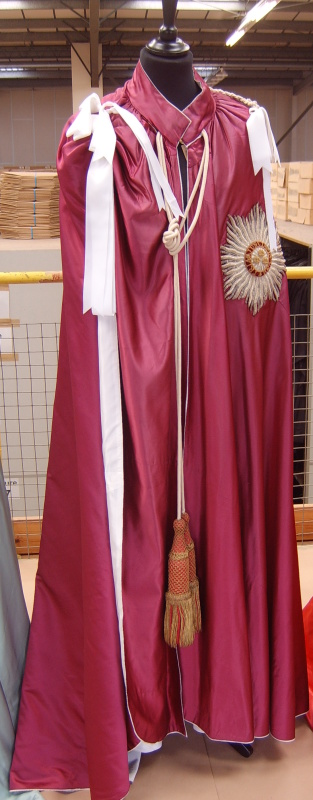
Mantle of the Order

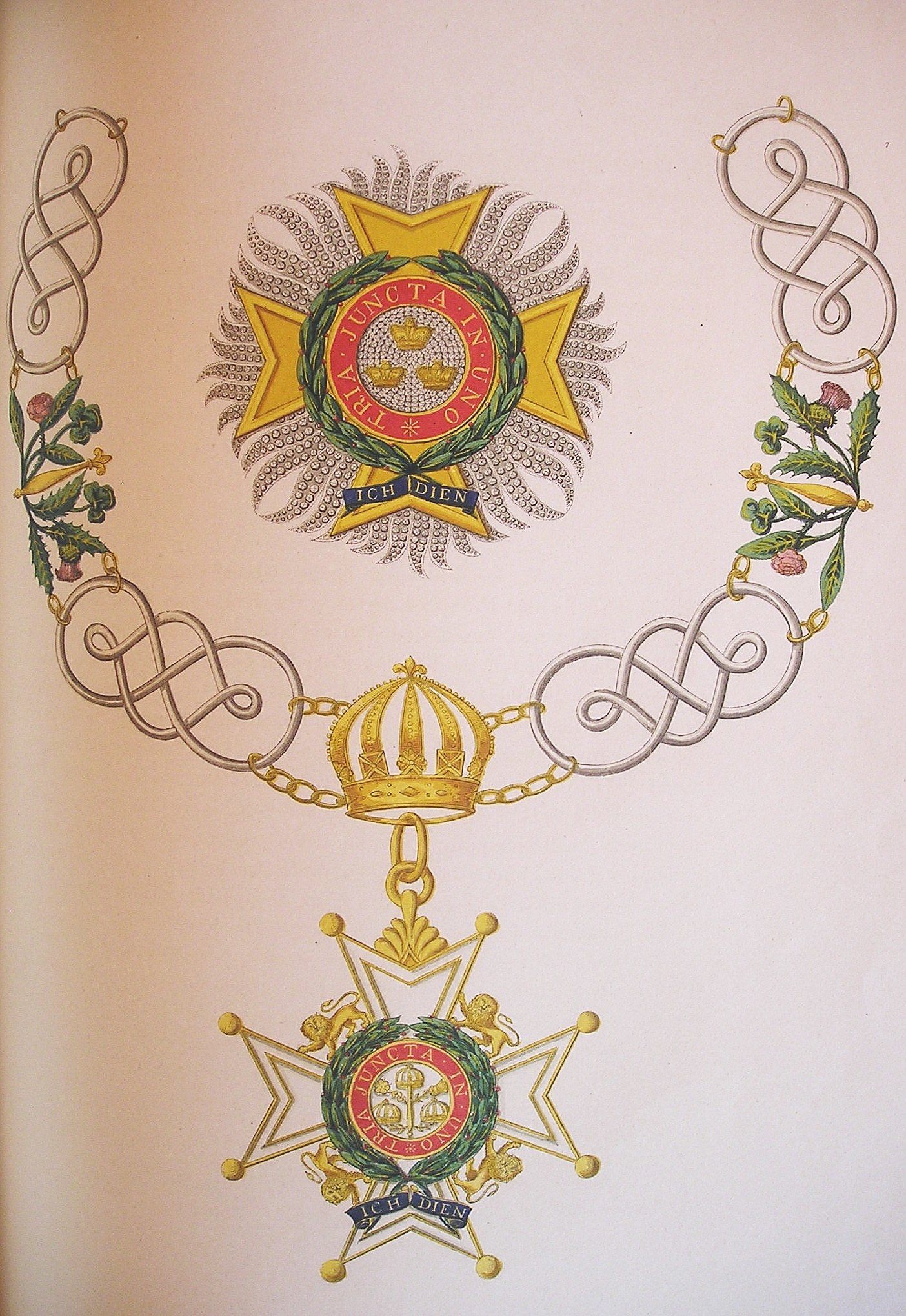
The insignia of a Knight Grand Cross of the military division of the order

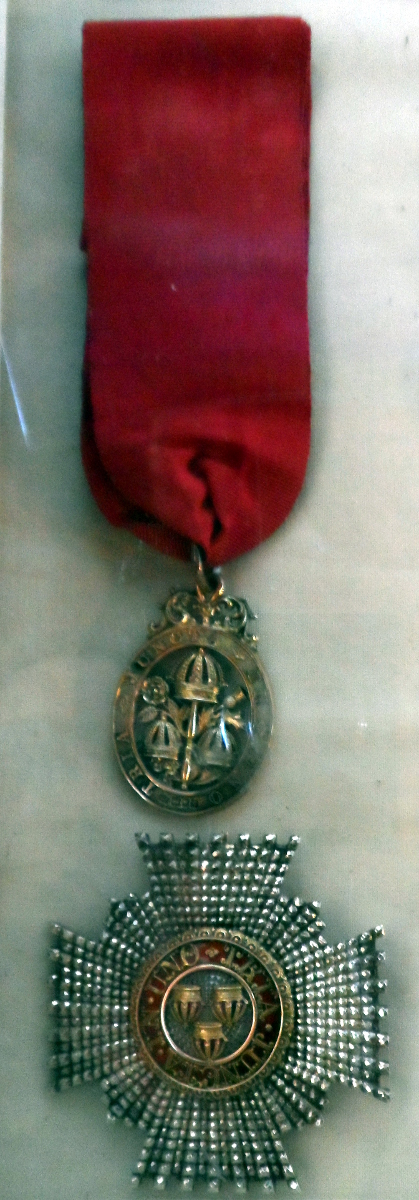
Star and neck badge of a Knight Commander of the civil division of the order

Members of the Order wear elaborate uniforms on important occasions (such as its quadrennial installation ceremonies and coronations), which vary by rank:

The mantle, worn only by Knights and Dames Grand Cross, is made of crimson satin lined with white taffeta. On the left side is a representation of the star (see below). The mantle is bound with two large tassels.

The hat, worn only by Knights and Dames Grand Cross and Knights and Dames Commander, is made of black velvet; it includes an upright plume of feathers.

The collar, worn only by Knights and Dames Grand Cross, is made of gold and weighs 30 troy ounces (933 g). It consists of depictions of nine imperial crowns and eight sets of flowers (roses for England, thistles for Scotland, and shamrocks for Ireland), connected by seventeen silver knots.

On lesser occasions, simpler insignia are used: The star is used only by Knights and Dames Grand Cross and Knights and Dames Commander. Its style varies by rank and division; it is worn pinned to the left breast:

The star for military Knights and Dames Grand Cross consists of a Maltese Cross on top of an eight-pointed silver star; the star for military Knights and Dames Commander is an eight-pointed silver cross pattée. Each bears in the centre three crowns surrounded by a red ring bearing the motto of the Order in gold letters. The circle is flanked by two laurel branches, and is above a scroll bearing the words Ich dien (older German for 'I serve') in gold letters. Stylised versions of this are known as Bath stars, and are used as epaulette pips to indicate army officer ranks and police ranks in the United Kingdom and Commonwealth countries.

The star for civil Knights and Dames Grand Cross consists of an eight-pointed silver star, without the Maltese cross; the star for civil Knights and Dames Commander is an eight-pointed silver cross pattée. The design of each is the same as the design of the military stars, except that the laurel branches and the words Ich dien are excluded.

The badge varies in design, size, and manner of wearing by rank and division. The Knight and Dame Grand Cross' badge is larger than the Knight and Dame Commander's badge, which is in turn larger than the Companion's badge; however, these are all suspended on a crimson ribbon. Knights and Dames Grand Cross wear the badge on a riband or sash, passing from the right shoulder to the left hip. Knights Commander and male Companions wear the badge from a ribbon worn around the neck. Dames Commander and female Companions wear the badge from a bow on the left side:

The military badge is a gold Maltese Cross of eight points, enamelled in white. Each point of the cross is decorated by a small gold ball; each angle has a small figure of a lion. The centre of the cross bears three crowns on the obverse side, and a rose, a thistle and a shamrock, emanating from a sceptre on the reverse side. Both emblems are surrounded by a red circular ring bearing the motto of the Order, which are in turn flanked by two laurel branches, above a scroll bearing the words Ich dien in gold letters.

The civil badge is a plain gold oval, bearing three crowns on the obverse side, and a rose, a thistle and a shamrock, emanating from a sceptre on the reverse side; both emblems are surrounded by a ring bearing the motto of the Order.

On certain 'collar days' designated by the Sovereign, members attending formal events may wear the Order's collar over their military uniform or evening wear. When collars are worn (either on collar days or on formal occasions such as coronations), the badge is suspended from the collar.

The collars and badges of Knights and Dames Grand Cross are returned to the Central Chancery of the Orders of Knighthood upon the decease of their owners. All other insignia may be retained by their owners.

Drawing of a Star, GCB Military Division

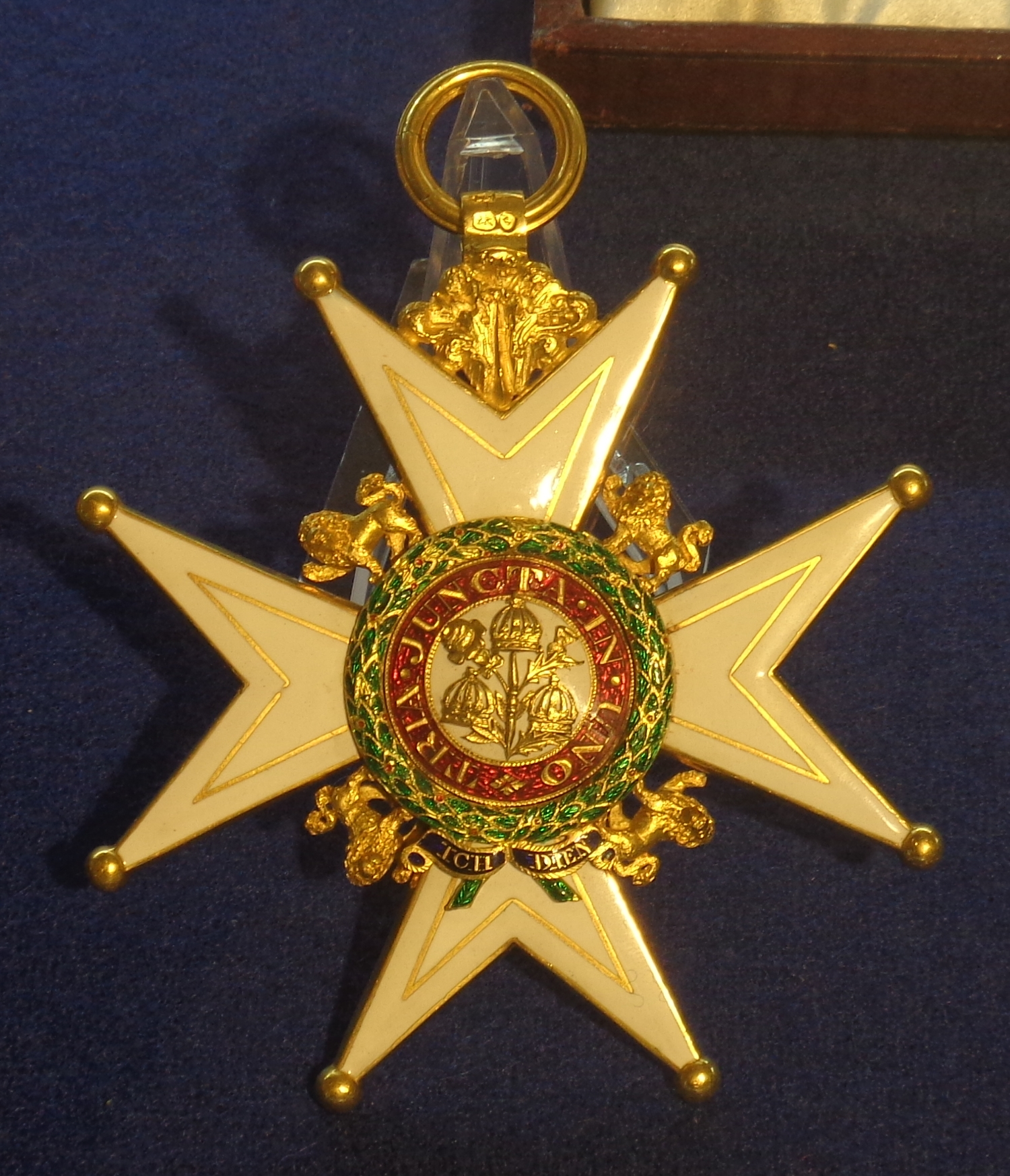
Badge, Knight Grand Cross Military Division

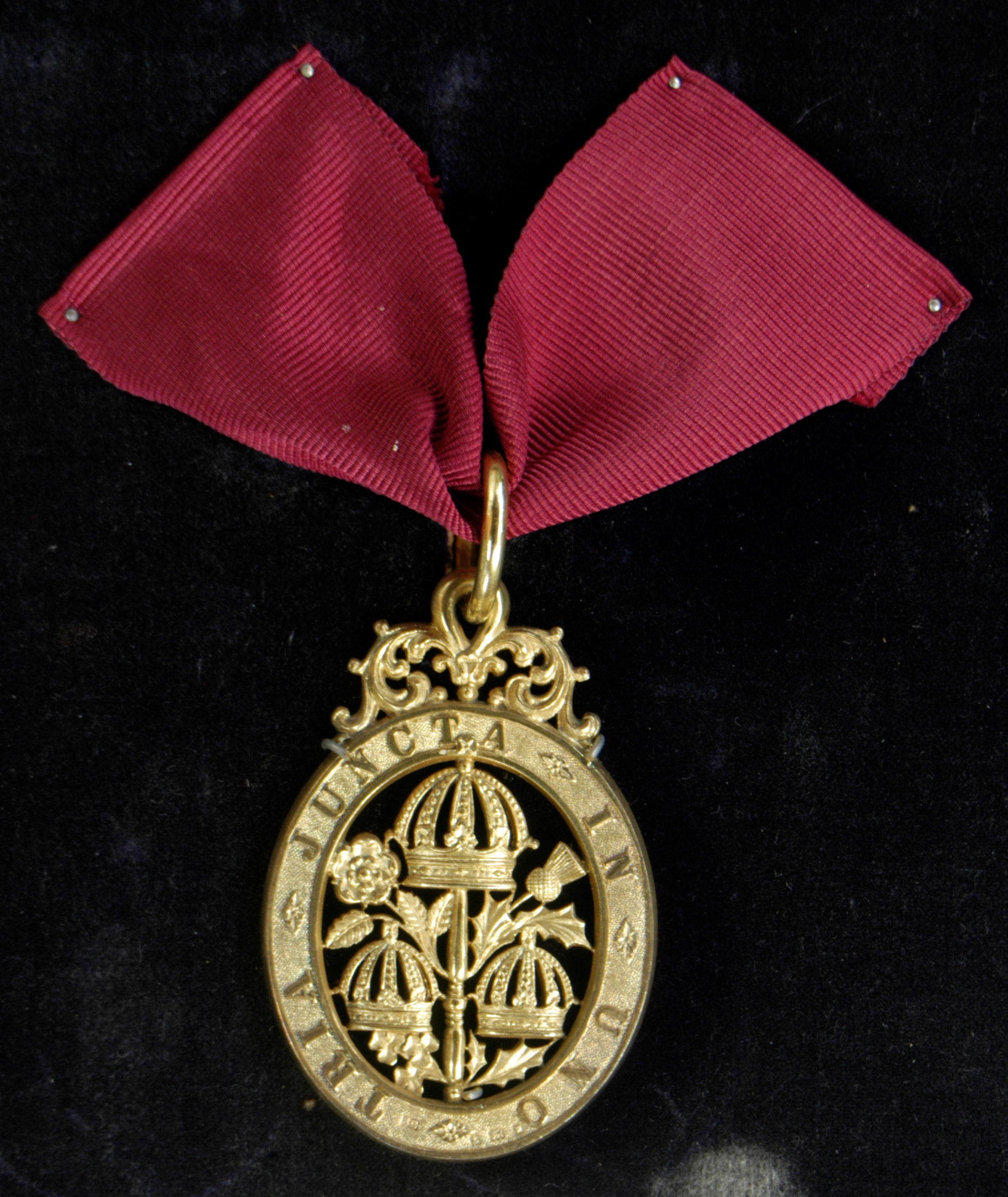
Neck badge issued to Cecil Fane de Salis (1859–1948) in 1935

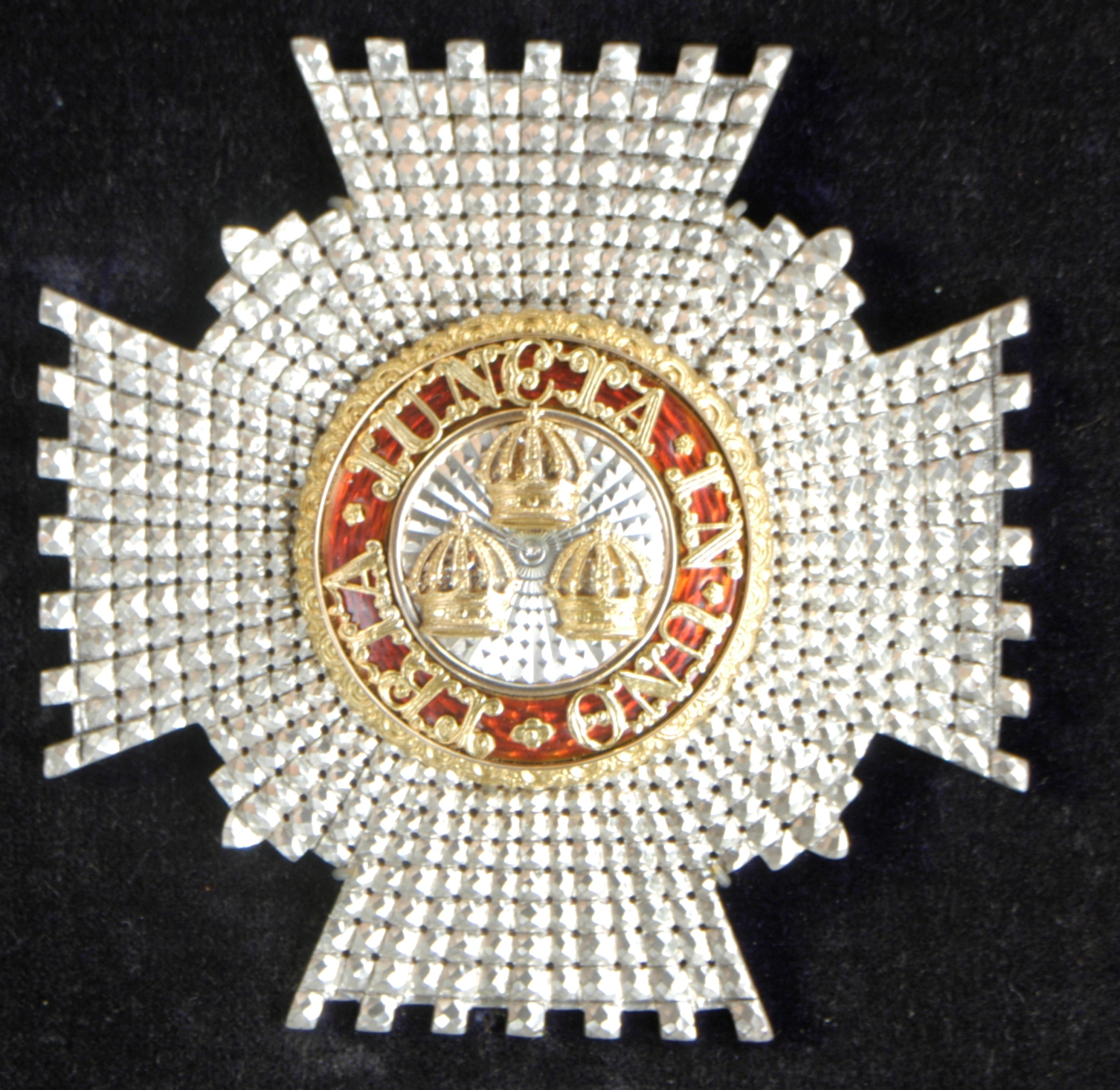
Star issued to Cecil Fane de Salis

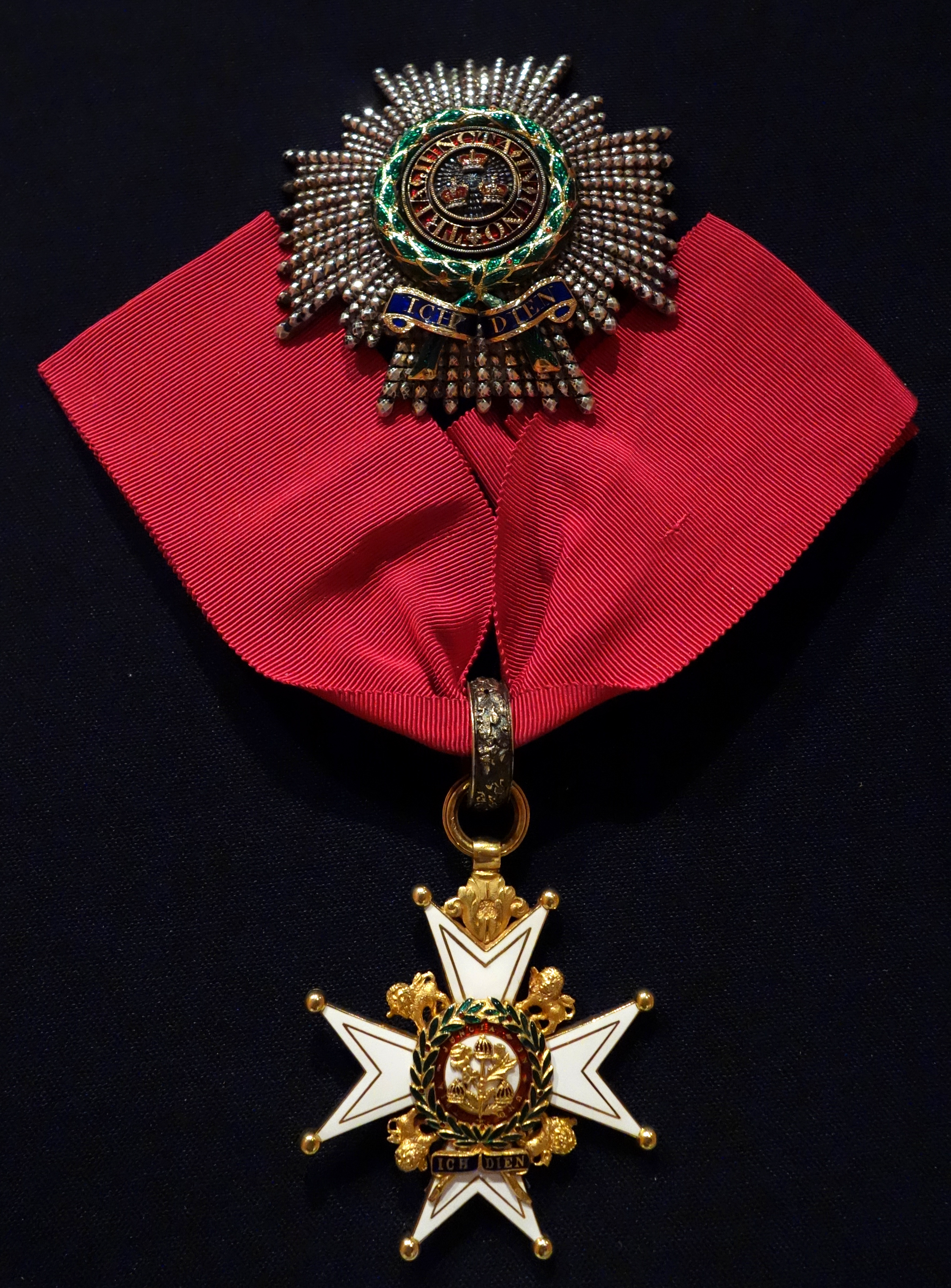
Star and neck Badge issued to Sir Charles Taylor du Plat

Medal Ribbon of the Order of the Bath

== Chapel ==
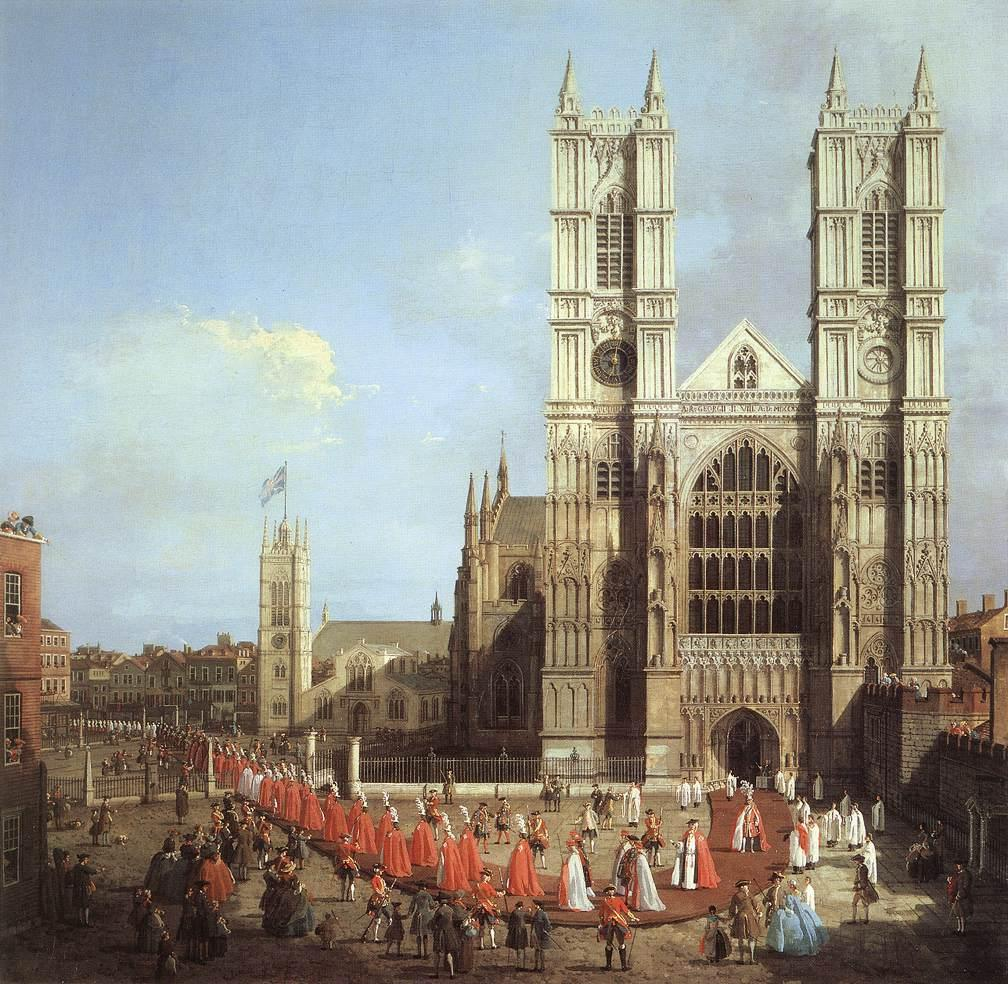
Westminster Abbey with a procession of Knights of the Bath, by Canaletto, 1749

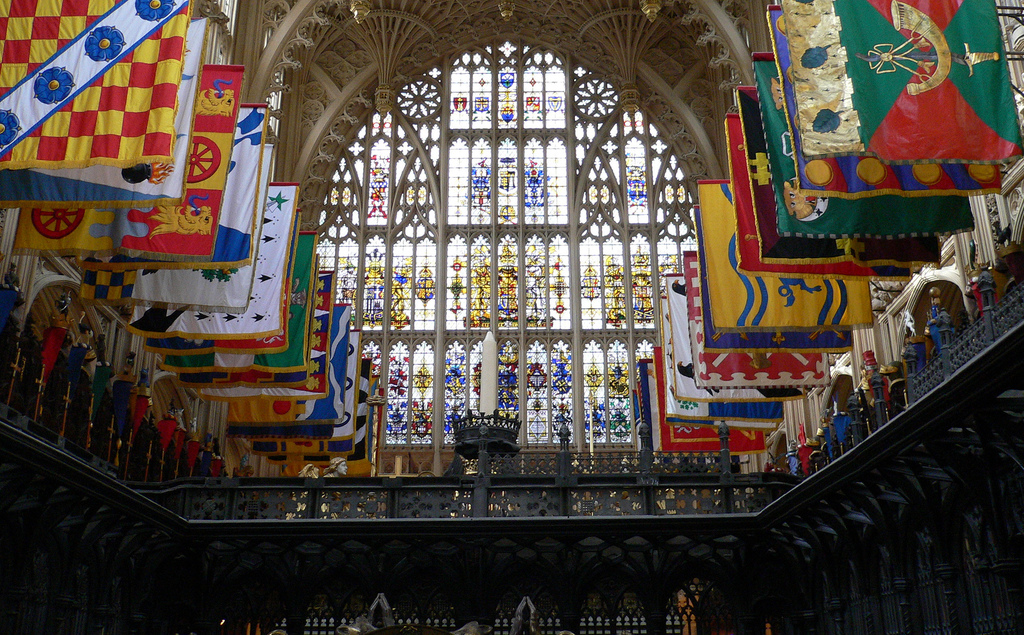
Banners of the senior Knights and Dames Grand Cross of the Order of the Bath in the Henry VII Lady Chapel in Westminster Abbey

The Chapel of the Order is the Henry VII Lady Chapel in Westminster Abbey. The Sovereign, Great Master, and the Knights and Dames Grand Cross are allotted stalls in the choir of the chapel, above which their heraldic devices are displayed.

Every four years, an installation ceremony, presided over by the Great Master, and a religious service are held in the chapel. The last such service was on Friday 16 May 2025, and was presided over by the King and the Prince of Wales. The Sovereign and each knight who has been installed is allotted a stall in the choir of the chapel.

As there are a limited number of stalls in the chapel, only the most senior Knights and Dames Grand Cross are installed. A stall made vacant by the death of a military Knight Grand Cross is offered to the next most senior uninstalled military GCB, and similarly for vacancies among civil GCBs. Waits between admission to the Order and installation may be very long; for instance, Marshal of the Air Force David Craig, Baron Craig of Radley was created a Knight Grand Cross in 1984, but was not installed until 2006.

Above each stall, the occupant's heraldic devices are displayed. Perched on the pinnacle of a knight's stall is his helm, decorated with a mantling and topped by his crest. Under English heraldic law, women other than monarchs do not bear helms or crests; instead, the coronet appropriate to the dame's rank (if she is a peer or member of the Royal family) is used.

Above the crest or coronet, the knight's or dame's heraldic banner is hung, emblazoned with his or her coat of arms. At a considerably smaller scale, to the back of the stall is affixed a piece of brass (a 'stall plate') displaying its occupant's name, arms, and date of admission into the Order.

Upon the death of a Knight, the banner, helm, mantling, and crest (or coronet or crown) are taken down. The stall plates, however, are not removed; rather, they remain permanently affixed somewhere about the stall, so that the stalls of the chapel are festooned with a colourful record of the Order's Knights (and now Dames) throughout history.

When the grade of Knight Commander was established in 1815, the regulations specified that they too should have a banner and stall plate affixed in the chapel. This was never implemented (despite some of the KCBs paying the appropriate fees) primarily due to lack of space, although the 1847 statutes allow all three classes to request the erection of a plate in the chapel bearing the member's name, date of nomination, and (for the two higher classes) optionally the coat of arms.

== Privileges ==
=== Precedence ===
Coat of arms of the Marquess of Carisbrooke (1886–1960) with the circlet and collar as Knight Grand Cross of the Order of the Bath.

Members of the Order of the Bath are assigned positions in the order of precedence. Wives of male members also feature on the order of precedence, as do sons, daughters, and daughters-in-law of Knights Grand Cross and Knights Commander; relatives of female members, however, are not assigned any special precedence. Generally, individuals can derive precedence from their fathers or husbands, but not from their mothers or wives. (See order of precedence in England and Wales for the exact positions.)

Knights Grand Cross and Knights Commander prefix 'Sir', and Dames Grand Cross and Dames Commander prefix 'Dame', to their forenames. Wives of Knights may prefix 'Lady' to their surnames, but no equivalent privilege exists for husbands of Dames. Such forms are not used by peers and princes, except when the names of the former are written out in their fullest forms. Furthermore, honorary foreign members and clergymen do not receive the accolade of knighthood, and so are not entitled to the prefix 'Sir', unless the former subsequently become citizens of a Commonwealth realm.

Knights and Dames Grand Cross use the post-nominal GCB; Knights Commander use KCB; Dames Commander use DCB; Companions use CB.

=== Heraldry ===
Knights and Dames Grand Cross are also entitled to receive heraldic supporters. Furthermore, they may encircle their arms with a depiction of the circlet (a red circle bearing the motto) with the badge pendant thereto and the collar; the former is shown either outside or on top of the latter.

Knights and Dames Commander and Companions may display the circlet, but not the collar, around their arms. The badge is depicted suspended from the collar or circlet. Members of the Military division may encompass the circlet with 'two laurel branches issuant from an escrol azure inscribed Ich dien', as appears on the badge.

Members of the Order of the Bath and their children are able to be married in Westminster Abbey in London.

== Revocation ==
It is possible for membership in the Order to be revoked. Under the 1725 statutes, the grounds for this were heresy, high treason, or fleeing from battle out of cowardice. Knights Companion could in such cases be degraded at the next Chapter meeting. It was then the duty of the Gentleman Usher to 'pluck down the escocheon [i.e. stallplate] of such knight and spurn it out of the chapel' with 'all the usual marks of infamy'.

Only two people were ever degraded: Lord Cochrane in 1813, and Eyre Coote in 1816, both for political reasons, rather than any of the grounds given in the statute. Lord Cochrane was subsequently reinstated, but Coote died a few years after his degradation.

Under Queen Victoria's 1847 statutes, a member 'convicted of treason, cowardice, felony, or any infamous crime derogatory to his honour as a knight or gentleman, or accused and does not submit to trial in a reasonable time, shall be degraded from the Order by a special ordinance signed by the sovereign.' The Sovereign was to be the sole judge, and also had the power to restore such members.

The situation today is that membership may be cancelled or annulled, and the entry in the register erased, by an ordinance signed by the Sovereign and sealed with the seal of the Order, on the recommendation of the appropriate minister. Such cancellations may be subsequently reversed.

In 1923, Prime Minister of Italy Benito Mussolini was made an honorary Knight Grand Cross, by King George V. Mussolini was stripped of his GCB in 1940, after he had declared war on the UK.

George Pottinger, a senior civil servant, lost both his status of CB and Commander of the Royal Victorian Order (CVO) in 1975 when he was jailed for corruptly receiving gifts from the architect John Poulson.

Romanian president Nicolae Ceaușescu was stripped of his honorary GCB status by Queen Elizabeth II on 24 December 1989, the day before his execution. Robert Mugabe, the President of Zimbabwe, was stripped of his honorary GCB status by Queen Elizabeth II, on the advice of the Foreign Secretary, David Miliband, on 25 June 2008, 'as a mark of revulsion at the abuse of human rights and abject disregard for the democratic process in Zimbabwe over which President Mugabe has presided.'

Vicky Pryce, former wife of Chris Huhne, was stripped of her CB by Queen Elizabeth II on 30 July 2013, following her conviction for perverting the course of justice.

== Current Knights and Dames Grand Cross ==
=== Sovereign and Great Master ===
Name	Year of appointment	Present age
Charles III (ex officio)	1974 as Great Master as The Prince of Wales; Sovereign since 2022	78
William, Prince of Wales KG, KT, GCB, PC, ADC	2024	44

=== Knights and Dames Grand Cross ===
Rank (if any)	Name	Known for	Year of appointment	Present age
Marshal of the Royal Air Force	David Craig, Baron Craig of Radley GCB, OBE	Air Officer Commanding-in-Chief, RAF Strike Command	1984	97
	Sir Clive Whitmore GCB, CVO	Permanent Under-Secretary of State for Defence and Principal Private Secretary to the Prime Minister	1988	91
	Sir Peter Middleton GCB	Permanent Secretary to the Treasury	1989	92
Air Chief Marshal	Sir Patrick Hine GCB, GBE	Joint Commander British Forces Gulf War	1989	94
	Sir Terence Heiser GCB	Permanent Secretary at the Department of the Environment	1992	94
Admiral	Sir Jock Slater GCB, LVO, DL	Commander-in-Chief Fleet	1992	88
	Robin Butler, Baron Butler of Brockwell KG, GCB, CVO, PC	Cabinet Secretary and Head of the Home Civil Service	1992	88
Air Chief Marshal	Sir Michael Graydon GCB, CBE	Chief of the Air Staff	1993	88
Air Chief Marshal	Sir Michael Alcock GCB, KBE, FREng, FIMechE, FRAeS	Air Officer Commander-in-Chief, RAF Logistics Command	1995	90
	Terence Burns, Baron Burns GCB	Permanent Secretary to the Treasury	1995	82
Air Chief Marshal	Sir Richard Johns GCB, KCVO, CBE	Chief of the Air Staff	1997	87
General	Sir Roger Wheeler GCB, CBE	Commander-in-Chief, Land Command	1997	84
Field Marshal	Michael Walker, Baron Walker of Aldringham GCB, CMG, CBE, DL	Commander-in-Chief, Land Command	1999	82
General	Sir Jeremy Mackenzie GCB, OBE, DL	Deputy Supreme Allied Commander Europe	1999	85
	Sir Nigel Wicks GCB, CVO, CBE	Second Permanent Secretary to the Treasury and Principal Private Secretary to the Prime Minister	1999	86
	Richard Wilson, Baron Wilson of Dinton GCB	Cabinet Secretary and Head of the Home Civil Service	2001	84
Admiral	Sir Nigel Essenhigh GCB, DL	First Sea Lord and Chief of the Naval Staff and Commander-in-Chief Fleet	2002	82
	Sir David Omand GCB	Director of the Government Communications Headquarters	2004	79
Admiral	Alan West, Baron West of Spithead GCB, DSC, PC	First Sea Lord and Chief of the Naval Staff	2004	78
Marshal of the Royal Air Force	Graham Eric Stirrup, Baron Stirrup KG, GCB, AFC, FRAeS, FCMI	Chief of the Air Staff	2005	76
	Sir Richard Mottram GCB	Permanent Secretary for Intelligence, Security and Resilience	2006	80
	Robin Janvrin, Baron Janvrin GCB, GCVO, QSO, PC	Private Secretary to the Sovereign	2007	80
General	Richard Dannatt, Baron Dannatt GCB, CBE, MC, DL	Chief of the General Staff	2008	75
Air Chief Marshal	Sir Glenn Torpy GCB, CBE, DSO	Chief of the Air Staff	2008	73
Admiral	Sir Jonathon Band GCB, DL	First Sea Lord and Chief of the Naval Staff and Commander-in-Chief Fleet	2008	76
Admiral	Sir Mark Stanhope GCB, OBE, DL	First Sea Lord and Chief of the Naval Staff, Commander-in-Chief Fleet and Vice-Admiral of the United Kingdom	2010	74
Field Marshal	Nick Houghton, Baron Houghton of Richmond GCB, CBE, DL	Chief of the Defence Staff and Chief of Joint Operations	2011	72
	Sir David Normington GCB	Permanent Under-Secretary of State of the Home Office and Permanent Secretary at the Department for Education and Skills	2011	75
Field Marshal	David Richards, Baron Richards of Herstmonceux GCB, CBE, DSO, DL	Chief of the Defence Staff and Chief of the General Staff	2011	74
	Gus O'Donnell, Baron O'Donnell KG, GCB, FBA, FAcSS	Cabinet Secretary and Head of the Home Civil Service	2011	74
Air Chief Marshal	Sir Stephen Dalton GCB, FRAeS	Chief of the Air Staff	2012	72
General	Sir Peter Wall GCB, CBE, DL	Chief of the General Staff and Commander-in-Chief, Land Forces	2013	71
	Nicholas Macpherson, Baron Macpherson of Earl's Court GCB	Permanent Secretary to the Treasury	2015	67
Admiral	Sir George Zambellas GCB, DSC, ADC, DL, FRAeS	First Sea Lord and Chief of the Naval Staff and Fleet Commander	2016	68
Air Chief Marshal	Sir Andrew Pulford GCB, CBE	Chief of the Air Staff	2016	68
	Christopher Geidt, Baron Geidt GCB, GCVO, OBE, QSO, PC, FKC	Private Secretary to the Sovereign	2018	65
General	Sir Nicholas Carter GCB, CBE, DSO	Chief of the Defence Staff and Chief of the General Staff	2019	67
	Dame Sally Davies GCB, DBE, FRS, FMedSci	Master of Trinity College, Cambridge and Chief Medical Officer for England	2019	76
Admiral	Sir Philip Jones GCB, DL	First Sea Lord and Chief of the Naval Staff	2020	66
Air Chief Marshal	Sir Stephen Hillier GCB, CBE, DFC	Chief of the Air Staff	2020	63–64
	Sir Tom Scholar GCB	Permanent Secretary to the Treasury	2023	57
	Edward Young, Baron Young of Old Windsor GCB, GCVO, PC	Private Secretary to the Sovereign	2023	60
General	Sir Mark Carleton-Smith GCB, CBE, DL	Chief of the General Staff and Director Special Forces	2023	62

=== Honorary Knights and Dames Grand Cross ===
Country	Name	Office when appointed	Year of appointment	Present age	Notes
Portugal	António Ramalho Eanes GCB	President of Portugal	1978	91	Recipient of the Royal Victorian Chain; on the occasion of his state visit to the United Kingdom
Nigeria	Ibrahim Babangida GCB	President of Nigeria	1989	85	On the occasion of his state visit to the United Kingdom
Iceland	Vigdís Finnbogadóttir GCB, GCMG	President of Iceland	1990	96	On the occasion of the state visit by Elizabeth II to Iceland
Poland	Lech Wałęsa GCB	President of Poland	1991	83	On the occasion of his state visit to the United Kingdom
Brunei	Hassanal Bolkiah GCB, GCMG	Sultan of Brunei	1992	80	In both the Military and Civil Divisions; also Honorary Admiral in the Royal Navy, Honorary General in the British Army and Honorary Air Chief Marshal in the Royal Air Force; on the occasion of his state visit to the United Kingdom
Poland	Aleksander Kwaśniewski GCB, GCMG	President of Poland	1996	72	On the occasion of the state visit by Elizabeth II to Poland
Brazil	Fernando Henrique Cardoso GCB	President of Brazil	1997	95	On the occasion of his state visit to the United Kingdom
Jordan	Abdullah II of Jordan GCB, GCMG, GCVO	King of Jordan	2001	64	Colonel-in-Chief of the Light Dragoons; on the occasion of his state visit to the United Kingdom
South Africa	Thabo Mbeki GCB, GCMG, KStJ	President of South Africa	2001	84	On the occasion of his state visit to the United Kingdom
Nigeria	Olusegun Obasanjo GCB	President of Nigeria	2003	89	On the occasion of the Commonwealth visit by Elizabeth II to Nigeria
Malta	Eddie Fenech Adami GCB	President of Malta	2005	92	On the occasion of the Commonwealth visit by Elizabeth II to Malta
Brazil	Luiz Inácio Lula da Silva GCB	President of Brazil	2006	81	On the occasion of his state visit to the United Kingdom
Lithuania	Valdas Adamkus GCB	President of Lithuania	2006	100	On the occasion of the state visit by Elizabeth II to Lithuania
Latvia	Vaira Vīķe-Freiberga GCB, OC, OQ	President of Latvia	2006	88	On the occasion of the state visit by Elizabeth II to Latvia
Estonia	Toomas Hendrik Ilves GCB	President of Estonia	2006	72	On the occasion of the state visit by Elizabeth II to Estonia
Ghana	John Kufuor GCB	President of Ghana	2007	87	On the occasion of his state visit to the United Kingdom
Turkey	Abdullah Gül GCB	President of Turkey	2008	77	On the occasion of the state visit by Elizabeth II to Turkey
France	Nicolas Sarkozy GCB	President of France	2008	71	On the occasion of his state visit to the United Kingdom
Slovenia	Danilo Türk GCB	President of Slovenia	2008	74	On the occasion of the state visit by Elizabeth II to Slovenia
Mexico	Felipe Calderón GCB	President of Mexico	2009	64	On the occasion of his state visit to the United Kingdom
South Africa	Jacob Zuma GCB	President of South Africa	2010	84	On the occasion of his state visit to the United Kingdom
Indonesia	Susilo Bambang Yudhoyono GCB, GCL, AC	President of Indonesia	2012	77	On the occasion of his state visit to the United Kingdom
South Korea	Park Geun-hye GCB	President of South Korea	2013	74	On the occasion of her state visit to the United Kingdom
France	François Hollande GCB, OQ	President of France	2014	72	On the occasion of the state visit by Elizabeth II to France
Singapore	Tony Tan GCB	President of Singapore	2014	86	On the occasion of his state visit to the United Kingdom
Mexico	Enrique Peña Nieto GCB	President of Mexico	2015	60	On the occasion of his state visit to the United Kingdom
Germany	Joachim Gauck GCB	President of Germany	2015	86	On the occasion of the state visit by Elizabeth II to Germany
Colombia	Juan Manuel Santos GCB	President of Colombia	2016	75	On the occasion of his state visit to the United Kingdom
South Africa	Cyril Ramaphosa GCB	President of South Africa	2022	74	On the occasion of his state visit to the United Kingdom
Germany	Frank-Walter Steinmeier GCB	President of Germany	2023	70	On the occasion of the State visit by Charles III to Germany
France	Emmanuel Macron GCB, CBE	President of France	2023	48	On the occasion of the State visit by Charles III to France
South Korea	Yoon Suk Yeol GCB	President of South Korea	2023	65	On the occasion of his state visit to the United Kingdom
Qatar	Tamim bin Hamad Al Thani GCB	Emir of Qatar	2024	46	On the occasion of his state visit to the United Kingdom
Italy	Sergio Mattarella GCB, KBE	President of Italy	2025	85	On the occasion of the state visit by Charles III to Italy
Holy See	Leo XIV GCB	Pope	2025	71	On the occasion of the state visit by Charles III to the Holy See
Oman	Haitham bin Tariq GCB, GCMG, GCVO	Sultan of Oman	2026	71	On the occasion of his state visit to the United Kingdom

=== Officers ===
Coat of arms of the Air Chief Marshal Sir Peter Squire, Knight Grand Cross of the Order of the Bath

The Order of the Bath now has six officers:

- Dean: Dean of Westminster (ex officio), the Very Rev. David Hoyle KCVO, MBE
- King of Arms: Air Chief Marshal Sir Stephen Dalton GCB, FRAeS
- Registrar and Secretary: Major General James Gordon CB, CBE
- Deputy Secretary: Lieutenant Colonel Stephen Segrave
- Genealogist: James Peill, Garter Principal King of Arms
- Lady Usher of the Scarlet Rod: Major General Susan Ridge CB

== See also ==
For people who have been appointed to the Order of the Bath, see the following categories:

- Category: Knights Grand Cross of the Order of the Bath
- Category: Dames Grand Cross of the Order of the Bath
- Category: Knights Commander of the Order of the Bath
- Category: Dames Commander of the Order of the Bath
- Category: Knights Companion of the Order of the Bath
- List of knights and dames grand cross of the Order of the Bath
- List of knights companion of the Order of the Bath
- Category: Knights of the Bath
- Category: Companions of the Order of the Bath
- List of honorary British knights and dames
- List of people who have declined a British honour
- List of revocations of appointments to orders and awarded decorations and medals of the United Kingdom
- Ablution in Christianity
