= Ebury =

Ebury may refer to:

- Part of Eia, a medieval manor in Westminster, London
- Baron Ebury, a title in the UK Peerage
- Ebury Publishing, a British publisher
- A ward in Westminster, London; see 1964 Westminster City Council election
