= Baron Grey de Wilton =

Barony in the Peerage of Great Britain

Arms of Reginald de Grey, 1st Baron Grey de Wilton

Baron Grey de Wilton is a title that has been created twice, once in the Peerage of England (1295) and once in the Peerage of Great Britain (1784). The first creation was forfeit and the second creation is extinct.

== History ==
=== First creation ===
The first creation was generally dated to 23 June 1295, when Reginald de Grey was summoned to an assembly prior to the Model Parliament that was summoned that November, as Lord Grey de Wilton. Burke's Peerage notes that the June "assembly in question is not now recognized as a bona fide Parl[iament]", but that Reginald had earlier been summoned to the "assembly called a full Parl[iament] of 29 May 1290". This branch of the Grey family of aristocrats was based at Wilton Castle on the Welsh border in Herefordshire. The Greys of Wilton, as well as the other old noble families bearing the name of Grey/Gray, are descended from the Norman knight Anchetil de Greye. Wilton Castle itself passed from the family when the 13th baron was forced to sell it to raise his ransom after being captured in France. Sir Thomas Grey, the 15th baron, was attainted in 1603, forfeiting his titles and honours, after being convicted of treason for his alleged involvement in the Bye Plot against King James I. Grey never married. The attainder against him was not reversed prior to his death. His two sisters would have been his co-heiresses but for the attainder; one of them, Bridget, married Sir Roland Egerton, 1st Baronet, and they were ancestors of the recipient of the second creation below.

=== Second creation ===
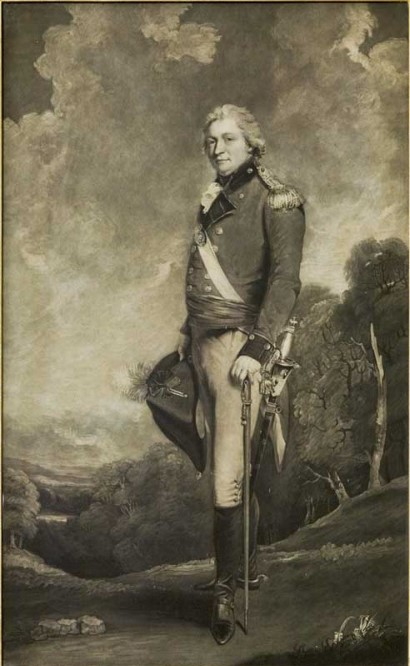
Thomas Egerton, who became Baron Grey de Wilton in 1784, then Viscount Grey de Wilton and Earl of Wilton in 1801

The second creation was in 1784, when Sir Thomas Egerton (1749–1814) was created Baron Grey de Wilton, of Wilton Castle, with remainder to the heirs male of his body. He was a member of the Egerton family and had in 1756 succeeded to his father's Grey Egerton baronetcy. The 1st baronet had married Bridget Grey, the sister of Sir Thomas Grey. In 1801, the 1st Baron Grey de Wilton was also made Viscount Grey de Wilton and Earl of Wilton, of Wilton Castle in the County of Hereford, in the Peerage of the United Kingdom. The latter titles were created with remainder to the second and younger sons successively of his daughter Eleanor, wife of Robert Grosvenor, 1st Marquess of Westminster.

On the first earl of Wilton's death in 1804, the Grey de Wilton barony became extinct, as he had no sons, while the Grey Egerton baronetcy passed to a distant relative. The titles of Earl of Wilton and Viscount Grey de Wilton passed, according to the special remainder, to the 1st earl's grandson, Thomas Grosvenor (1799–1882), who adopted the surname of Egerton and became the 2nd earl. These titles are still extant.

== Grey family ==
=== Ancestors ===
- Henry de Grey was granted the manor of Grays Thurrock, Essex in 1195 and had six sons.
- Sir John de Grey, father of the 1st baron Grey of Wilton

=== Barons Grey de Wilton (1295) ===
- Reginald de Grey, 1st Baron Grey de Wilton (d. 1308)
- John Grey, 2nd Baron Grey de Wilton (1268–1323)
- Henry Grey, 3rd Baron Grey de Wilton (1282–1342)
- Reginald Grey, 4th Baron Grey de Wilton (1312–1370) married Maud Bourtetourt, said to have been the daughter of Sir John de Bourtetourt.
- Henry Grey, 5th Baron Grey de Wilton (1342–1396), son of Reginald Grey and Maud, married Elizabeth Talbot, daughter of Gilbert Talbot and Petronilla Butler. They had a daughter, Margaret Grey (d. 1 June 1454), who married Sir John Darcy, 5th Lord Darcy of Knayth, 4th Lord Meinell
- Richard Grey, 6th Baron Grey de Wilton (1393–1442)
- Reginald Grey, 7th Baron Grey de Wilton (1421–1493)
- John Grey, 8th Baron Grey de Wilton (d. 1498)
- Edmund Grey, 9th Baron Grey de Wilton (d. 1511)
- George Grey, 10th Baron Grey de Wilton (d. 1515) succeeded his father Edmund but died before reaching majority.
- Thomas Grey, 11th Baron Grey de Wilton (1497–1518) succeeded his brother George but died before reaching majority.
- Richard Grey, 12th Baron Grey de Wilton (1507–1520) succeeded his brother Thomas but died before reaching majority.
- William Grey, 13th Baron Grey de Wilton (d. 1562) succeeded his brother Richard
- Arthur Grey, 14th Baron Grey de Wilton (1536–1593)
- Thomas Grey, 15th Baron Grey de Wilton (1575–1614) Title attainted 1603; extinct 1614.

== Egerton family ==
=== Barons Grey de Wilton (1784) ===
- Thomas Egerton, 1st Baron Grey de Wilton (1749–1814) (created Earl of Wilton in 1801)

succeeded as Earl of Wilton according to the special remainder by his grandson, Thomas Grosvenor (1799–1882)

see Earl of Wilton

== Family tree ==
Grosvenor and Grey family tree: Dukes of Westminster, Marquesses of Westminster
Earls: Grosvenor, Sussex (5th creation), and of Wilton
Viscounts: Belgrave, Grey de Wilton, and de Longueville and
Barons: Grey de Wilton, Grey of Ruthin (Ruthyn), Grey de Radcliffe, Ebury, Grosvenor, and Stalbridge

Baron Grey de Wilton (1st creation), 1285
Reginald Grey d. 1308; 1st Baron Grey de Wilton
John Grey c. 1268–1323; 2nd Baron Grey de Wilton
Baron Grey of Ruthin, 1324
Henry Grey; 1281–1342; 3rd Baron Grey de Wilton	Roger Grey d. 1352/1353; 1st Baron Grey of Ruthin	King Edward III; 1312–1377
Reynold Grey; 1311–1370; 4th Baron Grey de Wilton	Reynold Grey c. 1322 – c. 1388; 2nd Baron Grey of Ruthin	John of Gaunt; 1340–1399	Thomas Holland; Earl of Kent c. 1314–1360
Henry Grey c. 1340–1396; 5th Baron Grey de Wilton	Reynold Grey c. 1362 – c. 1440; 3rd Baron Grey of Ruthin	Elizabeth of Lancaster bef. 1363–1426	John Holland; Earl of Huntingdon; Duke of Exeter c. 1352–1400
Richard Grey c. 1393–1442; 6th Baron Grey de Wilton	John Grey c. 1387–1439	Constance Holland; 1387–1437
Reynold Grey c. 1421–1493/94; 7th Baron Grey de Wilton	Edmund Grey c. 1362 – c. 1440; 1st Earl of Kent, 4th Baron Grey of Ruthin	See Template:Dukes of Kent family tree
Edmund Grey d. 1499; 8th Baron Grey de Wilton	George Grey; 2nd Earl of Kent, 5th Baron Grey of Ruthin c. 1460–1503
Edmund Grey c. 1469–1511; 9th Baron Grey de Wilton	Richard Grey; 3rd Earl of Kent, 6th Baron Grey of Ruthin; 1481–1524	Henry Grey; 4th Earl of Kent, 7th Baron Grey of Ruthin c. 1495–1562
George Grey c. 1493–1514/1515; 10th Baron Grey de Wilton	Thomas Grey c. 1496–1517; 11th Baron Grey de Wilton	Richard Grey c. 1505–1523; 12th Baron Grey de Wilton	William Grey c. 1509–1562; 13th Baron Grey de Wilton	Henry Grey; 1520–1545
Arthur Grey; 1536–1593; 14th Baron Grey de Wilton	Reginald Grey d. 1573; 5th Earl of Kent, 8th Baron Grey of Ruthin	Henry Grey; 1541–1615; 6th Earl of Kent, 9th Baron Grey of Ruthin	Charles Grey c. 1545–1623; 7th Earl of Kent, 10th Baron Grey of Ruthyn
Bridget Grey d. 1648	Thomas Grey; 1575–1614; 15th Baron Grey de Wilton	Susan Grey	Henry Grey c. 1583–1639; 8th Earl of Kent, 11th Baron Grey of Ruthyn
Barony Grey de Wilton (1st creation) extinct, 1614
Baronet of Egerton and Oulton, 1617
Roland Egerton d. 1646; 1st Baronet	Charles Longueville; 1612–1643; 12th Baron Grey de Ruthyn
John Egerton d. 1674; 2nd Baronet	Susan Longueville d. 1676; 13th Baroness Grey de Ruthyn suo jure
Viscount Longueville (1st creation), 1690
John Egerton d. 1729; 3rd Baronet	Charles Yelverton; 1657–1679; 14th Baron Grey de Ruthyn	Henry Yelverton c. 1664–1703/1704; 1st Viscount Longueville, 15th Baron Grey de Ruthyn
Earl of Sussex (5th creation), 1717
Holland Egerton c. 1689–1730; 4th Baronet	Talbot Yelverton c. 1664–1703/1704; 1st Earl of Sussex, 2nd Viscount Longueville, 16th Baron Grey de Ruthyn
Edward Egerton bef. 1721–1743/1744; 5th Baronet	Thomas Grey Egerton c. 1721–1756; 6th Baronet	George Augustus Yelverton; 1727–1758; 2nd Earl of Sussex, 3rd Viscount de Longueville, 17th Baron Grey de Ruthyn	Henry Yelverton; 1728–1799; 3rd Earl of Sussex, 4th Viscount de Longueville, 18th Baron Grey de Ruthyn
Earldom of Sussex (5th creation) and Viscountcy de Longueville (1st creation) extinct, 1799
Baron Grosvenor of Eaton in the County of Chester, 1761 Earl Gosvenor and Viscount Belgrave of Belgrave in the County of Chester, 1784	Baron Grey de Wilton (2nd creation), 1784 Earl of Wilton and Viscount Grey de Wilton, 1801
Richard Grosvenor; 1731–1802; 7th Baronet of Eaton, 1st Earl Grosvenor, etc.	Thomas Egerton; 1749–1814; 7th Baronet of Egerton and Oulton, 1st Earl of Wilton, etc.	Barbara Yelverton d. 1781
Barony Grey de Wilton (2nd creation) extinct, 1784
Marquess of Westminster, 1831
Robert Grosvenor; 1767–1845; 1st Marquess of Westminster, 2nd Earl Grosvenor, etc.	Eleanor Egerton; 1770–1846	Henry Yelverton; 1780–1810; 19th Baron Grey de Ruthyn
Baron Ebury of Ebury Manor in the County of Middlesex, 1857
Richard Grosvenor; 1795–1869; 2nd Marquess of Westminster, 3rd Earl Grosvenor, etc.	Thomas Grosvenor (Egerton); 1799–1882; 2nd Earl of Wilton, etc.	Robert Grosvenor; 1801–1893; 1st Baron Ebury	Barbara Rawdon-Hastings; 1810–1858; 20th Baroness Grey de Ruthyn suo jure	George Augustus Francis Rawdon-Hastings; 1808–1844; Marquess of Hastings
Duke of Westminster, 1874	Baron Stalbridge of Stalbridge in the County of Dorset, 1886	Baron Grey de Radcliffe in the County Palatine of Lancaster, 1875	Barony Grey de Ruthin (Ruthyn) abeyance terminated, 1885
Hugh Lupus Grosvenor; 1825–1899; 1st Duke of Westminster, 3rd Marquess of Westminster, 4th Earl Grosvenor, etc.	Richard de Aquila Grosvenor; 1837–1912; 1st Baron Stalbridge	Arthur Edward Holland Grey Egerton; 1833–1885; 3rd Earl of Wilton and Viscount Grey de Wilton, Baron Grey de Radcliffe	Seymour John Grey Egerton; 1839–1898; 4th Earl of Wilton, etc.	Robert Wellesley Grosvenor; 1834–1918; 2nd Baron Ebury	Bertha Lelgarde Clifton; 1835–1887; 22nd Baroness Grey de Ruthyn suo jure	Henry Weysford Charles Plantagenet Rawdon-Hastings; 1842–1868; Marquess of Hastings, Earl of Loudoun, 21st Baron Grey de Ruthyn, Baron Botreaux, Baron Hungerford, Baron de Moleyns, Baron Hastings
Barony Grey de Radcliffe extinct, 1885	Barony Grey de Ruthyn abeyant, 1868
Victor Alexander Grosvenor; 1853–1884 styled Earl Grosvenor	Henry George Grosvenor; 1861–1914	Hugh Grosvenor; 1880–1949; 2nd Baron Stalbridge	Arthur George Egerton; 1863–1915; 5th Earl of Wilton, etc.	Robert Victor Grosvenor; 1868–1921; 3rd Baron Ebury	Ella Cicely Mary Clifton; 1856–1912	Rawdon George Grey Clifton; 1858–1912; 23rd Baron Grey de Ruthyn	Cecil Talbot Clifton; 1862–1934; 24th Baron Grey de Ruthyn
Barony Stalbridge extinct, 1949	Barony Grey de Ruthyn abeyant, 1934
Barony Grey de Ruthyn abeyance terminated, 1940
Hugh Richard Arthur Grosvenor; 1879–1953; 2nd Duke of Westminster, 4th Marquess of Westminster, 5th Earl Grosvenor, etc.	William Grosvenor; 1894–1963; 3rd Duke of Westminster, 5th Marquess of Westminster, 6th Earl Grosvenor, etc.	Hugh William Grosvenor; 1884–1914	Seymour Edward Frederick Egerton; 1896–1927; 6th Earl of Wilton, etc.	Francis Egerton Grosvenor; 1883–1932; 4th Baron Ebury	John Lancelot Wykeham Butler-Bowden; 1883–1963; 25th Baron Grey de Ruthyn
Barony Grey de Ruthyn abeyant, 1963
Gerald Hugh Grosvenor; 1907–1967; 4th Duke of Westminster, 6th Marquess of Westminster, 7th Earl Grosvenor, etc.	Robert George Grosvenor; 1910–1979; 5th Duke of Westminster, 7th Marquess of Westminster, 8th Earl Grosvenor, etc.	Seymour William Arthur John Egerton; 1921–1999; 7th Earl of Wilton, etc.	Robert Grosvenor; 1914–1957; 5th Baron Ebury
Francis Grosvenor b. 1934; 8th Earl of Wilton and Viscount Grey de Wilton, 6th Baron Ebury and heir presumptive to the Marquessate of Westminster
Gerald Cavendish Grosvenor; 1951–2016; 6th Duke of Westminster, 8th Marquess of Westminster, 9th Earl Grosvenor, etc.	Julian Grosvenor b. 1959 styled Viscount Grey de Wilton
Heir apparent to the Earldom of Wilton
Hugh Grosvenor b. 1991; 7th Duke of Westminster, 9th Marquess of Westminster, 10th Earl Grosvenor, etc.
Cosima Florence Grosvenor b. 2025
Heir presumptive to the Dukedom of Westminster
