= Baron Grey of Ruthin =

Arms of Grey de Ruthyn: Barry of six Argent and Azure in chief three Torteaux

Baron Grey of Ruthin (or Ruthyn) was a noble title created in the Peerage of England by writ of summons in 1324 for Sir Roger de Grey, a son of John, 2nd Baron Grey of Wilton, and has been in abeyance since 1963. Historically, this branch of the Grey family was seated at Ruthin Castle in Wales.

The Bearers of the Great Golden Spurs, or Saint George's Spurs, the emblems of knighthood and chivalry, perform their service jure sanguinis, dependent upon descent from William, Earl of Pembroke, heir to his brother, John le Marshal, who carried the Spurs at the Coronation of Richard I in 1189. The Marshals failed in the male line and the hereditary right descended in the female line through the Hastings family to the Lords Grey de Ruthyn, later Marquesses of Hastings. The male line failed again and an equal right in the female line descended in 1911 to the Earl of Loudoun (Abney-Hastings) and Lord Grey de Ruthyn (Clifton).

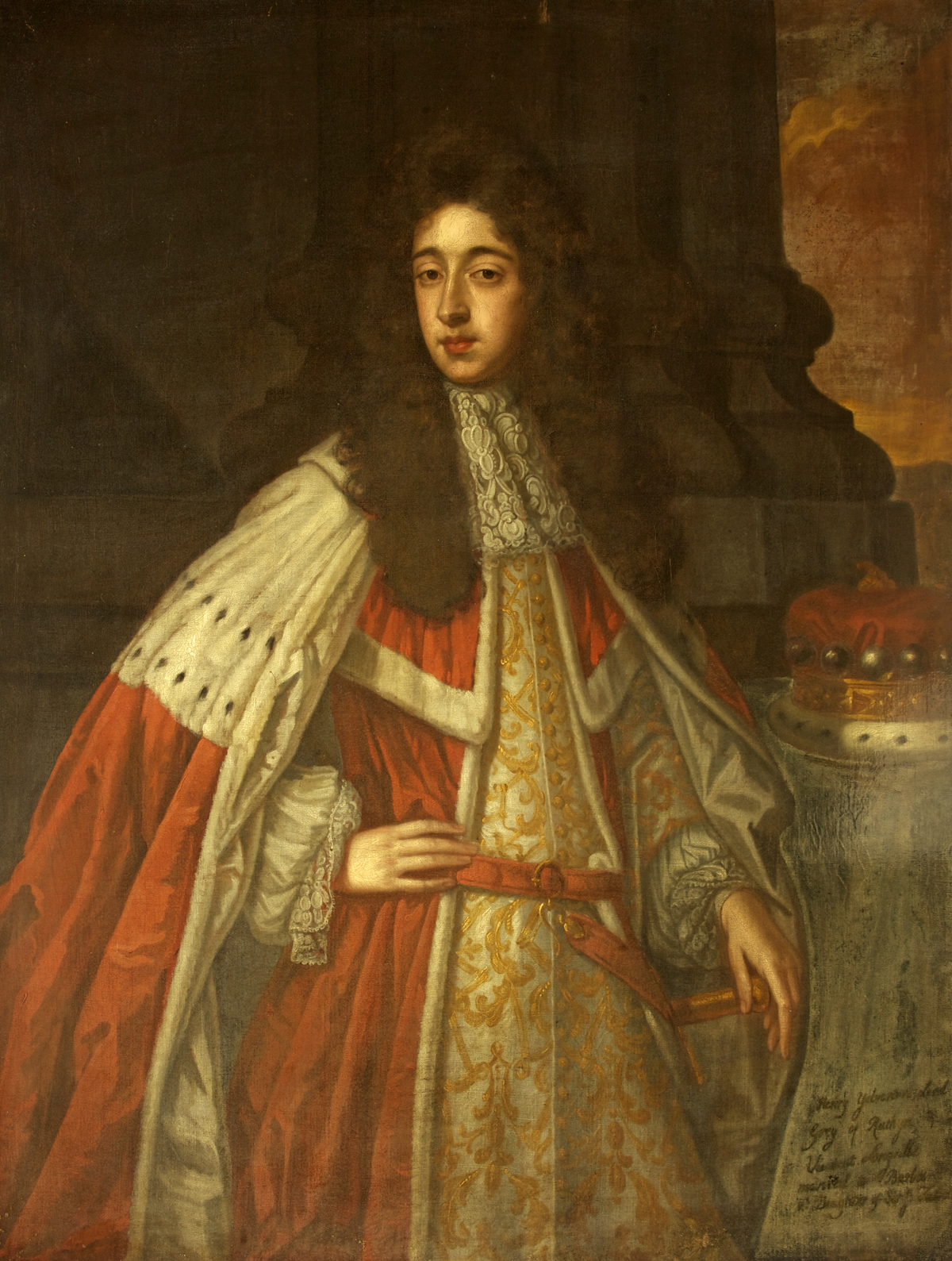
Henry, Viscount Longueville in 1690

== Barons Grey of Ruthin (1324) ==
- Roger Grey, 1st Baron Grey of Ruthin (d. 1353)
- Reynold Grey, 2nd Baron Grey of Ruthin (1319–1388)
- Reynold Grey, 3rd Baron Grey of Ruthin (1362–1440)
- Edmund Grey, 4th Baron Grey of Ruthin, 1st Earl of Kent (1416–1490)
- George Grey, 5th Baron Grey of Ruthin, 2nd Earl of Kent (d. 1503)
- Richard Grey, 6th Baron Grey of Ruthin, 3rd Earl of Kent (1478–1523)
- Henry Grey, 7th Baron Grey of Ruthin, 4th Earl of Kent (d. 1562)
- Reginald Grey, 8th Baron Grey of Ruthin, 5th Earl of Kent (d. 1573)
- Henry Grey, 9th Baron Grey of Ruthin, 6th Earl of Kent (1541–1615)
- Charles Grey, 10th Baron Grey of Ruthin, 7th Earl of Kent (1545–1623)
- Henry Grey, 11th Baron Grey of Ruthin, 8th Earl of Kent (1583–1639)
- Charles Longueville, 12th Baron Grey of Ruthin (1612–1643)
- Susan Longueville, 13th Baroness Grey of Ruthin (1634–1676)
- Charles Yelverton, 14th Baron Grey of Ruthin (1657–1679)
- Henry Yelverton, 15th Baron Grey of Ruthin, 1st Viscount Longueville (1664–1704)
- Talbot Yelverton, 16th Baron Grey of Ruthin, 1st Earl of Sussex (1690–1731)
- George Augustus Yelverton, 17th Grey of Ruthin, 2nd Earl of Sussex (1727–1758)
- Henry Yelverton, 18th Baron Grey of Ruthin, 3rd Earl of Sussex (1728–1799)
- Henry Edward Yelverton, 19th Baron Grey de Ruthyn (1780–1810)
- Barbara Yelverton, 20th Baroness Grey of Ruthin (1810–1858)
- Henry Weysford Charles Plantagenet Rawdon-Hastings, 21st Baron Grey of Ruthin, 4th Marquess of Hastings (1842–1868) (abeyant 1868)
- Bertha Lelgarde Clifton, 22nd Baroness Grey de Ruthyn (1835–1887) (abeyance terminated 1885)
- Rawdon George Grey Clifton, 23rd Baron Grey de Ruthyn (1858–1912)
- Cecil Talbot Clifton, 24th Baron Grey de Ruthyn (9 January 1862 – 21 May 1934) (abeyant 1934)
- John Lancelot Wykeham Butler-Bowdon, 25th Baron Grey de Ruthyn (1883–1963) (abeyance terminated 1940, abeyant 1963)

== Co-heirs ==
All descend from the 22nd Baroness's three sisters:

- Barbara Rawdon-Hastings, Marchioness of Hastings (1810–1858), 20th Baroness Grey de Ruthyn
  - Paulyn Reginald Serlo Rawdon-Hastings (1832–1851), 3rd Marquess of Hastings
  - Edith Maud Rawdon-Hastings (1833–1874), 10th Countess of Loudoun
    - Paulyn Abney-Hastings (1856–1907)
      - Edith Maud Abney-Hastings (1883–1960), 12th Countess of Loudoun
        - Barbara Huddleston Abney-Hastings (1919–2002), 13th Countess of Loudoun
          - Michael Edward Abney-Hastings (1942–2012), 14th Earl of Loudoun
            - 1. Simon Abney-Hastings, 15th Earl of Loudoun (b. 1974), 15th Earl of Loudoun
        - Jean Huddleston Campbell of Loudoun (b. 1920)
          - 2. Sheena Wakefield (b. 1941)
          - 3. Flora Ann Madeline Hubble (b. 1957)
        - Fiona Huddleston Abney-Hastings (b. 1923)
          - Christopher Ian de Fresnes (1942–2013), 13th Baron de Fresnes
            - 4. Robert Marcel de Fresnes (b. 1970), 14th Baron de Fresnes
        - Edith Huddleston Abney-Hastings (b. 1925)
          - 5. Norman Angus MacLaren (b. 1948)
      - Elizabeth Abney-Hastings (1884–1974), 22nd Baroness Hungerford, 20th Baroness Moleyns, 14th Baroness Strange
        - Jestyn Reginald Austin Plantagenet Philipps (1917–1991), 2nd Viscount St Davids
          - Colwyn Jestyn John Philipps (1939–2009), 3rd Viscount St Davids
            - 6. Rhodri Colwyn Philipps (b. 1966), 4th Viscount St Davids
  - Bertha Lelgarde Clifton (1835–1887), 22nd Baroness Grey de Ruthyn
    - Ella Cicely Mary Clifton (1856–1912)
      - John Lancelot Wykeham Butler-Bowden (1883–1963), 25th Baron Grey de Ruthyn
    - Rawdon George Grey Clifton (1858–1912), 23rd Baron Grey de Ruthyn
    - Cecil Talbot Clifton (1862–1934), 24th Baron Grey de Ruthyn
  - Victoria Maria Louisa Rawdon-Hastings (1837–1888)
    - Mary Evelyn Bertha Emily Kirwan (1861–1902)
      - Count Stanislas Mary Joseph Lubienski Bodenham (b. 1899)
        - Count Charles Henry Lubienski Bodenham (b. 1935)
          - 7. Count Paul Lubienski Bodenham (b. 1965)
  - Henry Weysford Charles Plantagenet Rawdon-Hastings (1842–1868), 4th Marquess of Hastings, 21st Baron Grey of Ruthyn
  - Frances Augusta Constance Muir Rawdon-Hastings (1844–1910)
    - Sydney Edward Marsham (1879–1952)
      - Peter William Marsham (1913–1970)
      - 8. Julian Charles Marsham (b. 1948), 8th Earl of Romney

== Family tree ==
Grosvenor and Grey family tree: Dukes of Westminster, Marquesses of Westminster
Earls: Grosvenor, Sussex (5th creation), and of Wilton
Viscounts: Belgrave, Grey de Wilton, and de Longueville and
Barons: Grey de Wilton, Grey of Ruthin (Ruthyn), Grey de Radcliffe, Ebury, Grosvenor, and Stalbridge

Baron Grey de Wilton (1st creation), 1285
Reginald Grey d. 1308; 1st Baron Grey de Wilton
John Grey c. 1268–1323; 2nd Baron Grey de Wilton
Baron Grey of Ruthin, 1324
Henry Grey; 1281–1342; 3rd Baron Grey de Wilton	Roger Grey d. 1352/1353; 1st Baron Grey of Ruthin	King Edward III; 1312–1377
Reynold Grey; 1311–1370; 4th Baron Grey de Wilton	Reynold Grey c. 1322 – c. 1388; 2nd Baron Grey of Ruthin	John of Gaunt; 1340–1399	Thomas Holland; Earl of Kent c. 1314–1360
Henry Grey c. 1340–1396; 5th Baron Grey de Wilton	Reynold Grey c. 1362 – c. 1440; 3rd Baron Grey of Ruthin	Elizabeth of Lancaster bef. 1363–1426	John Holland; Earl of Huntingdon; Duke of Exeter c. 1352–1400
Richard Grey c. 1393–1442; 6th Baron Grey de Wilton	John Grey c. 1387–1439	Constance Holland; 1387–1437
Reynold Grey c. 1421–1493/94; 7th Baron Grey de Wilton	Edmund Grey c. 1362 – c. 1440; 1st Earl of Kent, 4th Baron Grey of Ruthin	See Template:Dukes of Kent family tree
Edmund Grey d. 1499; 8th Baron Grey de Wilton	George Grey; 2nd Earl of Kent, 5th Baron Grey of Ruthin c. 1460–1503
Edmund Grey c. 1469–1511; 9th Baron Grey de Wilton	Richard Grey; 3rd Earl of Kent, 6th Baron Grey of Ruthin; 1481–1524	Henry Grey; 4th Earl of Kent, 7th Baron Grey of Ruthin c. 1495–1562
George Grey c. 1493–1514/1515; 10th Baron Grey de Wilton	Thomas Grey c. 1496–1517; 11th Baron Grey de Wilton	Richard Grey c. 1505–1523; 12th Baron Grey de Wilton	William Grey c. 1509–1562; 13th Baron Grey de Wilton	Henry Grey; 1520–1545
Arthur Grey; 1536–1593; 14th Baron Grey de Wilton	Reginald Grey d. 1573; 5th Earl of Kent, 8th Baron Grey of Ruthin	Henry Grey; 1541–1615; 6th Earl of Kent, 9th Baron Grey of Ruthin	Charles Grey c. 1545–1623; 7th Earl of Kent, 10th Baron Grey of Ruthyn
Bridget Grey d. 1648	Thomas Grey; 1575–1614; 15th Baron Grey de Wilton	Susan Grey	Henry Grey c. 1583–1639; 8th Earl of Kent, 11th Baron Grey of Ruthyn
Barony Grey de Wilton (1st creation) extinct, 1614
Baronet of Egerton and Oulton, 1617
Roland Egerton d. 1646; 1st Baronet	Charles Longueville; 1612–1643; 12th Baron Grey de Ruthyn
John Egerton d. 1674; 2nd Baronet	Susan Longueville d. 1676; 13th Baroness Grey de Ruthyn suo jure
Viscount Longueville (1st creation), 1690
John Egerton d. 1729; 3rd Baronet	Charles Yelverton; 1657–1679; 14th Baron Grey de Ruthyn	Henry Yelverton c. 1664–1703/1704; 1st Viscount Longueville, 15th Baron Grey de Ruthyn
Earl of Sussex (5th creation), 1717
Holland Egerton c. 1689–1730; 4th Baronet	Talbot Yelverton c. 1664–1703/1704; 1st Earl of Sussex, 2nd Viscount Longueville, 16th Baron Grey de Ruthyn
Edward Egerton bef. 1721–1743/1744; 5th Baronet	Thomas Grey Egerton c. 1721–1756; 6th Baronet	George Augustus Yelverton; 1727–1758; 2nd Earl of Sussex, 3rd Viscount de Longueville, 17th Baron Grey de Ruthyn	Henry Yelverton; 1728–1799; 3rd Earl of Sussex, 4th Viscount de Longueville, 18th Baron Grey de Ruthyn
Earldom of Sussex (5th creation) and Viscountcy de Longueville (1st creation) extinct, 1799
Baron Grosvenor of Eaton in the County of Chester, 1761 Earl Gosvenor and Viscount Belgrave of Belgrave in the County of Chester, 1784	Baron Grey de Wilton (2nd creation), 1784 Earl of Wilton and Viscount Grey de Wilton, 1801
Richard Grosvenor; 1731–1802; 7th Baronet of Eaton, 1st Earl Grosvenor, Viscount Belgrave, and Baron Grosvenor	Thomas Egerton; 1749–1814; 7th Baronet of Egerton and Oulton, 1st Earl of Wilton, Viscount Grey de Wilton, and Baron Grey de Wilton	Barbara Yelverton d. 1781
Barony Grey de Wilton (2nd creation) extinct, 1784
Marquess of Westminster, 1831
Robert Grosvenor; 1767–1845; 1st Marquess of Westminster, 2nd Earl Grosvenor, Viscount Belgrave, and Baron Grosvenor	Eleanor Egerton; 1770–1846	Henry Yelverton; 1780–1810; 19th Baron Grey de Ruthyn
Baron Ebury of Ebury Manor in the County of Middlesex, 1857
Richard Grosvenor; 1795–1869; 2nd Marquess of Westminster, 3rd Earl Grosvenor, Viscount Belgrave, and Baron Grosvenor	Thomas Grosvenor (Egerton); 1799–1882; 2nd Earl of Wilton and Viscount Grey de Wilton	Robert Grosvenor; 1801–1893; 1st Baron Ebury	Barbara Rawdon-Hastings; 1810–1858; 20th Baroness Grey de Ruthyn suo jure	George Augustus Francis Rawdon-Hastings; 1808–1844; Marquess of Hastings
Duke of Westminster, 1874	Baron Stalbridge of Stalbridge in the County of Dorset, 1886	Baron Grey de Radcliffe in the County Palatine of Lancaster, 1875	Barony Grey de Ruthin (Ruthyn) abeyance terminated, 1885
Hugh Lupus Grosvenor; 1825–1899; 1st Duke of Westminster, 3rd Marquess of Westminster, 4th Earl Grosvenor, Viscount Belgrave, and Baron Grosvenor	Richard de Aquila Grosvenor; 1837–1912; 1st Baron Stalbridge	Arthur Edward Holland Grey Egerton; 1833–1885; 3rd Earl of Wilton and Viscount Grey de Wilton, Baron Grey de Radcliffe	Seymour John Grey Egerton; 1839–1898; 4th Earl of Wilton and Viscount Grey de Wilton	Robert Wellesley Grosvenor; 1834–1918; 2nd Baron Ebury	Bertha Lelgarde Clifton; 1835–1887; 22nd Baroness Grey de Ruthyn suo jure	Henry Weysford Charles Plantagenet Rawdon-Hastings; 1842–1868; Marquess of Hastings, Earl of Loudoun, 21st Baron Grey de Ruthyn, Baron Botreaux, Baron Hungerford, Baron de Moleyns, Baron Hastings
Barony Grey de Radcliffe extinct, 1885	Barony Grey de Ruthyn abeyant, 1868
Victor Alexander Grosvenor; 1853–1884 styled Earl Grosvenor	Henry George Grosvenor; 1861–1914	Hugh Grosvenor; 1880–1949; 2nd Baron Stalbridge	Arthur George Egerton; 1863–1915; 5th Earl of Wilton and Viscount Grey de Wilton	Robert Victor Grosvenor; 1868–1921; 3rd Baron Ebury	Ella Cicely Mary Clifton; 1856–1912	Rawdon George Grey Clifton; 1858–1912; 23rd Baron Grey de Ruthyn	Cecil Talbot Clifton; 1862–1934; 24th Baron Grey de Ruthyn
Barony Stalbridge extinct, 1949	Barony Grey de Ruthyn abeyant, 1934
Barony Grey de Ruthyn abeyance terminated, 1940
Hugh Richard Arthur Grosvenor; 1879–1953; 2nd Duke of Westminster, 4th Marquess of Westminster, 5th Earl Grosvenor, Viscount Belgrave, and Baron Grosvenor	William Grosvenor; 1894–1963; 3rd Duke of Westminster, 5th Marquess of Westminster, 6th Earl Grosvenor, Viscount Belgrave, and Baron Grosvenor	Hugh William Grosvenor; 1884–1914	Seymour Edward Frederick Egerton; 1896–1927; 6th Earl of Wilton and Viscount Grey de Wilton	Francis Egerton Grosvenor; 1883–1932; 4th Baron Ebury	John Lancelot Wykeham Butler-Bowden; 1883–1963; 25th Baron Grey de Ruthyn
Barony Grey de Ruthyn abeyant, 1963
Gerald Hugh Grosvenor; 1907–1967; 4th Duke of Westminster, 6th Marquess of Westminster, 7th Earl Grosvenor, Viscount Belgrave, and Baron Grosvenor	Robert George Grosvenor; 1910–1979; 5th Duke of Westminster, 7th Marquess of Westminster, 8th Earl Grosvenor, Viscount Belgrave, and Baron Grosvenor	Seymour William Arthur John Egerton; 1921–1999; 7th Earl of Wilton and Viscount Grey de Wilton	Robert Grosvenor; 1914–1957; 5th Baron Ebury
Francis Grosvenor b. 1934; 8th Earl of Wilton and Viscount Grey de Wilton, 6th Baron Ebury heir presumptive to the Marquessate of Westminster
Gerald Cavendish Grosvenor; 1951–2016; 6th Duke of Westminster, 8th Marquess of Westminster, 9th Earl Grosvenor, Viscount Belgrave, and Baron Grosvenor	Julian Grosvenor b. 1959 styled Viscount Grey de Wilton
Heir apparent to the 8th Earldom of Wilton
Hugh Grosvenor b. 1991; 7th Duke of Westminster, 9th Marquess of Westminster, 10th Earl Grosvenor, Viscount Belgrave, and Baron Grosvenor
