= Grey Egerton baronets =

English noble title

The Egerton, later Grey Egerton, later still Egerton baronetcy, of Egerton and Oulton in the county of Chester, is a title in the Baronetage of England held by the senior patrilineal branch of the Egerton family.

One of the earliest English baronetcies created, Sir Roland Egerton left many male descendants in remainder to his title.

== History ==
Egerton arms

=== Background ===
The baronetcy was created on 5 April 1617 for Sir Roland Egerton, whose family were established by the 13th century in Cheshire. The Anglo-Norman chevalier David le Clerc de Malpas migrated to England, and was appointed justice for Cheshire by King Henry III in 1252. Le Clerc held three knights' fees for the county, owing the King their service as and when summoned to war. His second son named Philip le Goch (translated from the brythonic as 'the Red') was lord of the manor of Egerton, Cheshire.

The late 15th-century head of the family, Philip Egerton of Egerton, married Margery, daughter of Sir William Mainwaring; he died in 1474 at the height of the civil strife, leaving a number of sons: the second was Sir Ralph Egerton of Ridley, whose illegitimate son by a concubine, Alice Sparks, was Thomas Egerton (also translated as Edgerton or Egert branch), created Viscount Brackley after rising to high office in the Elizabethan court (see Earls and Dukes of Bridgewater). Their elder son, John Egerton of Egerton (died 1483), married Elizabeth, daughter and heir of Hugh Done of Oulton, and paternal granddaughter of James Touchet, Lord Audley. Their only son was Philip Egerton of Egerton and Oulton (died 1534), who married Joan, a widow of Sir Richard Winnington and daughter and coheir of Gilbert Smith of Cuerdley, Lancashire, leaving only one son: Sir Philip (died 1563) who married Eleanor, daughter of Sir Randle Brereton, of Malpas; their eldest son was John Egerton (died 1590) married Jane, daughter of Sir Piers Mostyn, whose eldest son was Sir John Egerton.

=== Egerton baronetcy ===
Sir Roland's parents were Sir John Egerton of Egerton and Oulton (1551-1614) by his first wife Margaret Stanley, daughter of Sir Rowland Stanley, of Hooton; they left eleven children. Sir Roland later represented Wootton Bassett in Parliament. Egerton married Bridget, sister and co-heir of Thomas, 15th Baron Grey de Wilton, who was attainted in 1603 forfeiting his title (see Baron Grey de Wilton). The Egertons were ancient Cheshire landowners: an ancestor of the first baronet, William le Belward, took the surname of Egerton from the lordship of Egerton, which he inherited.

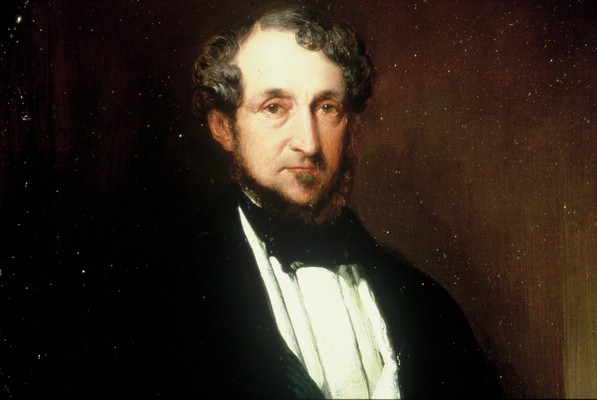
Sir Thomas Egerton, 7th Bart. later Baron Grey de Wilton & Earl of Wilton.

The 6th Baronet sat as Member of Parliament for Newton. The 7th Baronet was revived as Baron Grey de Wilton, a title held by his ancestors to which he was in remainder, his peerage title was created with remainder to his heirs male. In 1801 he was elevated as Viscount Grey de Wilton and Earl of Wilton, of Wilton Castle in the County of Hereford, in the Peerage of the United Kingdom. These titles were created with special remainder to the second and the younger sons successively of his daughter Lady Eleanor Egerton, who married Robert Grosvenor thereby becoming Marchioness of Westminster.

On Lord Wilton's death in 1814 the barony became extinct as he had no sons, while he was succeeded in the viscountcy and earldom according to the special remainder by his grandson Thomas Grosvenor (1799–1882), who adopted the surname of Egerton becoming the second Earl, later passing on the title to his descendants. The baronetcy devolved to his kinsman, Sir John Grey Egerton as 8th Baronet, a descendant of a younger son of the first baronet; he represented Chester in the House of Commons. In 1825 the 9th Baronet was granted by Royal Licence that all subsequent baronets upon succeeding to the title, could assume for themselves only the additional surname of Grey and the arms and supporters of Grey de Wilton. The 10th Baronet, Sir Philip, was a politician and noted palaeontologist. The 16th baronet was a major general in the British Army who inherited the baronetcy at the age of 94; General Egerton opted not to use the customary style of Sir (nor the additional surname of Grey). As of 2016, the title is held by his son Sir William Egerton, the 17th Baronet, who succeeded in 2010.

== Notable family members ==
Several other members of this branch of the Egerton family have also gained distinction. Major-General Caledon Richard Egerton, fifth son of the ninth baronet, served as a General in the British Army. His third son, Sir Charles Egerton, became a Field Marshal in the British Army, whose son Vice-Admiral Wion de Malpas Egerton, Royal Navy (1879–1943), was killed in action during the Second World War; his son Sir David Egerton (1914–2010), a Major-General late Royal Artillery, who was awarded the Military Cross later appointed CB, succeeded his second cousin as the 16th baronet in 2008.

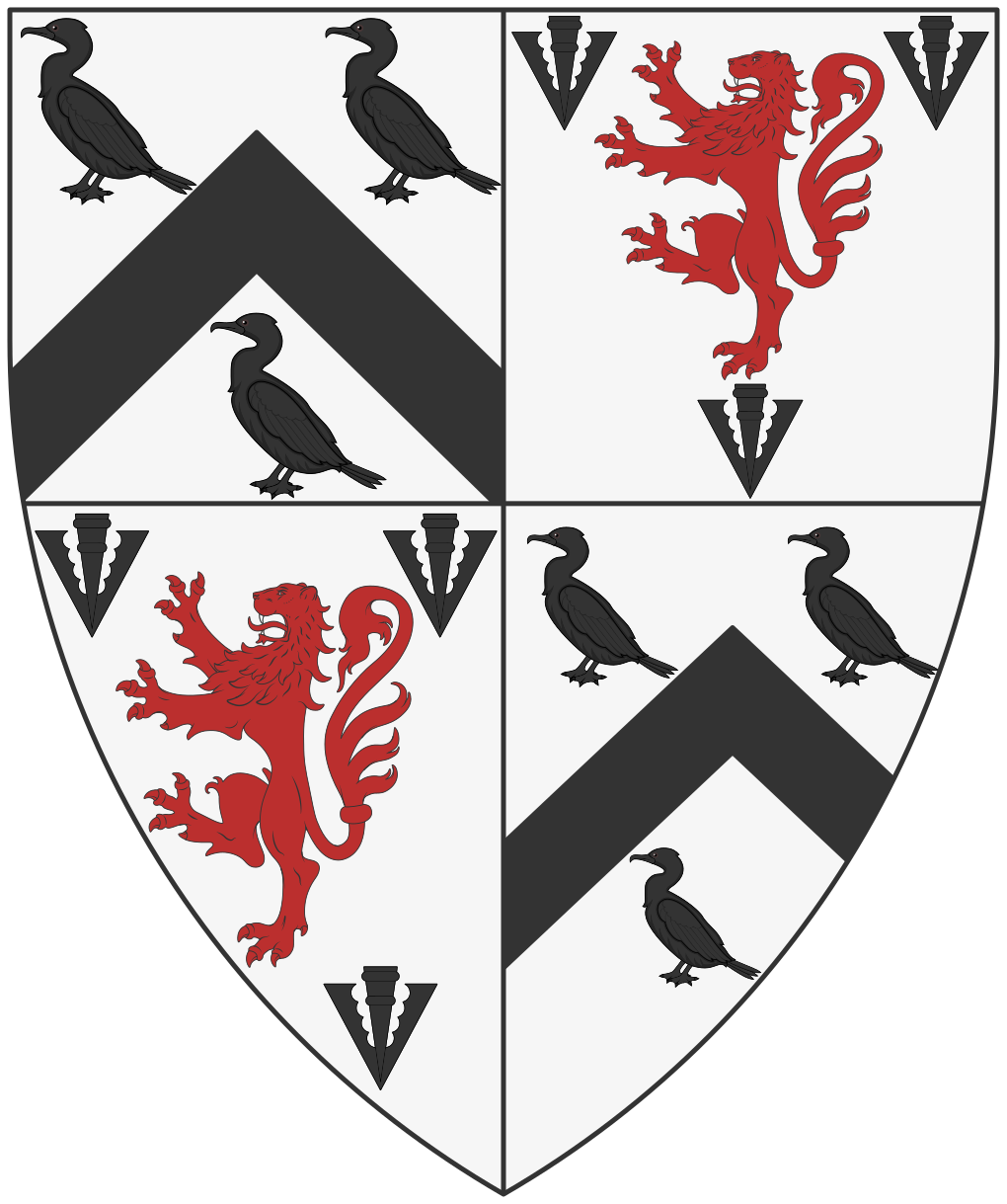
Egerton-Warburton arms

Sir Reginald Arthur Egerton (1850–1930), another son of the aforementioned Major-General Caledon Egerton (1814–1874), was Private Secretary to the Postmaster-General, Surveyor to the General Post Office, London, and Secretary-General to the GPO, Dublin. Sir Stephen Loftus Egerton (1932–2006) (son of William le Belward Egerton, son of William Egerton, son of Philip Henry Egerton, son of William Egerton, third son of Philip Egerton, father of the eighth and ninth baronets), was a prominent diplomat; he served as HM Ambassador to Iraq from 1980 to 1982 and Ambassador to Saudi Arabia from 1986 to 1989.

Sir Robert Eyles Egerton (1827–1912), youngest son of William Egerton (1770–1827), third son of Philip Egerton (1731–1786), father of the eighth and ninth baronets, was Lieutenant-Governor of the Punjab. His son Sir Raleigh Gilbert Egerton (1860–1931) was a Lieutenant-General in the British Army.

A cadet branch of the family is settled in Australia (see Colonel Peter Egerton-Warburton), whose descendants are in remainder to the family baronetcy: one of the present-day members of the family is Dick Warburton AO LVO, while another branch runs the Mount Barker winery in Western Australia.

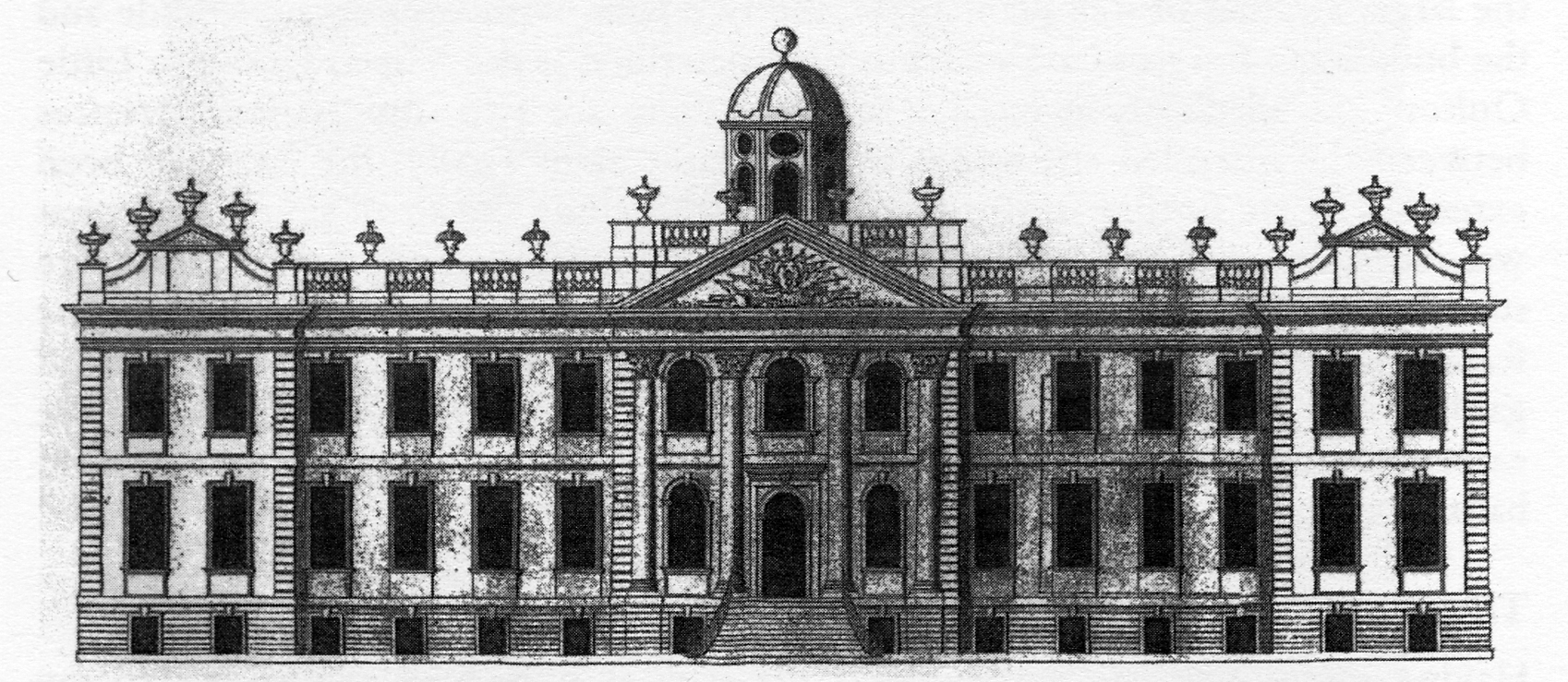
North aspect of Oulton Hall, Cheshire, c. 1735

== Egerton, later Grey Egerton baronets, of Egerton and Oulton (1617) ==
- Sir Roland Egerton, 1st Baronet (died 1646)
- Sir John Egerton, 2nd Baronet (died 1674)
- Sir John Egerton, 3rd Baronet (c. 1658 – 1729)
- Sir Holland Egerton, 4th Baronet (c. 1689 – 1730)
- Sir Edward Egerton, 5th Baronet (c. 1719 – 1744)
- Sir Thomas Grey Egerton, 6th Baronet (c. 1721 – 1756)
- Sir Thomas Grey Egerton, 7th Baronet (1749–1814) (created Earl of Wilton in 1801);

== Earls of Wilton (1801) ==
- Thomas Egerton, 1st Earl of Wilton (1749–1814): succeeded as Earl of Wilton, according to the special remainder, by his grandson Thomas Grosvenor (1799–1882):
  - see Earl of Wilton;

== Grey Egerton baronets, of Egerton and Oulton (1617; reverted) ==
Grey Egerton arms

- Sir John Grey Egerton, 8th Baronet (1766–1825)
- Sir Philip Grey Egerton, 9th Baronet (1767–1829)
- Sir Philip de Malpas Grey Egerton, 10th Baronet (1806–1881)
- Sir Philip le Belward Grey Egerton, 11th Baronet (1833–1891)
- Sir Philip Henry Brian Grey-Egerton, 12th Baronet (1864–1937)
- Sir Brooke de Malpas Grey Egerton, 13th Baronet (1845–1945)
- Sir Philip Reginald le Belward Grey Egerton, 14th Baronet (1885–1962)
- Sir (Philip) John Caledon Grey Egerton, 15th Baronet (1920–2008)
- General Sir David Boswell Egerton, 16th Baronet (1914–2010)
- Sir William de Malpas Egerton, 17th Baronet (born 1949);
  - Matthew Robert Egerton (born 1977), his elder son, is heir apparent to the baronetcy.

== Family tree ==
Grosvenor and Grey family tree: Dukes of Westminster, Marquesses of Westminster
Earls: Grosvenor, Sussex (5th creation), and of Wilton
Viscounts: Belgrave, Grey de Wilton, and de Longueville and
Barons: Grey de Wilton, Grey of Ruthin (Ruthyn), Grey de Radcliffe, Ebury, Grosvenor, and Stalbridge

Baron Grey de Wilton (1st creation), 1285
Reginald Grey d. 1308; 1st Baron Grey de Wilton
John Grey c. 1268–1323; 2nd Baron Grey de Wilton
Baron Grey of Ruthin, 1324
Henry Grey; 1281–1342; 3rd Baron Grey de Wilton	Roger Grey d. 1352/1353; 1st Baron Grey of Ruthin	King Edward III; 1312–1377
Reynold Grey; 1311–1370; 4th Baron Grey de Wilton	Reynold Grey c. 1322 – c. 1388; 2nd Baron Grey of Ruthin	John of Gaunt; 1340–1399	Thomas Holland; Earl of Kent c. 1314–1360
Henry Grey c. 1340–1396; 5th Baron Grey de Wilton	Reynold Grey c. 1362 – c. 1440; 3rd Baron Grey of Ruthin	Elizabeth of Lancaster bef. 1363–1426	John Holland; Earl of Huntingdon; Duke of Exeter c. 1352–1400
Richard Grey c. 1393–1442; 6th Baron Grey de Wilton	John Grey c. 1387–1439	Constance Holland; 1387–1437
Reynold Grey c. 1421–1493/94; 7th Baron Grey de Wilton	Edmund Grey c. 1362 – c. 1440; 1st Earl of Kent, 4th Baron Grey of Ruthin	See Template:Dukes of Kent family tree
Edmund Grey d. 1499; 8th Baron Grey de Wilton	George Grey; 2nd Earl of Kent, 5th Baron Grey of Ruthin c. 1460–1503
Edmund Grey c. 1469–1511; 9th Baron Grey de Wilton	Richard Grey; 3rd Earl of Kent, 6th Baron Grey of Ruthin; 1481–1524	Henry Grey; 4th Earl of Kent, 7th Baron Grey of Ruthin c. 1495–1562
George Grey c. 1493–1514/1515; 10th Baron Grey de Wilton	Thomas Grey c. 1496–1517; 11th Baron Grey de Wilton	Richard Grey c. 1505–1523; 12th Baron Grey de Wilton	William Grey c. 1509–1562; 13th Baron Grey de Wilton	Henry Grey; 1520–1545
Arthur Grey; 1536–1593; 14th Baron Grey de Wilton	Reginald Grey d. 1573; 5th Earl of Kent, 8th Baron Grey of Ruthin	Henry Grey; 1541–1615; 6th Earl of Kent, 9th Baron Grey of Ruthin	Charles Grey c. 1545–1623; 7th Earl of Kent, 10th Baron Grey of Ruthyn
Bridget Grey d. 1648	Thomas Grey; 1575–1614; 15th Baron Grey de Wilton	Susan Grey	Henry Grey c. 1583–1639; 8th Earl of Kent, 11th Baron Grey of Ruthyn
Barony Grey de Wilton (1st creation) extinct, 1614
Baronet of Egerton and Oulton, 1617
Roland Egerton d. 1646; 1st Baronet	Charles Longueville; 1612–1643; 12th Baron Grey de Ruthyn
John Egerton d. 1674; 2nd Baronet	Susan Longueville d. 1676; 13th Baroness Grey de Ruthyn suo jure
Viscount Longueville (1st creation), 1690
John Egerton d. 1729; 3rd Baronet	Charles Yelverton; 1657–1679; 14th Baron Grey de Ruthyn	Henry Yelverton c. 1664–1703/1704; 1st Viscount Longueville, 15th Baron Grey de Ruthyn
Earl of Sussex (5th creation), 1717
Holland Egerton c. 1689–1730; 4th Baronet	Talbot Yelverton c. 1664–1703/1704; 1st Earl of Sussex, 2nd Viscount Longueville, 16th Baron Grey de Ruthyn
Edward Egerton bef. 1721–1743/1744; 5th Baronet	Thomas Grey Egerton c. 1721–1756; 6th Baronet	George Augustus Yelverton; 1727–1758; 2nd Earl of Sussex, 3rd Viscount de Longueville, 17th Baron Grey de Ruthyn	Henry Yelverton; 1728–1799; 3rd Earl of Sussex, 4th Viscount de Longueville, 18th Baron Grey de Ruthyn
Earldom of Sussex (5th creation) and Viscountcy de Longueville (1st creation) extinct, 1799
Baron Grosvenor of Eaton in the County of Chester, 1761 Earl Gosvenor and Viscount Belgrave of Belgrave in the County of Chester, 1784	Baron Grey de Wilton (2nd creation), 1784 Earl of Wilton and Viscount Grey de Wilton, 1801
Richard Grosvenor; 1731–1802; 7th Baronet of Eaton, 1st Earl Grosvenor, etc.	Thomas Egerton; 1749–1814; 7th Baronet of Egerton and Oulton, 1st Earl of Wilton, etc.	Barbara Yelverton d. 1781
Barony Grey de Wilton (2nd creation) extinct, 1784
Marquess of Westminster, 1831
Robert Grosvenor; 1767–1845; 1st Marquess of Westminster, 2nd Earl Grosvenor, etc.	Eleanor Egerton; 1770–1846	Henry Yelverton; 1780–1810; 19th Baron Grey de Ruthyn
Baron Ebury of Ebury Manor in the County of Middlesex, 1857
Richard Grosvenor; 1795–1869; 2nd Marquess of Westminster, 3rd Earl Grosvenor, etc.	Thomas Grosvenor (Egerton); 1799–1882; 2nd Earl of Wilton, etc.	Robert Grosvenor; 1801–1893; 1st Baron Ebury	Barbara Rawdon-Hastings; 1810–1858; 20th Baroness Grey de Ruthyn suo jure	George Augustus Francis Rawdon-Hastings; 1808–1844; Marquess of Hastings
Duke of Westminster, 1874	Baron Stalbridge of Stalbridge in the County of Dorset, 1886	Baron Grey de Radcliffe in the County Palatine of Lancaster, 1875	Barony Grey de Ruthin (Ruthyn) abeyance terminated, 1885
Hugh Lupus Grosvenor; 1825–1899; 1st Duke of Westminster, 3rd Marquess of Westminster, 4th Earl Grosvenor, etc.	Richard de Aquila Grosvenor; 1837–1912; 1st Baron Stalbridge	Arthur Edward Holland Grey Egerton; 1833–1885; 3rd Earl of Wilton and Viscount Grey de Wilton, Baron Grey de Radcliffe	Seymour John Grey Egerton; 1839–1898; 4th Earl of Wilton, etc.	Robert Wellesley Grosvenor; 1834–1918; 2nd Baron Ebury	Bertha Lelgarde Clifton; 1835–1887; 22nd Baroness Grey de Ruthyn suo jure	Henry Weysford Charles Plantagenet Rawdon-Hastings; 1842–1868; Marquess of Hastings, Earl of Loudoun, 21st Baron Grey de Ruthyn, Baron Botreaux, Baron Hungerford, Baron de Moleyns, Baron Hastings
Barony Grey de Radcliffe extinct, 1885	Barony Grey de Ruthyn abeyant, 1868
Victor Alexander Grosvenor; 1853–1884 styled Earl Grosvenor	Henry George Grosvenor; 1861–1914	Hugh Grosvenor; 1880–1949; 2nd Baron Stalbridge	Arthur George Egerton; 1863–1915; 5th Earl of Wilton, etc.	Robert Victor Grosvenor; 1868–1921; 3rd Baron Ebury	Ella Cicely Mary Clifton; 1856–1912	Rawdon George Grey Clifton; 1858–1912; 23rd Baron Grey de Ruthyn	Cecil Talbot Clifton; 1862–1934; 24th Baron Grey de Ruthyn
Barony Stalbridge extinct, 1949	Barony Grey de Ruthyn abeyant, 1934
Barony Grey de Ruthyn abeyance terminated, 1940
Hugh Richard Arthur Grosvenor; 1879–1953; 2nd Duke of Westminster, 4th Marquess of Westminster, 5th Earl Grosvenor, etc.	William Grosvenor; 1894–1963; 3rd Duke of Westminster, 5th Marquess of Westminster, 6th Earl Grosvenor, etc.	Hugh William Grosvenor; 1884–1914	Seymour Edward Frederick Egerton; 1896–1927; 6th Earl of Wilton, etc.	Francis Egerton Grosvenor; 1883–1932; 4th Baron Ebury	John Lancelot Wykeham Butler-Bowden; 1883–1963; 25th Baron Grey de Ruthyn
Barony Grey de Ruthyn abeyant, 1963
Gerald Hugh Grosvenor; 1907–1967; 4th Duke of Westminster, 6th Marquess of Westminster, 7th Earl Grosvenor, etc.	Robert George Grosvenor; 1910–1979; 5th Duke of Westminster, 7th Marquess of Westminster, 8th Earl Grosvenor, etc.	Seymour William Arthur John Egerton; 1921–1999; 7th Earl of Wilton, etc.	Robert Grosvenor; 1914–1957; 5th Baron Ebury
Francis Grosvenor b. 1934; 8th Earl of Wilton and Viscount Grey de Wilton, 6th Baron Ebury and heir presumptive to the Marquessate of Westminster
Gerald Cavendish Grosvenor; 1951–2016; 6th Duke of Westminster, 8th Marquess of Westminster, 9th Earl Grosvenor, etc.	Julian Grosvenor b. 1959 styled Viscount Grey de Wilton
Heir apparent to the Earldom of Wilton
Hugh Grosvenor b. 1991; 7th Duke of Westminster, 9th Marquess of Westminster, 10th Earl Grosvenor, etc.
Cosima Florence Grosvenor b. 2025
Heir presumptive to the Dukedom of Westminster

== See also ==
- Egerton family
- Baron Grey de Wilton
- Earl of Wilton

== Bibliography ==
- Brief biography of Sir Reginald Arthur Egerton
- Kidd, Charles; Williamson, David (1990). Debrett's Peerage and Baronetage. London and New York: St Martin's Press.
- Mosley, Charles (1999). Burke's Peerage and Baronetage of Great Britain and Ireland. Vol. 1 of 2 (106th ed.).
- Mosley, Charles (2003). Burke's Peerage and Baronetage of Great Britain and Ireland (107th ed.). London: Cassells.
- Kidd, Charles (2015). Debrett's Peerage and Baronetage.

Baronetage of England
Preceded by Dormer baronets	Egerton baronets 5 April 1617	Succeeded by Townshend baronets
