= Baron Stalbridge =

UK peerage 1886 - 1949

Baron Stalbridge, of Stalbridge in the County of Dorset, was a title in the Peerage of the United Kingdom. It was created on 22 March 1886 for the politician and businessman Lord Richard Grosvenor. He was the third son of Richard Grosvenor, 2nd Marquess of Westminster (see Duke of Westminster for earlier history of the family). On the death of Lord Stalbridge's eldest son, the second Baron, on 24 December 1949, the barony became extinct.

== Barons Stalbridge (1886) ==
- Richard de Aquila Grosvenor, 1st Baron Stalbridge (1837–1912)
- Hugh Grosvenor, 2nd Baron Stalbridge (1880–1949)

== Arms ==
Coat of arms of Baron Stalbridge
| Coronet A coronet of an Baron Crest A talbot statant or. Escutcheon Azure, a garb or; a crescent for difference. Supporters Two talbots reguardant or, collared azure and charged on the shoulder with a crescent of the second. Motto Virtus non stemma. (Virtue, not ancestry) |

== Family tree ==
Grosvenor and Grey family tree: Dukes of Westminster, Marquesses of Westminster
Earls: Grosvenor, Sussex (5th creation), and of Wilton
Viscounts: Belgrave, Grey de Wilton, and de Longueville and
Barons: Grey de Wilton, Grey of Ruthin (Ruthyn), Grey de Radcliffe, Ebury, Grosvenor, and Stalbridge

Baron Grey de Wilton (1st creation), 1285
Reginald Grey d. 1308; 1st Baron Grey de Wilton
John Grey c. 1268–1323; 2nd Baron Grey de Wilton
Baron Grey of Ruthin, 1324
Henry Grey; 1281–1342; 3rd Baron Grey de Wilton | Roger Grey d. 1352/1353; 1st Baron Grey of Ruthin | King Edward III; 1312–1377
Reynold Grey; 1311–1370; 4th Baron Grey de Wilton | Reynold Grey c. 1322 – c. 1388; 2nd Baron Grey of Ruthin | John of Gaunt; 1340–1399 | Thomas Holland; Earl of Kent c. 1314–1360
Henry Grey c. 1340–1396; 5th Baron Grey de Wilton | Reynold Grey c. 1362 – c. 1440; 3rd Baron Grey of Ruthin | Elizabeth of Lancaster bef. 1363–1426 | John Holland; Earl of Huntingdon; Duke of Exeter c. 1352–1400
Richard Grey c. 1393–1442; 6th Baron Grey de Wilton | John Grey c. 1387–1439 | Constance Holland; 1387–1437
Reynold Grey c. 1421–1493/94; 7th Baron Grey de Wilton | Edmund Grey c. 1362 – c. 1440; 1st Earl of Kent, 4th Baron Grey of Ruthin | See Template:Dukes of Kent family tree
Edmund Grey d. 1499; 8th Baron Grey de Wilton | George Grey; 2nd Earl of Kent, 5th Baron Grey of Ruthin c. 1460–1503
Edmund Grey c. 1469–1511; 9th Baron Grey de Wilton | Richard Grey; 3rd Earl of Kent, 6th Baron Grey of Ruthin; 1481–1524 | Henry Grey; 4th Earl of Kent, 7th Baron Grey of Ruthin c. 1495–1562
George Grey c. 1493–1514/1515; 10th Baron Grey de Wilton | Thomas Grey c. 1496–1517; 11th Baron Grey de Wilton | Richard Grey c. 1505–1523; 12th Baron Grey de Wilton | William Grey c. 1509–1562; 13th Baron Grey de Wilton | Henry Grey; 1520–1545
Arthur Grey; 1536–1593; 14th Baron Grey de Wilton | Reginald Grey d. 1573; 5th Earl of Kent, 8th Baron Grey of Ruthin | Henry Grey; 1541–1615; 6th Earl of Kent, 9th Baron Grey of Ruthin | Charles Grey c. 1545–1623; 7th Earl of Kent, 10th Baron Grey of Ruthyn
Bridget Grey d. 1648 | Thomas Grey; 1575–1614; 15th Baron Grey de Wilton | Susan Grey | Henry Grey c. 1583–1639; 8th Earl of Kent, 11th Baron Grey of Ruthyn
Barony Grey de Wilton (1st creation) extinct, 1614
Baronet of Egerton and Oulton, 1617
Roland Egerton d. 1646; 1st Baronet | Charles Longueville; 1612–1643; 12th Baron Grey de Ruthyn
John Egerton d. 1674; 2nd Baronet | Susan Longueville d. 1676; 13th Baroness Grey de Ruthyn suo jure
Viscount Longueville (1st creation), 1690
John Egerton d. 1729; 3rd Baronet | Charles Yelverton; 1657–1679; 14th Baron Grey de Ruthyn | Henry Yelverton c. 1664–1703/1704; 1st Viscount Longueville, 15th Baron Grey de Ruthyn
Earl of Sussex (5th creation), 1717
Holland Egerton c. 1689–1730; 4th Baronet | Talbot Yelverton c. 1664–1703/1704; 1st Earl of Sussex, 2nd Viscount Longueville, 16th Baron Grey de Ruthyn
Edward Egerton bef. 1721–1743/1744; 5th Baronet | Thomas Grey Egerton c. 1721–1756; 6th Baronet | George Augustus Yelverton; 1727–1758; 2nd Earl of Sussex, 3rd Viscount de Longueville, 17th Baron Grey de Ruthyn | Henry Yelverton; 1728–1799; 3rd Earl of Sussex, 4th Viscount de Longueville, 18th Baron Grey de Ruthyn
Earldom of Sussex (5th creation) and Viscountcy de Longueville (1st creation) extinct, 1799
Baron Grosvenor of Eaton in the County of Chester, 1761 Earl Gosvenor and Viscount Belgrave of Belgrave in the County of Chester, 1784 | Baron Grey de Wilton (2nd creation), 1784 Earl of Wilton and Viscount Grey de Wilton, 1801
Richard Grosvenor; 1731–1802; 7th Baronet of Eaton, 1st Earl Grosvenor, Viscount Belgrave, and Baron Grosvenor | Thomas Egerton; 1749–1814; 7th Baronet of Egerton and Oulton, 1st Earl of Wilton, Viscount Grey de Wilton, and Baron Grey de Wilton | Barbara Yelverton d. 1781
Barony Grey de Wilton (2nd creation) extinct, 1784
Marquess of Westminster, 1831
Robert Grosvenor; 1767–1845; 1st Marquess of Westminster, 2nd Earl Grosvenor, Viscount Belgrave, and Baron Grosvenor | Eleanor Egerton; 1770–1846 | Henry Yelverton; 1780–1810; 19th Baron Grey de Ruthyn
Baron Ebury of Ebury Manor in the County of Middlesex, 1857
Richard Grosvenor; 1795–1869; 2nd Marquess of Westminster, 3rd Earl Grosvenor, Viscount Belgrave, and Baron Grosvenor | Thomas Grosvenor (Egerton); 1799–1882; 2nd Earl of Wilton and Viscount Grey de Wilton | Robert Grosvenor; 1801–1893; 1st Baron Ebury | Barbara Rawdon-Hastings; 1810–1858; 20th Baroness Grey de Ruthyn suo jure | George Augustus Francis Rawdon-Hastings; 1808–1844; Marquess of Hastings
Duke of Westminster, 1874 | Baron Stalbridge of Stalbridge in the County of Dorset, 1886 | Baron Grey de Radcliffe in the County Palatine of Lancaster, 1875 | Barony Grey de Ruthin (Ruthyn) abeyance terminated, 1885
Hugh Lupus Grosvenor; 1825–1899; 1st Duke of Westminster, 3rd Marquess of Westminster, 4th Earl Grosvenor, Viscount Belgrave, and Baron Grosvenor | Richard de Aquila Grosvenor; 1837–1912; 1st Baron Stalbridge | Arthur Edward Holland Grey Egerton; 1833–1885; 3rd Earl of Wilton and Viscount Grey de Wilton, Baron Grey de Radcliffe | Seymour John Grey Egerton; 1839–1898; 4th Earl of Wilton and Viscount Grey de Wilton | Robert Wellesley Grosvenor; 1834–1918; 2nd Baron Ebury | Bertha Lelgarde Clifton; 1835–1887; 22nd Baroness Grey de Ruthyn suo jure | Henry Weysford Charles Plantagenet Rawdon-Hastings; 1842–1868; Marquess of Hastings, Earl of Loudoun, 21st Baron Grey de Ruthyn, Baron Botreaux, Baron Hungerford, Baron de Moleyns, Baron Hastings
Barony Grey de Radcliffe extinct, 1885 | Barony Grey de Ruthyn abeyant, 1868
Victor Alexander Grosvenor; 1853–1884 styled Earl Grosvenor | Henry George Grosvenor; 1861–1914 | Hugh Grosvenor; 1880–1949; 2nd Baron Stalbridge | Arthur George Egerton; 1863–1915; 5th Earl of Wilton and Viscount Grey de Wilton | Robert Victor Grosvenor; 1868–1921; 3rd Baron Ebury | Ella Cicely Mary Clifton; 1856–1912 | Rawdon George Grey Clifton; 1858–1912; 23rd Baron Grey de Ruthyn | Cecil Talbot Clifton; 1862–1934; 24th Baron Grey de Ruthyn
Barony Stalbridge extinct, 1949 | Barony Grey de Ruthyn abeyant, 1934
Barony Grey de Ruthyn abeyance terminated, 1940
Hugh Richard Arthur Grosvenor; 1879–1953; 2nd Duke of Westminster, 4th Marquess of Westminster, 5th Earl Grosvenor, Viscount Belgrave, and Baron Grosvenor | William Grosvenor; 1894–1963; 3rd Duke of Westminster, 5th Marquess of Westminster, 6th Earl Grosvenor, Viscount Belgrave, and Baron Grosvenor | Hugh William Grosvenor; 1884–1914 | Seymour Edward Frederick Egerton; 1896–1927; 6th Earl of Wilton and Viscount Grey de Wilton | Francis Egerton Grosvenor; 1883–1932; 4th Baron Ebury | John Lancelot Wykeham Butler-Bowden; 1883–1963; 25th Baron Grey de Ruthyn
Barony Grey de Ruthyn abeyant, 1963
Gerald Hugh Grosvenor; 1907–1967; 4th Duke of Westminster, 6th Marquess of Westminster, 7th Earl Grosvenor, Viscount Belgrave, and Baron Grosvenor | Robert George Grosvenor; 1910–1979; 5th Duke of Westminster, 7th Marquess of Westminster, 8th Earl Grosvenor, Viscount Belgrave, and Baron Grosvenor | Seymour William Arthur John Egerton; 1921–1999; 7th Earl of Wilton and Viscount Grey de Wilton | Robert Grosvenor; 1914–1957; 5th Baron Ebury
Francis Grosvenor b. 1934; 8th Earl of Wilton and Viscount Grey de Wilton, 6th Baron Ebury heir presumptive to the Marquessate of Westminster
Gerald Cavendish Grosvenor; 1951–2016; 6th Duke of Westminster, 8th Marquess of Westminster, 9th Earl Grosvenor, Viscount Belgrave, and Baron Grosvenor | Julian Grosvenor b. 1959 styled Viscount Grey de Wilton
Heir apparent to the 8th Earldom of Wilton
Hugh Grosvenor b. 1991; 7th Duke of Westminster, 9th Marquess of Westminster, 10th Earl Grosvenor, Viscount Belgrave, and Baron Grosvenor

== See also ==
- Duke of Westminster
- Earl of Wilton
- Baron Ebury
