= Grosvenor Group =

British property corporation

Grosvenor Group Limited
- Type: Family-owned private limited company
- Industry: Real estate
- Founded: 1677; 349 years ago
- Founder: Sir Thomas Grosvenor, 3rd Baronet
- Headquarters: 70 Grosvenor Street, London W1K 3JP, United Kingdom
- Area served: Worldwide
- Key people: Hugh Grosvenor, 7th Duke of Westminster (Chair); Mark Preston, FRICS (CEO); Robert Davies, FCA (CFO)
- Products: Property, residential, real estate services, hotels, offices and shopping centres
- Revenue: ▲US$1.2 billion (2017)
- Operating income: ▲US$622.3 million (2017)
- AUM: ▲US$36.7 billion (2019)
- Total assets: ▲US$63.7 billion (2017)
- Owner: Hugh Grosvenor, 7th Duke of Westminster, and family
- Number of employees: 10,800 (2016)
- Parent: Grosvenor Estate
- Subsidiaries: Grosvenor Britain & Ireland; Grosvenor Americas; Grosvenor Europe; Grosvenor Asia Pacific; Grosvenor Fund Management
- Website: Grosvenor.com; GrosvenorEstate.com

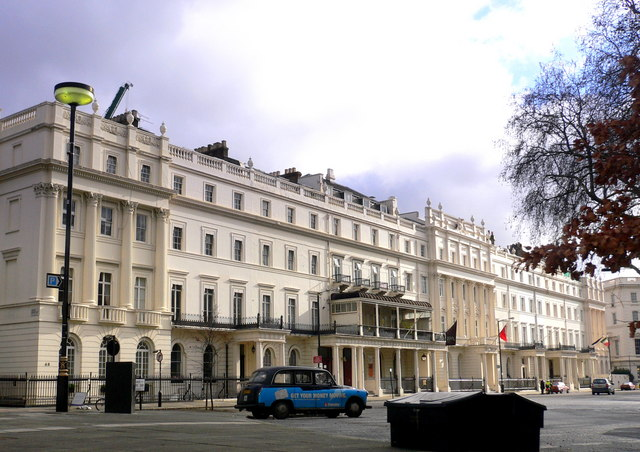
Belgrave Square, Belgravia, one of the most prestigious addresses within the Grosvenor Estate.

Grosvenor Group Limited is an internationally diversified property group, which traces its origins to 1677 and has its headquarters in London, England. Previously (from 1841) based at 66–68 Brook Street & 53 Davies Street, it is now based at 70 Grosvenor Street.

It has a global reach, now in 62 international cities, with offices in 14 of them, operated on behalf of its owners, the Duke of Westminster and his family. It has four regional development and investment businesses (Britain and Ireland, the Americas, Europe, and Asia Pacific) and a portfolio of indirect investments. Its sectors include residential, office, retail, industrial, along with hotels.

== Grosvenor Estate ==
The history of the Grosvenor Estate begins in 1677, with the marriage of 12 year-old heiress Mary Davies to Sir Thomas Grosvenor, 3rd Baronet (1656–1700). Mary had inherited the manor of Ebury, 500 acres of land north of the Thames to the west of the City of London. This area remained largely untouched by the Grosvenors until the 1720s, when they developed the northern part, now known as Mayfair, around Grosvenor Square. A few generations later, in the 1820s, their focus moved south, to what is now Belgravia, developing Eaton Square, Chester Square, and other famous addresses. Later in the 19th century, the area of Pimlico was developed; this was sold in 1953.

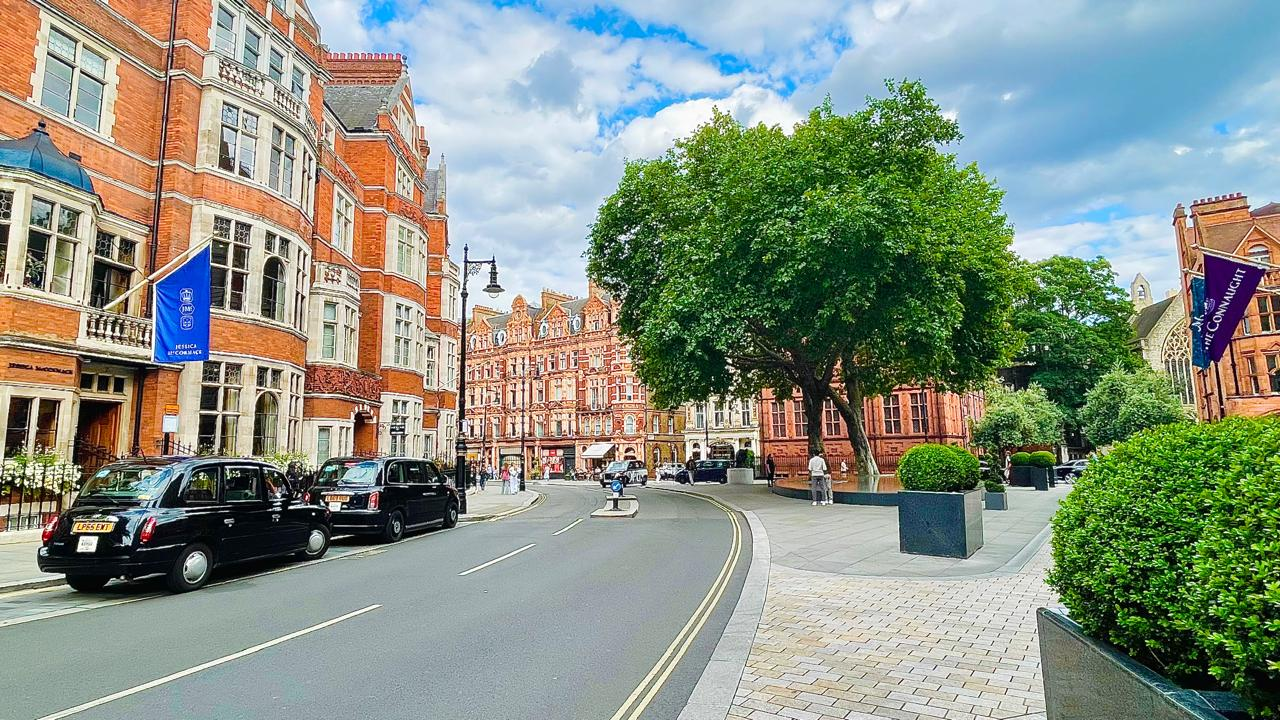
Mount Street in Central Mayfair showing Carlos Place, the Connaught hotel and the Tadao Ando fountain 'Silence'

=== Nomenclature ===
Many of the streets within the estate are named after the Grosvenor family and its connections. The Grosvenor family became established in England before the 15th century, on the manor of Eaton in Cheshire, where its principal seat, Eaton Hall, is still located. Many of the family's early members sat as one of the two Members of Parliament for Chester.

In 1874, Hugh Grosvenor was created Duke of Westminster; other titles held by the current duke are: Marquess of Westminster, Earl Grosvenor, Viscount Belgrave, and Baron Grosvenor. The title of Baron Ebury was granted in 1857 to Robert Grosvenor, third son of Robert Grosvenor, 1st Marquess of Westminster, after the name of the original manor of Ebury (whence Ebury Street, etc. in Pimlico), and Thomas Grosvenor, the second son of the 1st Marquess, who succeeded his maternal grandfather under special remainder in 1814 to the title of Earl of Wilton (whence Wilton Crescent etc. in Belgravia). "The Cheshire villages of Lupus, Eccleston and Belgrave, within or near the family estate, are recognised in street names of the London estate."

=== Buildings ===
The Mayfair portion of the estate includes Peabody social housing around Brown Hart Gardens.

== International expansion ==
Although the Grosvenor Group is often publicly identified with its core asset, the Grosvenor Estate in London, now managed within Grosvenor Britain & Ireland, the present-day investment and development portfolio of Grosvenor Group is diversified across Britain. International expansion began in the 1950s, in Canada, and later in the United States, hence businesses in the Americas.

In the 1960s, the businesses expanded into Australia and, in the 1990s, into Asia Pacific. Also in the 1990s, Grosvenor expanded into Continental Europe, where most current activity relates to Grosvenor's fund management business. This was formally established in 2005 and now encompasses the Americas, Asia Pacific (including Australia), and Europe (including the UK).

== Properties owned by Grosvenor ==
Properties in the UK, Continental Europe, Asia, and the Americas include:

- Liverpool One, a shopping district in Liverpool, UK
- District, an urban mixed-use residential and retail development in Washington, D.C., United States
- Century Plaza II, a 99,126 square ft class A office building in Silicon Valley, California, United States
- Waterstone Apartment Homes, a 432-unit community in Silicon Valley, San Jose, California, United States
- 240 Stockton Street, a ten-storey luxury retail and office building located in San Francisco, California, United States
- 875 California Street, a condominium building in San Francisco, California, United States
- 288 Pacific, a retail in Jackson Square, San Francisco, California, United States
- 394 Pacific Avenue, an office building located in San Francisco, California, United States
- 1645 Pacific Avenue, a luxury condominium building in San Francisco, California, United States
- 185 Post Street, a luxury shopping centre in San Francisco, California, United States
- Grosvenor Ambleside, a multi-tower site with retail in West Vancouver, British Columbia, Canada
- Connaught, a mixed-use building in Edgemont Village in North Vancouver, British Columbia, Canada
- The RISE, a luxury apartment building and with ground-level retail in Vancouver, British Columbia, Canada
- Drake, a collection of 135 condominiums and townhomes in Calgary, Alberta, Canada
- Haninge Centrum, a shopping mall in Stockholm, Sweden
- Väsby Centrum, a shopping mall in Stockholm, Sweden
- Burlöv Centrum, a shopping mall in Malmö, Sweden
- Rue de la Republique, a community and shopping district in Lyon, France
- Rue Serpenoise, a shopping retail complex buildings in Metz, France
- The Westminster Terrace, a 59 floors luxury apartment building in Hong Kong
- China Merchants Tower, an office building in Beijing, China
- Parkside Plaza, a shopping mall in Shanghai, China
- Grosvenor Place Kamizono-cho, a luxury residential development in Tokyo, Japan
- The Westminster Roppongi, a luxury apartment building in Tokyo, Japan
- The Westminster Nanpeidai, a luxury condominium building in Shibuya, Tokyo, Japan
- F1RST, an urban mixed-use residential and retail development across the street from Nationals Park in Washington, D.C.
- Central, an award-winning mixed-use apartment building in Silver Spring, Maryland
- Reay Forest, a deer forest in Sutherland, Scotland
- Abbeystead Estate, Forest of Bowland, Lancashire, England.

== See also ==
Other large privately owned historic estates in London include:

- Bedford Estate (Bloomsbury)
- Cadogan Estates (Chelsea)
- Howard de Walden Estate (Marylebone)
- Kingston House Estate (Knightsbridge)
- Pettiward Estate (Putney and West Brompton)
- Portman Estate (Marylebone)
- Smith's Charity Estate (South Kensington)
