= Hugh Audley =

Hugh Audley (baptised 13 January 1577 – 15 November 1662), also known as The Great Audley, was an English moneylender, lawyer and philosopher. Following his death, he was the feature of a popular 17th-century pamphlet titled The way to be rich according to the practice of the Great Audley, which compared his humble beginnings to his ultimate fortune. He is the original purchaser of Grosvenor Estate which has passed to his heirs and is the source of the Duke of Westminster's billion pound fortune.

== Life ==
The first recorded date of Audley's life is his baptism in January 1577. He was the tenth of eleven children of John Audley, a mercer, and his wife Maudlin or Margaret Hare, daughter of a wealthy Cheapside mercer named John Hare. His father died in 1579, and left "considerable property, both real and personal". After being admitted to the Inner Temple in 1603, he became a clerk of the Court of Wards and Liveries, a position for which he allegedly paid £3000, until it was abolished in 1660. In his position, he became extremely rich, and survived a £100,000 loss after the court's suppression in 1646. However, all the money and records remained in his possession long after this event.

== Estates ==
Through his wealth, Audley was able to buy and invest in land. He bought the manor of Ebury, in Westminster, from Lionel Cranfield, the first Earl of Middlesex. Deeply in debt, the Earl sold it cheaply, but had a negative opinion of Audley himself, whom he described as "barbarous", with "looks [that] show his disposition", and one who bore himself "loftily respectless and peremptory". The property later passed through his great-grandniece, Mary Davies, wife of Sir Thomas Grosvenor. Her inheritance enriched the Grosvenor family through one of Audley's legacies, which still present today: Audley Street, running through the old Ebury estate in Mayfair, is named after Hugh. On another occasion, when he bought land in Buckenham, Norfolk, Audley withheld the payments promised and harassed the creditors with law suits. His cunning was revealed and condemned by William Hone, who described an incident with a draper with a £200 debt. Audley bought the debt, for which the draper offered him £50; but Audley refused. Instead, he forced the draper to sign a contract ordering him to pay a penny, doubled every month, for twenty years, which gradually accumulated into more than the actual debt. According to the anonymous and posthumous pamphlet, Audley had "the clue of a resolved mind, which made plaine [sic] to him all the rough passages he met with".

== Death ==
Audley died in his 86th year, at the home of the rector of St. Clement Danes, London, on 15 November 1662. On 21 November, his body was interred in the Temple Church in London.
