= Richard Longfield, 1st Viscount Longueville =

Richard Longfield, 1st Viscount Longueville (1734–1811) was an Irish Member of Parliament and later a peer.

He was High Sheriff of County Cork in 1758–61. He sat in the Irish House of Commons for Charleville in County Cork (1761–68), and for Cork City (1776–83). In 1783 he was declared not duly elected. He sat for Baltimore, County Cork (1783–1790) before regaining the Cork City seat (1790–96).

Longfield was granted two titles in the Peerage of Ireland. On 1 October 1795, was created Baron Longueville, of Longueville in the County of Cork and on 29 December 1800, he was created Viscount Longueville some months after the extinction of that title in the Peerage of England. Following the implementation of the Acts of Union 1800 he was elected as one of the original 28 Irish representative peers and took his seat in the House of Lords. Both his titles became extinct on his death in 1811.

Peerage of Ireland
New creation	Viscount Longueville; 1800–1811	Extinct
New creation	Baron Longueville; 1795–1811	Extinct
Parliament of the United Kingdom
New title	Representative peer for Ireland; 1800–1811	Succeeded by The Earl of Gosford
