= Baron Ebury =

Title in the Peerage of the United Kingdom

Barony of Ebury
- Arms of the Barons Ebury (pre 1999); Arms: Azure, a Garb Or, a Mullet for difference. Crest: A Talbot statant Or. Supporters: On either side a Talbot reguardant Or, collared Azure, and charged on the shoulder with a Mullet Azure, for difference.
- Creation date: 15 September 1857
- Created by: Queen Victoria
- Peerage: Peerage of the United Kingdom
- First holder: Lord Robert Grosvenor
- Present holder: Julian Grosvenor, 9th Earl of Wilton
- Heir presumptive: Alexander Grosvenor
- Status: Extant
- Former seat: Moor Park
- Motto: VIRTUS NON STEMMA (Virtue, not ancestry)
- Note: since 1999, Baron Ebury has been a subsidiary title of the earldom of Wilton

Baron Ebury, of Ebury Manor in the County of Middlesex, is a title in the Peerage of the United Kingdom that dates from 1857. In 1999, it became a subsidiary title of the earldom of Wilton after the 6th Baron Ebury inherited the earldom from his distant cousin, the 7th Earl of Wilton.

== History ==
The peerage was created in September 1857 for the Whig politician Lord Robert Grosvenor. He was the third son of Robert Grosvenor, 1st Marquess of Westminster, and his wife Lady Eleanor Egerton, daughter of Thomas Egerton, 1st Earl of Wilton.

Both Lord Robert and his elder brother Lord Thomas were in special remainder to the viscountcy of Grey de Wilton and the earldom of Wilton, created for their maternal grandfather in 1801. Upon the latter's death in 1814, Lord Thomas succeeded as second Earl of Wilton.

Lord Ebury was succeeded by his eldest son, the second Baron. He represented Westminster in Parliament as a Liberal. His grandson, the fifth Baron, served as a government whip from 1939 to 1940 in the government of Neville Chamberlain. In 1999, his eldest son, the sixth Baron, succeeded as eighth Earl of Wilton on the death of his kinsman, the seventh Earl.

The Honourable Norman Grosvenor, younger son of the first Baron, sat as Member of Parliament for Chester.

== Barons Ebury (1857) ==
- Robert Grosvenor, 1st Baron Ebury (1801–1893)
- Robert Wellesley Grosvenor, 2nd Baron Ebury (1834–1918)
- Robert Victor Grosvenor, 3rd Baron Ebury (1868–1921)
- Francis Egerton Grosvenor, 4th Baron Ebury (1883–1932)
- Robert Egerton Grosvenor, 5th Baron Ebury (1914–1957)
- Francis Egerton Grosvenor, 8th Earl of Wilton, 6th Baron Ebury (1934-2026)
- Julian Grosvenor, 9th Earl of Wilton, 7th Baron Ebury (b. 1959)

For further barons, see Earl of Wilton.

== Family tree ==
Grosvenor and Grey family tree: Dukes of Westminster, Marquesses of Westminster
Earls: Grosvenor, Sussex (5th creation), and of Wilton
Viscounts: Belgrave, Grey de Wilton, and de Longueville and
Barons: Grey de Wilton, Grey of Ruthin (Ruthyn), Grey de Radcliffe, Ebury, Grosvenor, and Stalbridge

Baron Grey de Wilton (1st creation), 1285
Reginald Grey d. 1308; 1st Baron Grey de Wilton
John Grey c. 1268–1323; 2nd Baron Grey de Wilton
Baron Grey of Ruthin, 1324
Henry Grey; 1281–1342; 3rd Baron Grey de Wilton	Roger Grey d. 1352/1353; 1st Baron Grey of Ruthin	King Edward III; 1312–1377
Reynold Grey; 1311–1370; 4th Baron Grey de Wilton	Reynold Grey c. 1322 – c. 1388; 2nd Baron Grey of Ruthin	John of Gaunt; 1340–1399	Thomas Holland; Earl of Kent c. 1314–1360
Henry Grey c. 1340–1396; 5th Baron Grey de Wilton	Reynold Grey c. 1362 – c. 1440; 3rd Baron Grey of Ruthin	Elizabeth of Lancaster bef. 1363–1426	John Holland; Earl of Huntingdon; Duke of Exeter c. 1352–1400
Richard Grey c. 1393–1442; 6th Baron Grey de Wilton	John Grey c. 1387–1439	Constance Holland; 1387–1437
Reynold Grey c. 1421–1493/94; 7th Baron Grey de Wilton	Edmund Grey c. 1362 – c. 1440; 1st Earl of Kent, 4th Baron Grey of Ruthin	See Template:Dukes of Kent family tree
Edmund Grey d. 1499; 8th Baron Grey de Wilton	George Grey; 2nd Earl of Kent, 5th Baron Grey of Ruthin c. 1460–1503
Edmund Grey c. 1469–1511; 9th Baron Grey de Wilton	Richard Grey; 3rd Earl of Kent, 6th Baron Grey of Ruthin; 1481–1524	Henry Grey; 4th Earl of Kent, 7th Baron Grey of Ruthin c. 1495–1562
George Grey c. 1493–1514/1515; 10th Baron Grey de Wilton	Thomas Grey c. 1496–1517; 11th Baron Grey de Wilton	Richard Grey c. 1505–1523; 12th Baron Grey de Wilton	William Grey c. 1509–1562; 13th Baron Grey de Wilton	Henry Grey; 1520–1545
Arthur Grey; 1536–1593; 14th Baron Grey de Wilton	Reginald Grey d. 1573; 5th Earl of Kent, 8th Baron Grey of Ruthin	Henry Grey; 1541–1615; 6th Earl of Kent, 9th Baron Grey of Ruthin	Charles Grey c. 1545–1623; 7th Earl of Kent, 10th Baron Grey of Ruthyn
Bridget Grey d. 1648	Thomas Grey; 1575–1614; 15th Baron Grey de Wilton	Susan Grey	Henry Grey c. 1583–1639; 8th Earl of Kent, 11th Baron Grey of Ruthyn
Barony Grey de Wilton (1st creation) extinct, 1614
Baronet of Egerton and Oulton, 1617
Roland Egerton d. 1646; 1st Baronet	Charles Longueville; 1612–1643; 12th Baron Grey de Ruthyn
John Egerton d. 1674; 2nd Baronet	Susan Longueville d. 1676; 13th Baroness Grey de Ruthyn suo jure
Viscount Longueville (1st creation), 1690
John Egerton d. 1729; 3rd Baronet	Charles Yelverton; 1657–1679; 14th Baron Grey de Ruthyn	Henry Yelverton c. 1664–1703/1704; 1st Viscount Longueville, 15th Baron Grey de Ruthyn
Earl of Sussex (5th creation), 1717
Holland Egerton c. 1689–1730; 4th Baronet	Talbot Yelverton c. 1664–1703/1704; 1st Earl of Sussex, 2nd Viscount Longueville, 16th Baron Grey de Ruthyn
Edward Egerton bef. 1721–1743/1744; 5th Baronet	Thomas Grey Egerton c. 1721–1756; 6th Baronet	George Augustus Yelverton; 1727–1758; 2nd Earl of Sussex, 3rd Viscount de Longueville, 17th Baron Grey de Ruthyn	Henry Yelverton; 1728–1799; 3rd Earl of Sussex, 4th Viscount de Longueville, 18th Baron Grey de Ruthyn
Earldom of Sussex (5th creation) and Viscountcy de Longueville (1st creation) extinct, 1799
Baron Grosvenor of Eaton in the County of Chester, 1761 Earl Gosvenor and Viscount Belgrave of Belgrave in the County of Chester, 1784	Baron Grey de Wilton (2nd creation), 1784 Earl of Wilton and Viscount Grey de Wilton, 1801
Richard Grosvenor; 1731–1802; 7th Baronet of Eaton, 1st Earl Grosvenor, etc.	Thomas Egerton; 1749–1814; 7th Baronet of Egerton and Oulton, 1st Earl of Wilton, etc.	Barbara Yelverton d. 1781
Barony Grey de Wilton (2nd creation) extinct, 1784
Marquess of Westminster, 1831
Robert Grosvenor; 1767–1845; 1st Marquess of Westminster, 2nd Earl Grosvenor, etc.	Eleanor Egerton; 1770–1846	Henry Yelverton; 1780–1810; 19th Baron Grey de Ruthyn
Baron Ebury of Ebury Manor in the County of Middlesex, 1857
Richard Grosvenor; 1795–1869; 2nd Marquess of Westminster, 3rd Earl Grosvenor, etc.	Thomas Grosvenor (Egerton); 1799–1882; 2nd Earl of Wilton, etc.	Robert Grosvenor; 1801–1893; 1st Baron Ebury	Barbara Rawdon-Hastings; 1810–1858; 20th Baroness Grey de Ruthyn suo jure	George Augustus Francis Rawdon-Hastings; 1808–1844; Marquess of Hastings
Duke of Westminster, 1874	Baron Stalbridge of Stalbridge in the County of Dorset, 1886	Baron Grey de Radcliffe in the County Palatine of Lancaster, 1875	Barony Grey de Ruthin (Ruthyn) abeyance terminated, 1885
Hugh Lupus Grosvenor; 1825–1899; 1st Duke of Westminster, 3rd Marquess of Westminster, 4th Earl Grosvenor, etc.	Richard de Aquila Grosvenor; 1837–1912; 1st Baron Stalbridge	Arthur Edward Holland Grey Egerton; 1833–1885; 3rd Earl of Wilton, etc., Baron Grey de Radcliffe	Seymour John Grey Egerton; 1839–1898; 4th Earl of Wilton, etc.	Robert Wellesley Grosvenor; 1834–1918; 2nd Baron Ebury	Bertha Lelgarde Clifton; 1835–1887; 22nd Baroness Grey de Ruthyn suo jure	Henry Weysford Charles Plantagenet Rawdon-Hastings; 1842–1868; Marquess of Hastings, Earl of Loudoun, 21st Baron Grey de Ruthyn, Baron Botreaux, Baron Hungerford, Baron de Moleyns, Baron Hastings
Barony Grey de Radcliffe extinct, 1885	Barony Grey de Ruthyn abeyant, 1868
Victor Alexander Grosvenor; 1853–1884 styled Earl Grosvenor	Henry George Grosvenor; 1861–1914	Hugh Grosvenor; 1880–1949; 2nd Baron Stalbridge	Arthur George Egerton; 1863–1915; 5th Earl of Wilton, etc.	Robert Victor Grosvenor; 1868–1921; 3rd Baron Ebury	Ella Cicely Mary Clifton; 1856–1912	Rawdon George Grey Clifton; 1858–1912; 23rd Baron Grey de Ruthyn	Cecil Talbot Clifton; 1862–1934; 24th Baron Grey de Ruthyn
Barony Stalbridge extinct, 1949	Barony Grey de Ruthyn abeyant, 1934
Barony Grey de Ruthyn abeyance terminated, 1940
Hugh Richard Arthur Grosvenor; 1879–1953; 2nd Duke of Westminster, 4th Marquess of Westminster, 5th Earl Grosvenor, etc.	William Grosvenor; 1894–1963; 3rd Duke of Westminster, 5th Marquess of Westminster, 6th Earl Grosvenor, etc.	Hugh William Grosvenor; 1884–1914	Seymour Edward Frederick Egerton; 1896–1927; 6th Earl of Wilton, etc.	Francis Egerton Grosvenor; 1883–1932; 4th Baron Ebury	John Lancelot Wykeham Butler-Bowden; 1883–1963; 25th Baron Grey de Ruthyn
Barony Grey de Ruthyn abeyant, 1963
Gerald Hugh Grosvenor; 1907–1967; 4th Duke of Westminster, 6th Marquess of Westminster, 7th Earl Grosvenor, etc.	Robert George Grosvenor; 1910–1979; 5th Duke of Westminster, 7th Marquess of Westminster, 8th Earl Grosvenor, etc.	Seymour William Arthur John Egerton; 1921–1999; 7th Earl of Wilton, etc.	Robert Grosvenor; 1914–1957; 5th Baron Ebury
Francis Grosvenor; 1934–2026; 8th Earl of Wilton, etc., 6th Baron Ebury	William Wellesley Grosvenor; 1942–2002
Gerald Cavendish Grosvenor; 1951–2016; 6th Duke of Westminster, 8th Marquess of Westminster, 9th Earl Grosvenor, etc.	Julian Francis Martin Grosvenor b. 1959; 9th Earl of Wilton, etc., 7th Baron Ebury	Alexander Egerton Grosvenor b. 1968
Heir presumptive to the Marquessate of Westminster	Heir presumtive to the Earldom of Wilton
Hugh Grosvenor b. 1991; 7th Duke of Westminster, 9th Marquess of Westminster, 10th Earl Grosvenor, etc.
There is, as yet, no heir to the dukedom of Westminister

== See also ==
- Duke of Westminster
- Baron Grey de Wilton
- Baron Stalbridge
