= Seymour Egerton, 4th Earl of Wilton =

British peer (1839-1898)

Seymour Egerton in the 1860s, standing between Frederic Clay on the left and Arthur Sullivan on the right

Seymour John Grey "Sim" Egerton, 4th Earl of Wilton (20 January 1839 – 3 January 1898) was a peer of the United Kingdom from the Egerton family.

He was the owner and namesake of the Lord Wilton violin. A musician, he was an associate of Arthur Sullivan, of Gilbert and Sullivan. His wife Laura Caroline (1842–1916), daughter of William Russell (son of Lord William Russell) and Emma Campbell (daughter of John Campbell and Lady Charlotte Campbell), was a noted beauty in the contemporary society scene. They married on 9 August 1862 and had two children, Arthur George Egerton, 5th Earl of Wilton (1863–1915), and Elizabeth Emma Geraldine Egerton (1865–1953). After his death, in 1899, his wife married Sir Frederick John William Johnstone.

His elder brother was Arthur Egerton, 3rd Earl of Wilton. His father was Thomas Egerton, 2nd Earl of Wilton (1799–1882) and his mother was Lady Mary Margaret Stanley, daughter of Edward Smith-Stanley, 12th Earl of Derby. His paternal grandfather was Robert Grosvenor, 1st Marquess of Westminster.

Peerage of the United Kingdom
| Preceded by Arthur Egerton | Earl of Wilton; 1885–1898 | Succeeded by Arthur George Egerton |
