= Eia =

Former medieval manor in Middlesex, England

Coordinates: 51°30′29″N 0°09′47″W

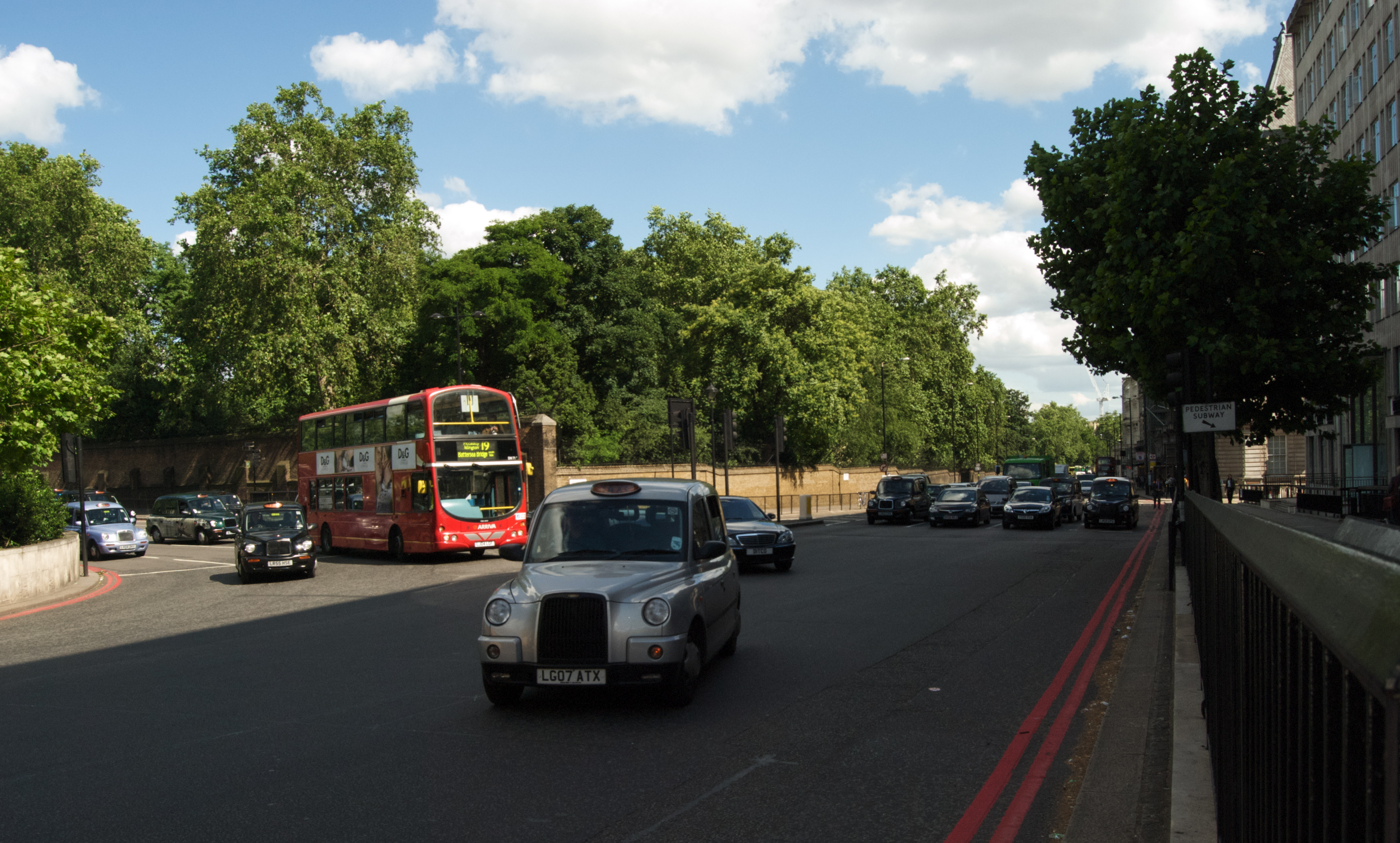
Part of the former manor of Eia, in Grosvenor Place, Belgravia; the grounds of Buckingham Palace are in the centre background.

Eia or Eye was an early medieval manor in Westminster, Middlesex. It was about one mile west of the Palace of Westminster/Whitehall, about 2 miles west-south-west of the walled City of London, and about half a mile north of the River Thames.

The area of the manor later became the site of Hyde Park (which dates from 1536), the grounds of Buckingham Palace (1703), Belgravia, Park Lane and most parts of Mayfair, Pimlico, and Knightsbridge.

== Etymology ==
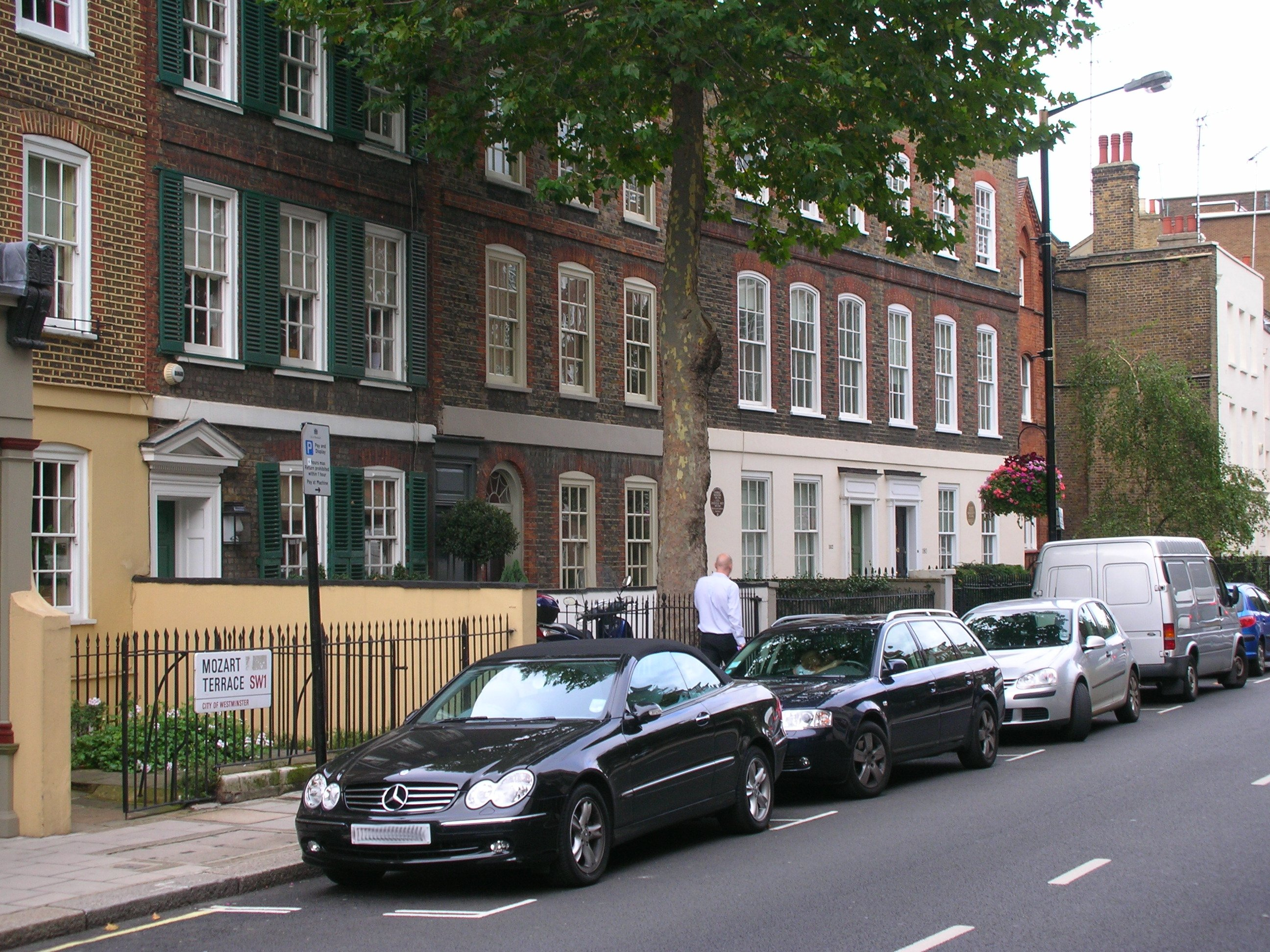
Ebury Street, Belgravia. This part of the street has been renamed Mozart Terrace after the composer Wolfgang Mozart, who in 1764 stayed at the house to the left of the lamp post and composed his first symphony there.

The name Eia is believed to have originated as a Latinisation of the Anglo-Saxon word īeg, which means "island", in reference to a rise along a stream/marsh. It may have referred to an area known later as Thorney Island, surrounding Westminster Abbey, and formed by the River Tyburn.

A smaller sub-manor called Ebury or Eybury, containing the hamlet Eye Cross, was originally part of the manor (and are derivations in name). Ebury and a corruption of it, Avery, appear as modern place and street names.

=== Ebury in modern place and other names ===
Ebury survives as a place name in: Ebury Street, Belgravia, Ebury Square, Ebury Wharf and Ebury Bridge, which crosses the former Grosvenor Canal. The name Avery, also found in many street names in SW1, is a corruption of Ebury.

The modern hereditary title Baron Ebury, was created in 1857 for Robert Grosvenor, the owner of the estate, of an ancient and prominent gentry family of Cheshire. The names of some of the family's Cheshire estates now feature as street names in the former manor of Ebury, most notably Eaton, Belgrave and Eccleston. One of Grosvenor's business enterprises was the Watford and Rickmansworth Railway, also known as the "Ebury Line", in Hertfordshire. The railway no longer exists and has been converted into the Ebury Way hiking trail.

Ebury Publishing has its offices in Pimlico.

== Middle Ages ==
Eia was a rural manor during the early medieval period, on land adjacent to the River Tyburn (a reduced catchment form of which flows beneath the courtyard and south wing of Buckingham Palace), immediately west and north of Thorney Island, on the Thames, which became the site of Westminster Abbey.

Ownership of the site changed hands many times in the Middle Ages. Its owners included Edward the Confessor and his queen consort Edith of Wessex in late Saxon times. After the Norman Conquest, William the Conqueror gave the site to Geoffrey de Mandeville, who bequeathed it to the monks of Westminster Abbey.,

At about the time of the Domesday Book of 1086, the manor of Eia was divided into three smaller manors: Hyde (the north-western part), Ebury (or Eyebury/Eia) (central area) and La Neyte or Neat (to the south-east). Neyte was a small island in the marsh (in what is now Pimlico), on which a house was built for the Abbot of Westminster. Neyte may have been the inspiration for Knightsbridge, considerably beyond the north side, which centred on a bridge over water on one of the great, Roman-founded, roads leading west-south-west from the City of London.

By the 12th century a ford crossing on the River Tyburn, before its loss known as Cow Ford, was the site of a hamlet: Eye Cross. Its location is unknown; probably it was in and/or beside the south of Buckingham Palace Gardens.

== Early modern era ==
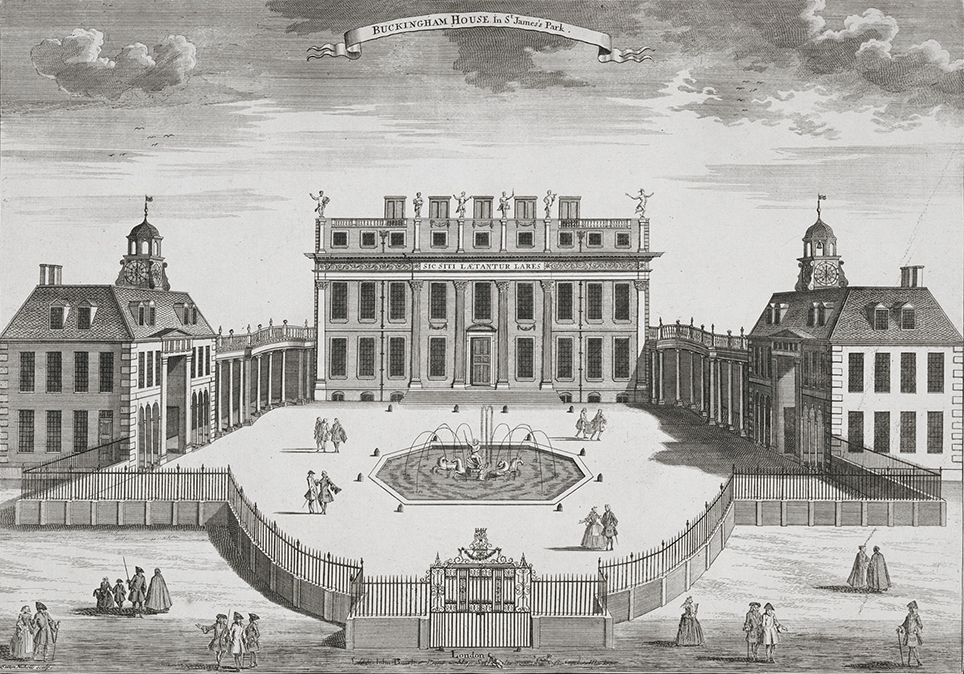
Buckingham House, the core element of today's Buckingham Palace, was built in the early eighteenth century for The 1st Duke of Buckingham and Normanby to the design of William Winde.

In 1531 King Henry VIII acquired the Hospital of St James (later St. James's Palace) from Eton College, a royal foundation founded in 1440 by King Henry VI endowed with many royal lands. In 1536, on the Dissolution of the Monasteries, the Manor of Ebury became one of the many possessions of Westminster Abbey which reverted to the Crown (which is considered the foundation of all land ownership) and the Court of Augmentations. This meant the site that would become Buckingham Palace returned to royal ownership, almost 500 years after William the Conqueror had given it away.

By the early 17th century, the lease of the manor had passed through the hands of many different people. Eye Cross had ceased to exist and the area of the former village was mostly wasteland. During the reign of King James VI and I (1603-1625), part of it was sold, freehold, (including the future site of Buckingham Palace). On the rest James established a 4-acre (16,000 m^{2}) mulberry garden (near the north-west corner of the present palace). Before 1650 Clement Walker, in his work Anarchia Anglicana, referred to "new-erected sodoms and spintries" – both terms referring to male prostitution – in "the Mulberry Garden at S. James's".

=== Development ===
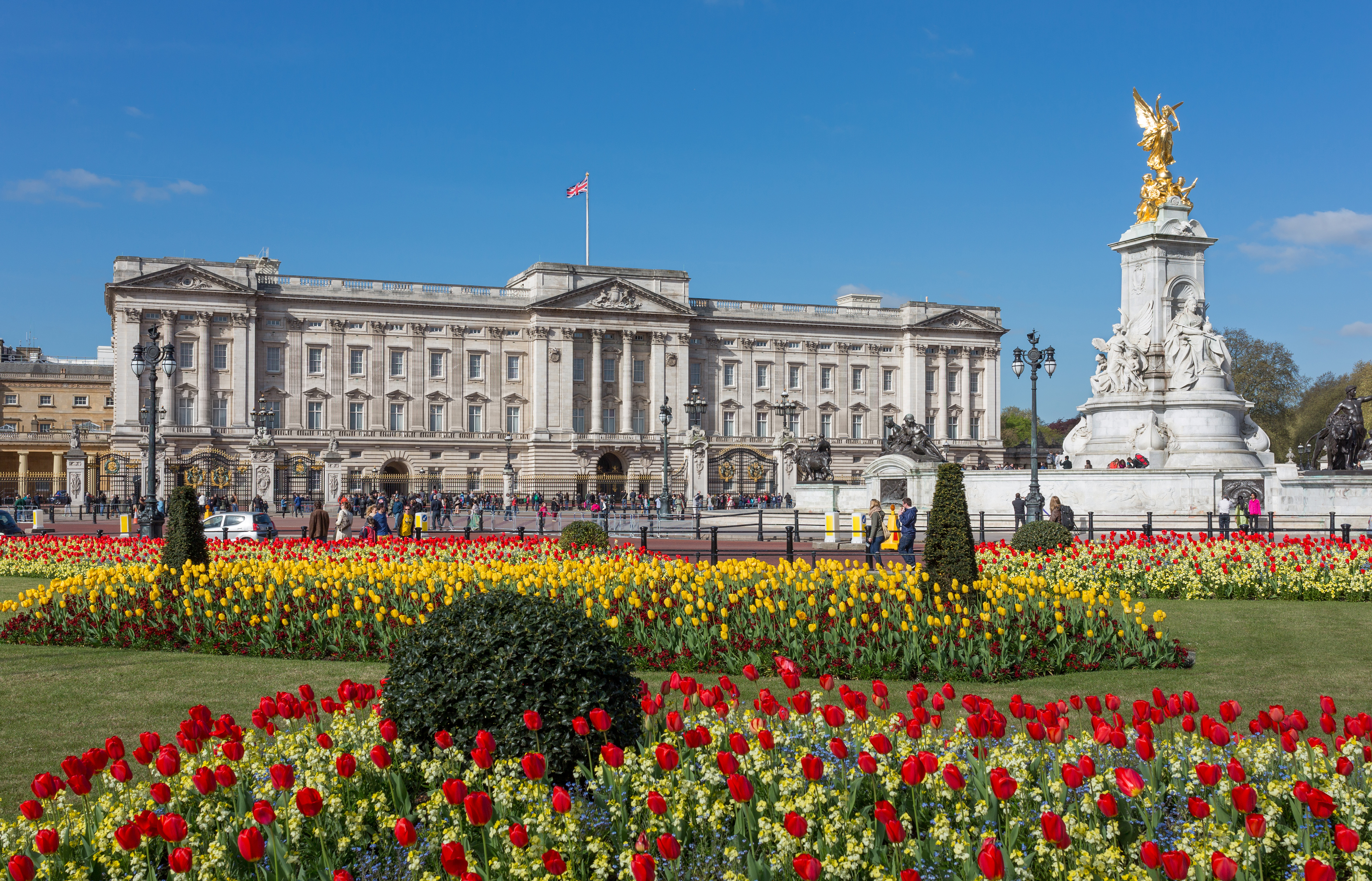
Buckingham Palace, principal façade; it was originally built to the design of Edward Blore and completed in 1850. It acquired its present appearance (shown above) following a 1913 remodelling by Sir Aston Webb.

During the late 17th century, Ebury's freehold passed from Sir Hugh Audley to his great-great-niece, Mary Davies. Audley and Davies were key figures in the development of Ebury Manor into a suburb of the City of London, now comprising Mayfair, Belgravia and Park Lane. They are commemorated by today's North Audley Street, South Audley Street and Davies Street, all in Mayfair. Much of Mary's inheritance now forms part of the Grosvenor Estate.

Buckingham House, the mansion that now forms the core of Buckingham Palace, was built in 1703 for the 1st Duke of Buckingham and Normanby to the design of William Winde. In 1761 the mansion returned to the ownership of the royal family (which had retained the adjoining site of the Mulberry Garden), when it was sold to King George III, for either £21,000 or, possibly, £28,000.

== Bibliography ==
- Charles T. Gatty, 1921, Mary Davies and the Manor of Ebury, London/New York, Cassell.
- Brian Girling, 2013, Belgravia & Knightsbridge Through Time, Stroud, Glouc., Amberley Publishing Ltd.
- O. G. Goring, 1937, From Goring House to Buckingham Palace, London, Ivor Nicholson & Watson.
- J. E. B. Gover, 1922, The Place Names of Middlesex, London, Longmans
- Roy Nash, 1980, Buckingham Palace: The Place and the People, London, Macdonald Futura.
- F. H. W. Sheppard (ed.) 1977, Survey of London 39: The Grosvenor Estate in Mayfair, Part 1 (General History), London, London County Council (12 April 2015).
- John Martin Robinson, 1999, Buckingham Palace, London, The Royal Collection.
- Patricia Wright, 2012, The Strange History of Buckingham Palace, Stroud, Gloucs., The History Press.
