= Bertha Clifton, 22nd Baroness Grey de Ruthyn =

British aristocrat (1835–1887)

The Right Honourable The Lady Grey de Ruthyn
- Born: Lady Bertha Lelgarde Rawdon-Hastings; 30 April 1835
- Died: 15 December 1887 (aged 52)
- Spouse: Augustus Wykeham Clifton (m. 1855)
- Children: 4
- Parent(s): Barbara Rawdon-Hastings, Marchioness of Hastings; George Rawdon-Hastings, 2nd Marquess of Hastings
- Relatives: Edith Rawdon-Hastings, 10th Countess of Loudoun (sister); Henry Rawdon-Hastings, 4th Marquess of Hastings (brother); Henry Yelverton, 19th Baron Grey de Ruthyn (grandfather); John Butler-Bowdon, 25th Baron Grey de Ruthyn (grandson)

Bertha Lelgarde Clifton, 22nd Baroness Grey de Ruthyn (née Rawdon-Hastings; 30 April 1835 – 15 December 1887) was a British aristocrat.

== Early life ==
Lady Bertha was born on 30 April 1835. She was the second of six children born to Barbara Rawdon-Hastings, Marchioness of Hastings, suo jure 20th Baroness Grey de Ruthyn (1810–1858) and George Rawdon-Hastings, 2nd Marquess of Hastings (1808–1844). Among her siblings were Paulyn Rawdon-Hastings, 3rd Marquess of Hastings (who died unmarried), Edith Rawdon-Hastings, 10th Countess of Loudoun (wife of Charles Abney-Hastings, 1st Baron Donington), Lady Victoria Rawdon-Hastings, Henry Rawdon-Hastings, 4th Marquess of Hastings (who married Lady Florence Paget, only daughter of Henry Paget, 2nd Marquess of Anglesey), and Lady Frances Rawdon-Hastings (wife of Charles Marsham, 4th Earl of Romney). Fifteen months after her father's death in 1844, her mother married Capt. Hastings Henry, who took the name of Yelverton by royal license in 1849. From her mother's second marriage, she had a younger half-sister, Hon. Barbara Yelverton, who married John Yarde-Buller, 2nd Baron Churston.

Her mother, who inherited the barony when only seven months old, was the only child of Henry Yelverton, 19th Baron Grey de Ruthyn (a friend of Lord Byron) and the former Anna Maria Kellam. Her paternal grandparents were Francis Rawdon-Hastings, 1st Marquess of Hastings and his wife, Flora Mure-Campbell, 6th Countess of Loudoun.

== Career ==
On the death of her younger brother Henry in November 1868, his titles created by patent (the marquessate of Hastings, the earldoms of Moira and Rawdon, the viscountcy of Loudoun and the two baronies of Rawdon) became extinct, his Scottish titles (earldom of Loudoun and the Lordships of Campbell of Loudoun and of Tarrinzean and Mauchline) passed to their eldest sister and heir of line Edith, and the English baronies (Grey of Ruthyn, Botreaux, Hungerford, de Moleyns, and Hastings) fell into abeyance between Berth and her three sisters and co-heiresses.

On 29 December 1885, the abeyance of the Barony of Grey of Ruthin, which dated back to 1324, was terminated in favour of Lady Bertha and she became, suo jure 22nd Baroness Grey of Ruthyn.

== Personal life ==
On 11 December 1855, she married Augustus Wykeham Clifton, son of Hetty (née Treves) Clifton and Thomas Joseph Clifton of Lytham Hall. His elder brother was John Talbot Clifton, MP for North Lancashire. Together, they were the parents of:

- Hon. Ella Cicely Mary Clifton (1856–1912), who married Lancelot George Butler-Bowden, son of John Butler-Bowdon of Pleasington Hall, in 1879.
- Rawdon George Grey Clifton, 23rd Baron Grey de Ruthyn (1858–1912), who married Evelyn Isobel Ida Charlotte Foster, only daughter of James Foster of Cranbourne Hall, in 1892.
- Cecil Talbot Clifton, 24th Baron Grey de Ruthyn (1862–1934), who died unmarried.
- Hon. Lelgarde Harry Florence Clifton (1870–1939), who married, as his second wife, Sir Alan Bellingham, 4th Baronet, MP for County Louth, in 1895.

Lady Grey de Ruthyn died on 15 December 1887. She was succeeded in the barony by her eldest son, Rawdon.

Peerage of England
Preceded by Henry Rawdon-Hastings	Baroness Grey de Ruthyn; 1885–1887	Succeeded by Rawdon George Grey Clifton
