= Paulyn Rawdon-Hastings, 3rd Marquess of Hastings =

British peer and officer

The Most Honourable The Marquess of Hastings
- Born: Paulyn Reginald Serlo Rawdon-Hastings; 2 June 1832
- Died: 17 January 1851 (aged 18); Dublin, Ireland
- Parent(s): George Rawdon-Hastings, 2nd Marquess of Hastings; Barbara Rawdon-Hastings, Marchioness of Hastings
- Relatives: Edith Rawdon-Hastings, 10th Countess of Loudoun (sister); Bertha Clifton, 22nd Baroness Grey de Ruthyn (sister); Henry Rawdon-Hastings, 4th Marquess of Hastings (brother)

Paulyn Reginald Serlo Rawdon-Hastings, 3rd Marquess of Hastings (2 June 1832 - 17 January 1851), styled Earl of Rawdon from birth until 1844, was a British peer and officer in the British Army.

== Early life ==
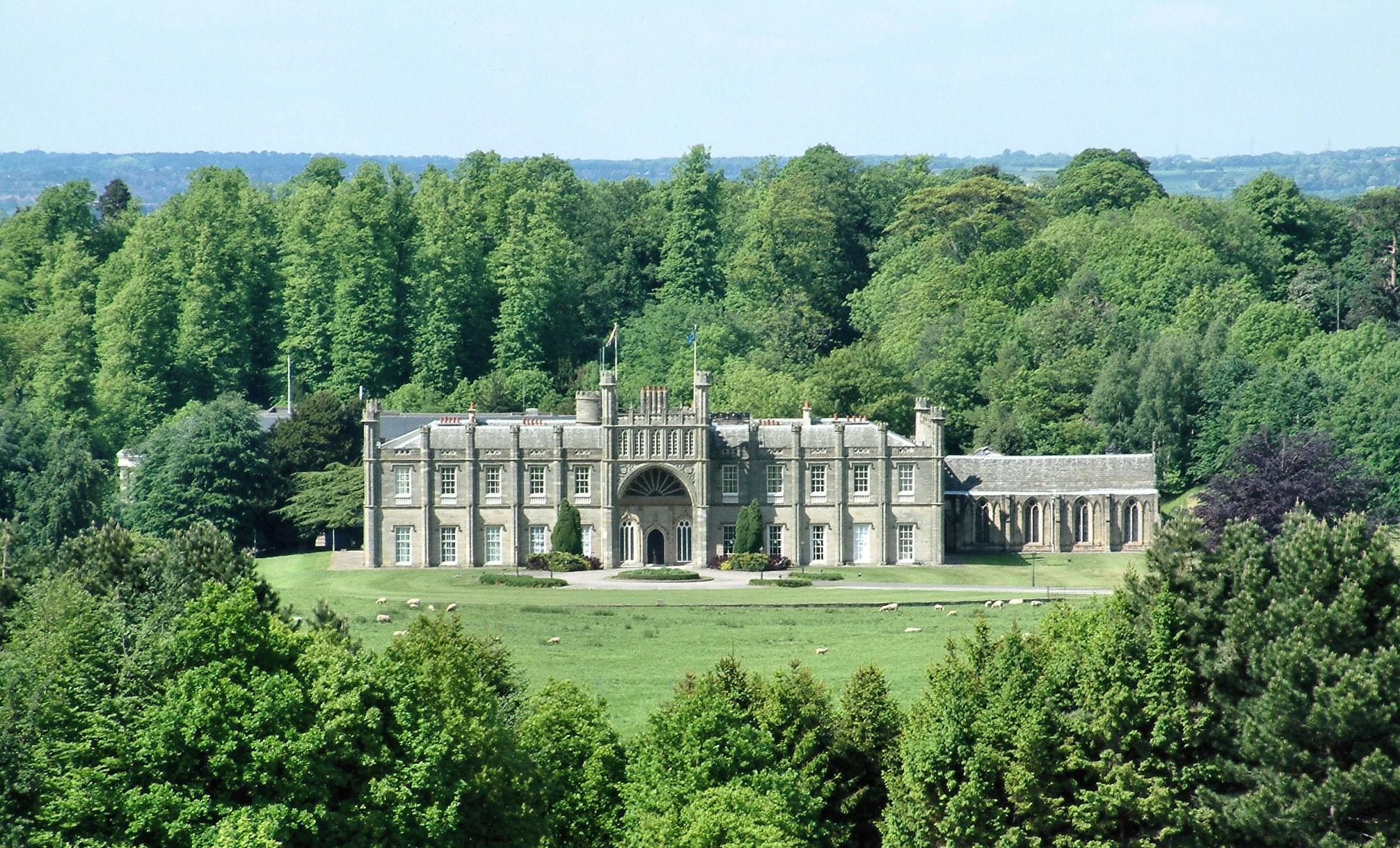
Donington Hall

Rawdon-Hastings was the eldest child of George Rawdon-Hastings, 2nd Marquess of Hastings, the British peer and courtier, and his wife Barbara née Yelverton, 20th Baroness Grey de Ruthyn. Among his younger siblings were Lady Edith Rawdon-Hastings (wife of Charles Abney-Hastings, 1st Baron Donington), Lady Bertha Rawdon-Hastings (wife of Augustus Wykeham Clifton), Lady Victoria Rawdon-Hastings, Henry Rawdon-Hastings (who married Lady Florence Paget, only daughter of Henry Paget, 2nd Marquess of Anglesey), and Lady Frances Rawdon-Hastings (wife of Charles Marsham, 4th Earl of Romney). Fifteen months after his father's death in 1844, his mother married Capt. Hastings Henry, nephew of the Duke of Leinster, who took the name of Yelverton by royal license in 1849. From his mother's second marriage, she had a younger half-sister, Hon. Barbara Yelverton, who later married John Yarde-Buller, 2nd Baron Churston.

His mother, who inherited the barony when only seven months old, was the only child of Henry Yelverton, 19th Baron Grey de Ruthyn (a friend of Lord Byron) and the former Anna Maria Kellam. His paternal grandparents were Francis Rawdon-Hastings, 1st Marquess of Hastings and his wife, Flora Mure-Campbell, 6th Countess of Loudoun.

=== Peerage ===
His father died on 13 January 1844, when Paulyn was only eleven years old, and he succeeded as the 3rd Marquess of Hastings and owner of Donington Hall, the family seat near Castle Donington village, North West Leicestershire. He also inherited several subsidiary titles becoming the 9th Lord Campbell of Loudoun, the 18th Baron Hungerford, the 16th Baron de Moleyns, the 19th Baron Botreaux, the 8th Lord Tarrinzean and Mauchline, and the 8th Earl of Loudoun.

Before his early death, Lord Hastings was commissioned an ensign in the 52nd Regiment.

== Personal life ==
While in Liverpool, Lord Hastings fell into the docks and "was not rescued until his strength was almost exhausted" which led to his death at Dawson Street in Dublin, Ireland on 17 January 1851 at age eighteen. He was interred in the family vault in the parish church of Castle Donington, which had been constructed under the supervision of his father. As he was unmarried and without issue, he was succeeded in his titles by his younger brother, Henry, who was only aged nine. Later, in 1858, Henry also inherited their mother's barony at the age of sixteen.

Peerage of the United Kingdom
Preceded by George Rawdon-Hastings	Marquess of Hastings; 1844–1851	Henry Rawdon-Hastings
Peerage of Scotland
Preceded by George Rawdon-Hastings	Earl of Loudoun; 1844–1851	Succeeded by Henry Rawdon-Hastings
Peerage of England
Preceded by George Rawdon-Hastings	Baron Hastings; Baron Botreaux; Baron Hungerford; Baron de Moleyns; 1844–1851	Succeeded by Henry Rawdon-Hastings
