= John Campbell, 1st Earl of Loudoun =

Scottish politician and Covenanter

The Right Honourable The Earl of Loudoun
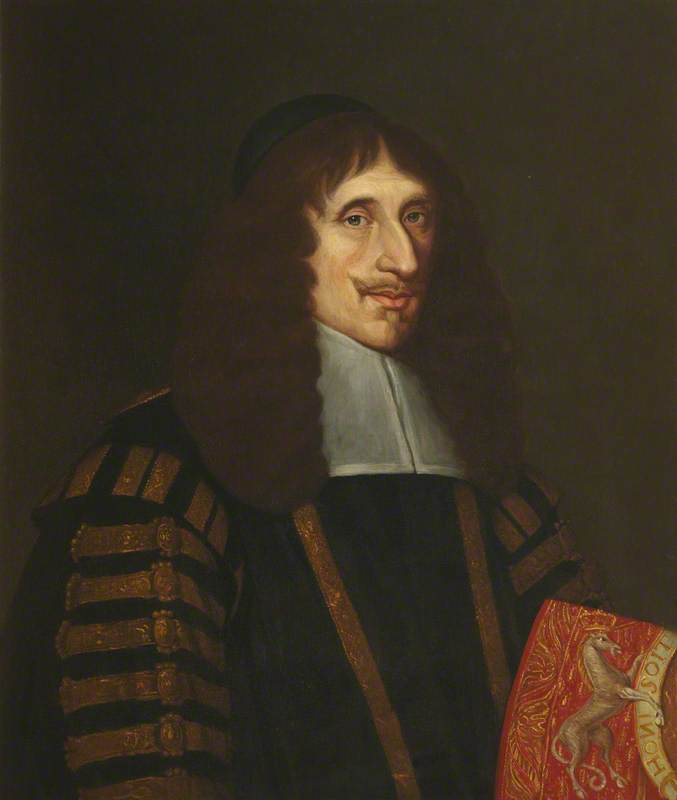
- John Campbell, 1st Earl of Loudoun

Lord Chancellor of Scotland

Personal details
- Born: John Campbell; 1598
- Died: March 1662 (aged 63–64)
- Spouse: Margaret Campbell
- Children: 4

John Campbell, 1st Earl of Loudoun (1598 – March 1662) was a Scottish politician and Covenanter.

As a young man Campbell travelled abroad. In 1620 married the heiress of the barony of Loudoun; in his wife's right, took his seat in the Parliament of Scotland. In 1622 his patent for an earldom stopped by Charles I because of his strenuous opposition to episcopacy. In 1633 he took a leading part in organising the Covenant, 1637–1638. He was a leader of the armed insurrection in Scotland in 1639 and an envoy from Scotland to Charles I in 1640. He was imprisoned in the Tower of London but was freed and joined the Scottish army of invasion in August 1640. He was sent again as an envoy to London and was made Lord Chancellor of Scotland from 1641 to 1660. In 1641 he was also created Earl of Loudoun. During the years 1642–1647 he was frequently envoy to Charles I from the Parliament of Scotland. In 1650 he was present at the coronation of Charles II of Scotland and fought at Dunbar. He joined the Highland rising of 1653, but submitted to General Monck when it became obvious that further resistance was futile. He was excepted from Cromwell's Act of Grace in 1654 and heavily fined by Charles II in 1662.

== Biography ==
Campbell, was the eldest son of Sir James Campbell of Lawers, and his wife, Jean, daughter of James, Lord Colville of Culross. He was born in 1598, and on his return from travelling abroad was knighted by James VI of Scotland.

In 1620 Campbell married Margaret, the eldest daughter of George Campbell, master of Loudoun. Upon the death of her grandfather, Hugh Campbell, 1st Baron Loudoun, in December 1622, she became baroness Loudoun, and her husband took his seat in the Parliament of Scotland in her right. He was created Earl of Loudoun, lord Farrinyeane and Mauchline by patent dated at Theobalds on 12 May 1633, but in consequence of his joining with the George Leslie, Earl of Rothes and others in parliament in their opposition to the court with regard to the act for empowering King Charles I to prescribe the apparel of churchmen, the patent was by a special order stopped at the chancery, and the title superseded. Soon after the passing of this act, the Scottish bishops resumed their episcopal costume, and in 1636 the Book of Canons Ecclesiastical and the order for using the new service-book were issued upon the sole authority of the King without consulting the general assembly. By his opposition to the policy of the court, Loudoun became a favourite of the adherents of the popular cause; and on 21 December 1637, at the meeting of the Privy Council at Dalkeith, in an eloquent speech, he detailed the grievances of the "Supplicants", and presented a petition on their behalf.

In 1638 the "tables" were formed and the covenant renewed. In these proceedings Loudoun took a very prominent part, and being elected elder for the Burgh of Irvine in the general assembly, which met at Glasgow in November 1638, he was appointed one of the assessors to the Moderator. In the following year, with the assistance of his friends, he seized the castles of Strathaven, Douglas, and Tantallon, and garrisoned them for the popular party. He marched with the Scottish army, under General Leslie, to the border, and acted as one of the Scottish commissioners at the short-lived Pacification of Berwick, which was concluded on 18 June 1639.

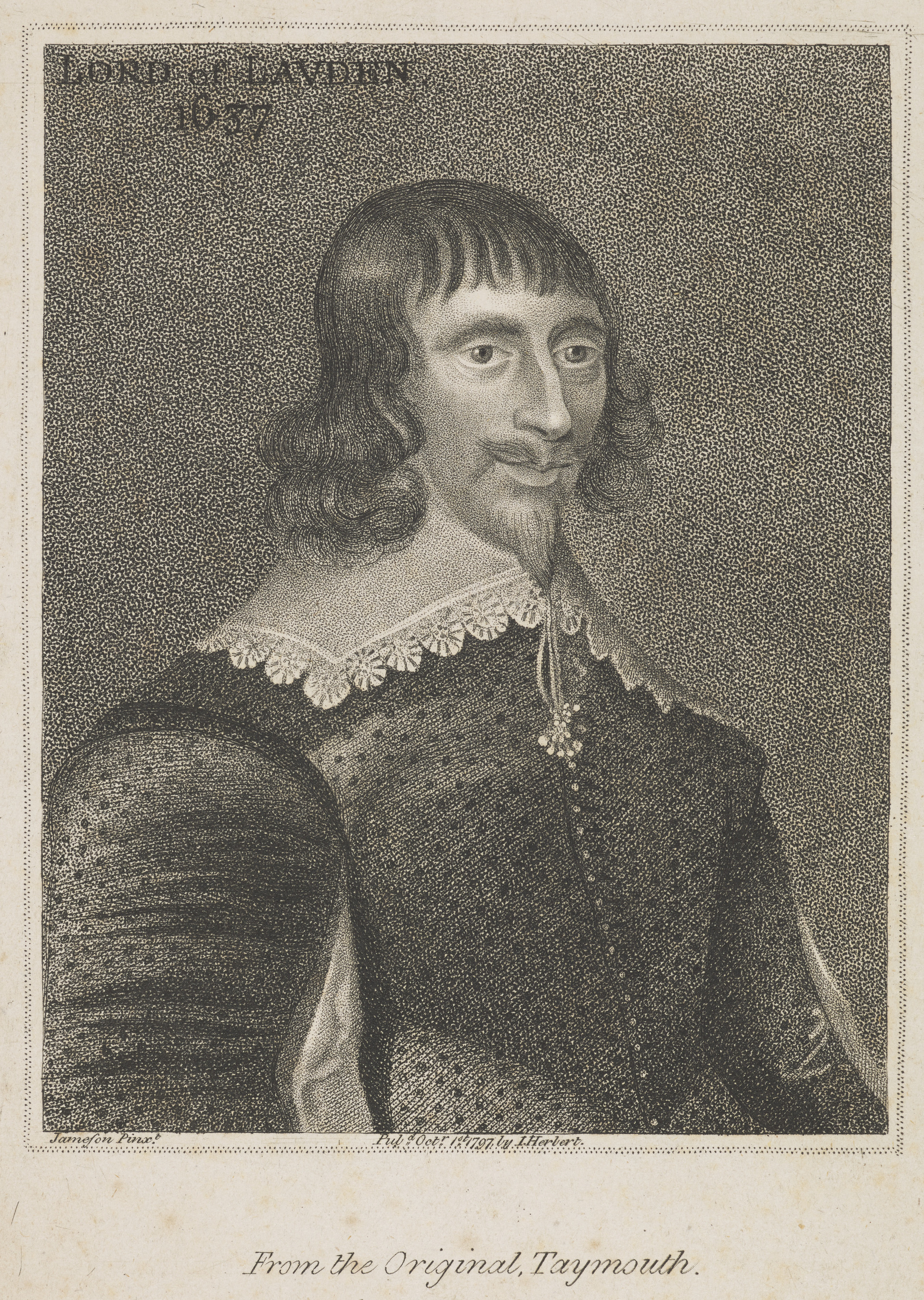
John Campbell

On 3 March 1640 Loudoun and the Charles Seton, Earl of Dunfermline, as commissioners from the estates, had an interview with Charles I at Whitehall, and remonstrated against the prorogation of the Parliament of Scotland by the king's commissioner (John, Earl of Traquair) before the business which had been brought before them had been disposed of. No answer was given to the remonstrance, but a few days after Loudoun was committed to the Tower of London upon acknowledging that a letter produced by the Earl of Traquair was in his own handwriting. This letter was addressed "Au Roy", and requested assistance from the French king. It was signed by the Earls of Montrose, Rothes, and Mar, Lords Loudoun, Montgomery, and Forester, and General Leslie, but was not dated. Loudoun protested without avail that it had been written before the pacification of Berwick, that it had never been sent, and that if he had committed any offence, he ought to be questioned for it in Scotland and not in England. According to Dr. Birch, a warrant was made out for Loudoun's execution without trial, but this has not been sufficiently corroborated, and after some months' confinement in the Tower he was liberated upon the intercession of James, Marquis of Hamilton, and returned to Scotland.

On 21 August in the same year the Scottish army entered England, and Loudoun with it. He took part in the Battle of Newburn on 28 August, and was one of the Scottish commissioners at Ripon in the following October. Having come to an agreement for the cessation of hostilities on the 25th of the same month, the further discussion of the treaty was adjourned to London, where the Scottish commissioners "were highly caressed by the parliament".

In August 1641 the King opened the Parliament of Scotland in person, the treaty with England was ratified, and offices and titles of honour were conferred on the "prime covenanters who were thought most capable to do him service". Accordingly, "the principal manager of the rebellion", as Clarendon calls him, was appointed Lord Chancellor of Scotland on 30 September 1641, and on 2 October took the oath of office, and received from the King the Great Seal, which, since the resignation of John Spottiswoode, the Archbishop of St. Andrews, had been kept by the Marquis of Hamilton. A pension of £1,000 a year was also granted him, and his title of Earl of Loudoun was allowed him, with precedency from the date of the original grant. When the king found that the estates would not give their consent to the nomination either of the Earl of Morton or of Lord Almond, as lord high treasurer, the treasury was put into commission, and Loudoun appointed the first commissioner.

In 1642 Loudoun was sent by the conservators of the peace to offer mediation between the king and the English parliament. He had several conferences with Charles at York, but, failing in the object of his mission, returned to Scotland. After the outbreak of the Civil War, Loudoun was sent to Oxford as one of the commission to mediate for peace. Charles, however, would not admit that the act of pacification gave the Scottish council any authority to mediate, and refused to allow the commissioners to proceed to London for that purpose. In 1643 Loudoun was again chosen elder for the burgh of Irvine to the general assembly, but this time declined the nomination. In the same year he was with the other Scottish commissioners invited to attend the discussions of the assembly of divines at Westminster. In 1645 he was appointed one of the Scottish commissioners to the treaty of Uxbridge, and though he did his best to convince Charles I of the impolicy of holding out any further against the parliamentary demands, his efforts were unavailing. At Newcastle he again unsuccessfully attempted to persuade Charles, then virtually a prisoner of the Scottish army. In 1647 Loudoun, with the Earls of Lauderdale and Lanark, was sent to treat with Charles at Carisbrooke Castle where they entered into the "Engagement" with Charles. On his return from England he was chosen president of the parliament which met on 2 March 1648. Persuaded by the more violent party of the Covenanters, who denounced the "Engagement" as "an unlawful confederacy with the enemies of God", he changed sides and opposed the measure. He was, however, obliged to do public penance in the High Church of Edinburgh for the part which he had originally taken. When Montrose was brought to the bar to receive sentence, Loudoun commented with severity upon his conduct. As Lord Chancellor he assisted at the coronation of Charles II at Scone on 1 January 1650, and was present at the Battle of Dunbar, where some of his letters to Charles II fell into Cromwell's hands. These letters were afterwards published by the order of the English Parliament.

After the Battle of Worcester (September 1651) Loudoun retired into the highlands, and in 1653 joined William, Earl of Glencairn and other Cavaliers who had risen in the King's favour. Divisions arising among the leaders, Loudoun left them and retired further north. He at length surrendered to General George Monck, whose brilliant success had demonstrated the uselessness of further resistance on the part of the Royalists. Loudoun and his eldest son, Lord Mauchline, were both excepted out of Cromwell's act of indemnity, by which £400 was settled on the Countess Loudoun and her heirs out of her husband's estates. Upon the Restoration, notwithstanding all that Loudoun had suffered for the royal cause, he was deprived of the chancellorship, which had been granted to him "ad vitam aut culpam"; his pension, however, was still continued to him.

In the first session of parliament in 1661 he spoke strongly in defence of his friend, the Archibald Campbell, Marquess of Argyll, who was then under an impeachment for high treason. Argyll was executed, and Loudoun became apprehensive lest he too might share the same fate. In the following year, by an act "containing some exceptions from the Act of Indemnite", he was fined £12,000 (Scottish pounds). He died at Edinburgh on 15 March 1663, and was buried in the Loudoun Kirk, in what is now East Ayrshire.

Several of his speeches were printed in the form of pamphlets, and will be found among the political tracts in the British Museum.

== Family ==
With his wife, Margaret, who survived him, Loudoun had two sons and two daughters. His eldest son, James, succeeded to the title, and died at Leyden. On the death of James, the fifth earl (a grandson of the second earl), the title descended to his only daughter, Flora, who married Francis, 2nd Earl of Moira, afterwards 1st Marquis of Hastings. Upon the death of Henry, 4th Marquis of Hastings, in 1868, his eldest sister Edith became the Countess of Loudoun, and the title passed to her son Charles, 11th Earl of Loudoun.

== Coat of arms ==
Coat of arms of John Campbell, 1st Earl of Loudoun
Coronet A coronet of an Earl Crest An eagle with two necks displayed gules in a flame of fire proper. Escutcheon Gyronny of eight ermine and gules. Supporters Dexter: an armed man bearing a pick on his shoulder proper; Sinister: a lady richly attired with a signet letter in her sinister hand proper. Motto l byde my tyme

Academic offices
Preceded by John Spottiswoode; Archbishop of St Andrews	Chancellor of the University of St Andrews; 1643–1661	Succeeded by James Sharp; Archbishop of St Andrews
Political offices
Preceded by Duke of Hamilton	Lord Chancellor of Scotland; 1641–1652/1660	Succeeded by Alexander Jaffray
Peerage of Scotland
New creation	Earl of Loudoun; 1633–1662	Succeeded by James Campbell
Preceded by Hugh Campbell	Lord Campbell of Loudoun; 1619–1661	Succeeded by James Campbell
