= John Butler-Bowdon, 25th Baron Grey de Ruthyn =

British peer

The Right Honourable The Lord Grey de Ruthyn JP

Personal details
- Born: John Lancelot Wykeham Butler-Bowden; 25 October 1883 Sheffield
- Died: 25 October 1963 (aged 80) Barlborough, Derbyshire
- Relations: Bertha Clifton, 22nd Baroness Grey de Ruthyn (grandmother)
- Parent(s): Lancelot Butler-Bowden; Hon. Ella Clifton
- Education: Mount St Mary's College

John Lancelot Wykeham Butler-Bowden, 25th Baron Grey de Ruthyn JP (25 October 1883 – 25 October 1963) was a British peer. He was an advocate of animal welfare and an opponent of hunting.

== Early life ==
Butler-Bowden was born near Sheffield on 25 October 1883. He was the only child of Lancelot George Butler-Bowden (1851–1909) and Hon. Ella Cicely Mary Clifton (1856–1912), who married in 1879.

His paternal grandparents were John Butler-Bowdon of Pleasington Hall and Amelia (née Whitgreave) Butler-Bowdon. His maternal grandparents were Augustus Wykeham Clifton (brother of John Talbot Clifton of Lytham Hall, MP for North Lancashire) and Bertha Clifton, suo jure 22nd Baroness Grey de Ruthyn (née Rawdon-Hastings).

He was educated at rural Mount St Mary's College. The Jesuit order had been operating in the Sheffield area since 1620 and, after the Catholic Emancipation of 1829, they were allowed to educate the local youth openly. This led to the founding of "The Mount," as it is familiarly known, in 1842.

== Career ==
After graduating, Butler-Bowden took up residence at the village of Barlborough, Derbyshire, and served on the bench of magistrates, including as Justice of the Peace for Derbyshire.

Lord Grey de Ruthyn was President of the League Against Cruel Sports in the 1950s until his death in 1963. In 1958, he announced his intention of speaking in the House of Lords to further the League's campaign against hunting. Following the 108th Grand National Steeplechase, that took place at Aintree Racecourse, where four horses died or where destroyed after injuries on the thirty jumps of the course, Lord Grey called the race "scandalous" saying "It is a great blot on civilization. I wonder if this is a much better society than it was two or three hundred years ago. Instead of cock fighting and bear baiting, we have these races."

Lord Grey de Ruthyn was elected president of the National Canine Defence League in 1957. He was honorary treasurer of the Anti-Vivisection Society.

=== Peerage ===
His title, which dated back to 1324, descended through his maternal grandmother, Bertha, Baroness Grey de Ruthyn (who claimed the barony following the death of her younger brother, Henry Rawdon-Hastings, 4th Marquess of Hastings, in 1885). His uncles, the 23rd and 24th Barons, both died without issue. In 1934, the title fell into abeyance following the death of his uncle, the 24th Baron, as Butler-Bowdon and his aunt, Lady Bellingham (née Lelgarde Harry Florence Clifton, wife of Sir Henry Bellingham, 4th Baronet) as neither could assume the title while the other was living since the title could descend in the female line. Following the death of Lady Bellingham in 1939, the Barony was called out of abeyance in his favour in 1940.

In 1953, Lord Grey de Ruthyn, who described himself as "Britain's poorest peer", did not attend Queen Elizabeth II's coronation "because he said he could not afford it" and "declined his hereditary right to carry the golden spurs at the Queen's coronation because, he said, the cost of the robes and coronet–$1,400–was prohibitive."

== Personal life ==
Lord Grey de Ruthyn had a heart attack at age 77. He died, unmarried and without issue, at his home, Barlborough House, on his eightieth birthday, 25 October 1963. On his death, the barony fell into abeyance between the sisters of the 22nd Baroness.

== In popular culture ==
Hints of Baron Grey's life and character were recorded by his neighbor and fellow nobleman Osbert Sitwell in the book Queen Mary and Others.

Peerage of England
| Preceded by Cecil Talbot Clifton, 24th Baron | Baron Grey de Ruthyn; 1940–1963 | Succeeded by Abeyant |
