= George Rawdon-Hastings, 2nd Marquess of Hastings =

British peer and courtier

The Most Honourable The Marquess of Hastings
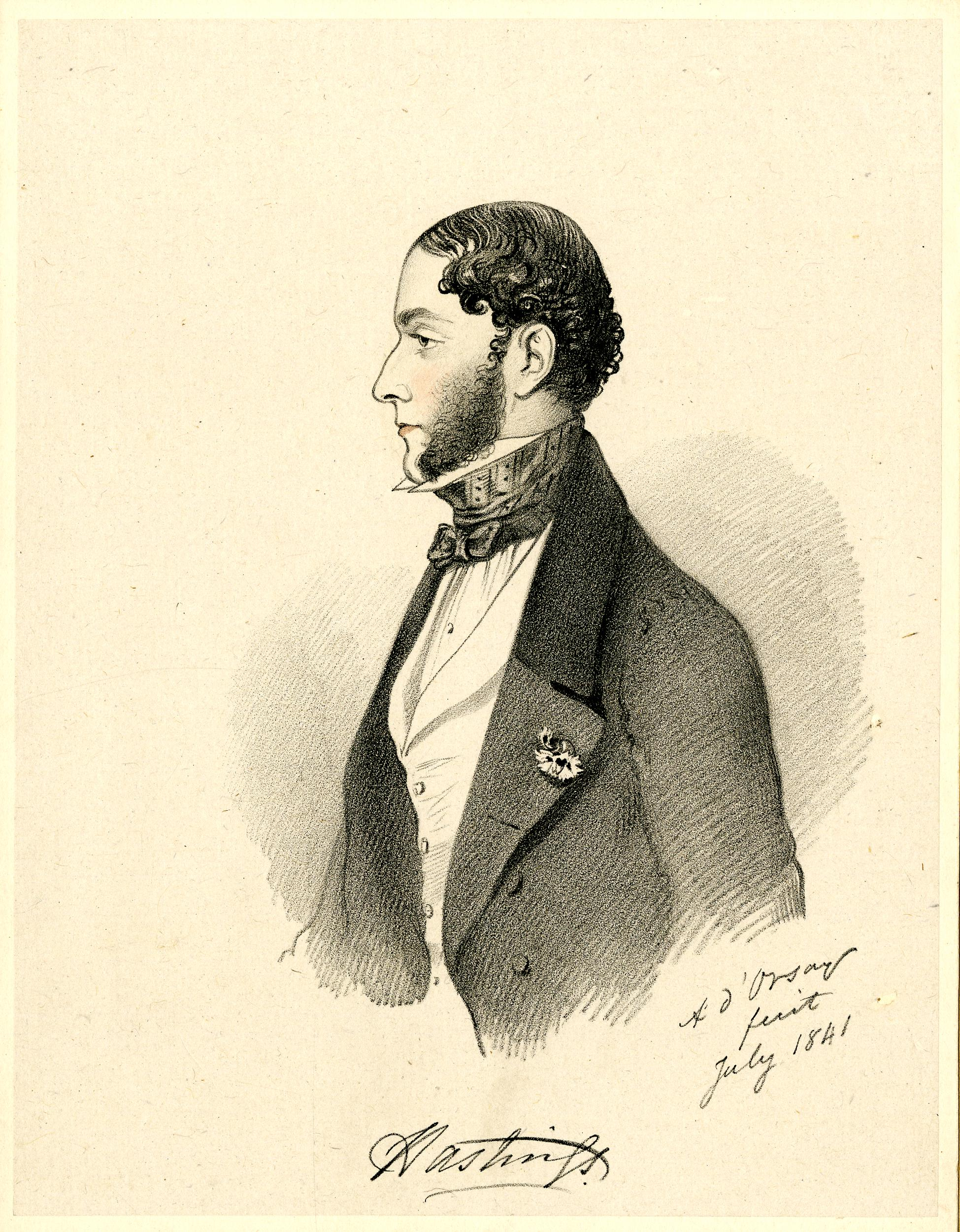
- Portrait by Alfred d'Orsay, 1841

Lord of the Bedchamber
- In office 1830–1831
- Preceded by: New monarch
- Succeeded by: The Marquess of Queensberry

Personal details
- Born: George Augustus Francis Rawdon-Hastings; 4 February 1808
- Died: 13 January 1844 (aged 35)
- Spouse: Barbara Yelverton, 20th Baroness Grey de Ruthyn (m. 1831)
- Children: Paulyn Rawdon-Hastings, 3rd Marquess of Hastings; Edith Rawdon-Hastings, 10th Countess of Loudoun; Bertha Clifton, 22nd Baroness Grey de Ruthyn; Lady Victoria Rawdon-Hastings; Henry Rawdon-Hastings, 4th Marquess of Hastings; Frances Marsham, Countess of Romney
- Parent(s): Francis Rawdon-Hastings, 2nd Earl of Moira; Flora Mure-Campbell, Countess of Loudoun

George Augustus Francis Rawdon-Hastings, 2nd Marquess of Hastings (4 February 1808 – 13 January 1844), styled Lord Rawdon from birth until 1817 and Earl of Rawdon from 1817 to 1826, was a British peer and courtier.

== Early life ==
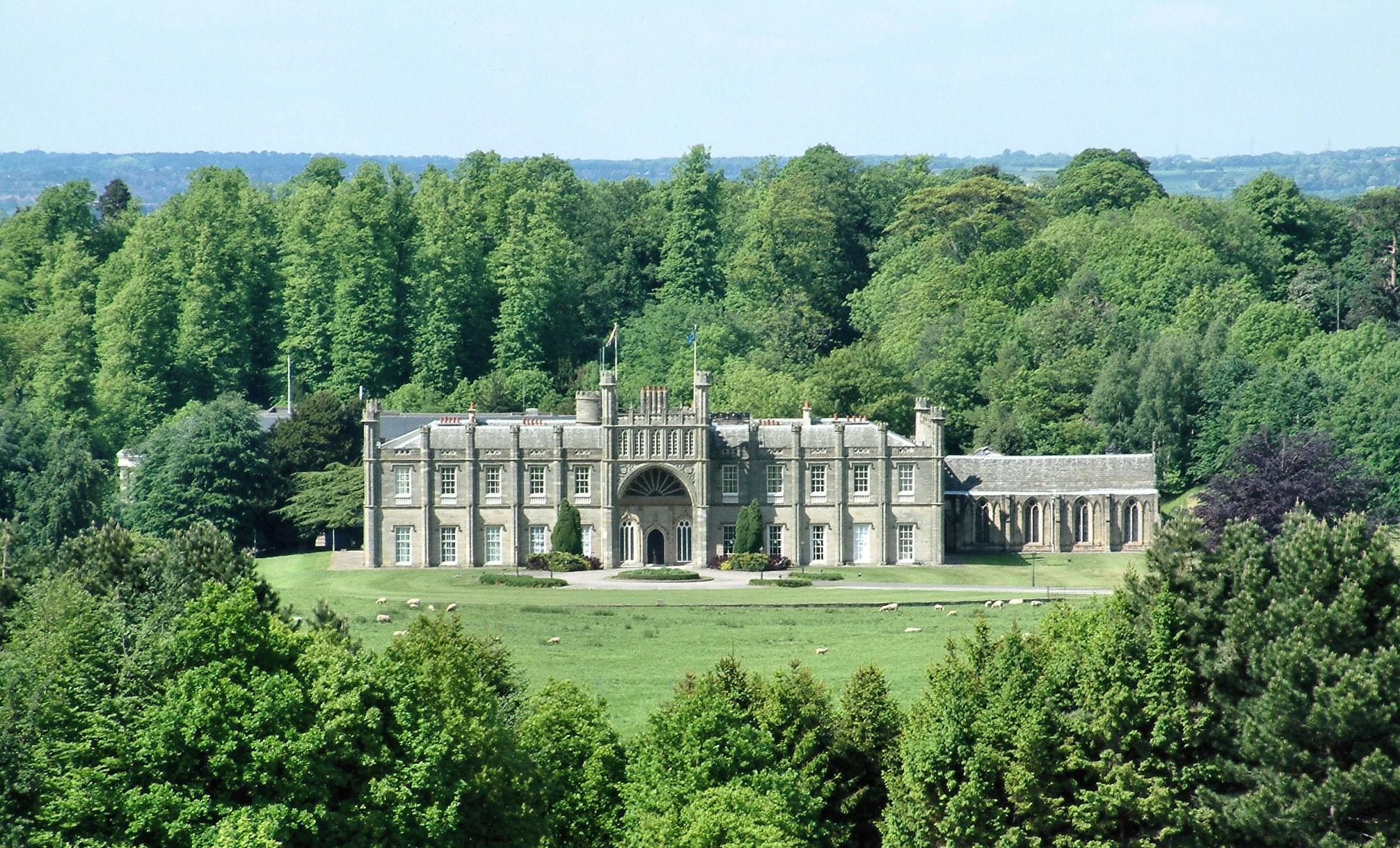
Donington Hall

Rawdon was born in 1808, the eldest son of Francis Rawdon-Hastings, 2nd Earl of Moira (later 1st Marquess of Hastings) and his wife, Flora Mure-Campbell, 6th Countess of Loudoun.

== Career ==
Inheriting his father's titles in 1826 (and later, his mother's in 1840), Lord Hastings was a Gentleman of the Bedchamber to King William IV from 1830 to 1831.

On his father's death, he inherited a heavily mortgaged Donington Hall in Leicestershire. His chief passion was foxhunting and he kept his own pack of hounds at the hall in purpose-built kennels.

== Personal life ==
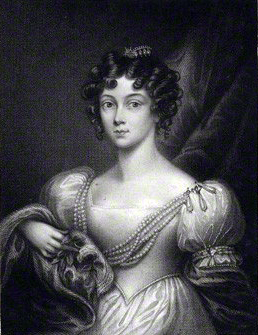
Lord Hastings' wife, Barbara Yelverton, Marchioness of Hastings (portrait published in 1828).

On 1 August 1831, Lord Hastings was married to Barbara Yelverton, 20th Baroness Grey de Ruthyn. She was the only daughter and heiress of Henry Yelverton, 19th Baron Grey de Ruthyn and his wife, the former Anna Maria Kelham (daughter of William Kelham). Her father, who died seven months after her birth, was a tenant and sometime friend of Lord Byron. Together, Barbara and George were the parents of six children:

- Paulyn Reginald Serlo Rawdon-Hastings, 3rd Marquess of Hastings (1832–1851), who died unmarried.
- Lady Edith Maud Rawdon-Hastings, later 10th Countess of Loudoun (1833–1874), who married Charles Frederick Abney-Hastings, 1st Baron Donington.
- Lady Bertha Lelgarde Rawdon-Hastings, later 22nd Baroness Grey de Ruthyn (1835–1887), who married Augustus Wykeham Clifton.
- Lady Victoria Maria Louisa Rawdon-Hastings (1837–1888)
- Henry Weysford Charles Plantagenet Rawdon-Hastings, 4th Marquess of Hastings (1842–1868), who married Lady Florence Paget, only daughter of Henry Paget, 2nd Marquess of Anglesey.
- Lady Frances Augusta Constance Muir Rawdon-Hastings (1844–1910), who married Charles Marsham, 4th Earl of Romney.

He died an early death on 13 January 1844, at the age of 35. He was succeeded by his 12-year-old eldest son, Paulyn, who himself died in Ireland six years later. Paulyn was succeeded in turn by his younger brother Lord Henry Weysford Charles Plantagenet Rawdon-Hastings, later 4th Marquess of Hastings and 9th Earl of Loudoun.

On 9 April 1845, fifteen months after her first husband's death, Barbara married Captain Hastings Reginald Henry (1808–1878), who in 1849 took the name of Yelverton by royal licence. They settled at Efford House near Lymington and had one daughter, Barbara Yelverton (12 January 1849 – 1 October 1924), who married John Yarde-Buller, 2nd Baron Churston.

Court offices
Preceded by New monarch	Lord of the Bedchamber; 1830–1831	Succeeded by The Marquess of Queensberry
Peerage of the United Kingdom
Preceded by Francis Rawdon-Hastings	Marquess of Hastings; 1826–1844	Succeeded by Paulyn Rawdon-Hastings
Peerage of Scotland
Preceded by Flora Mure-Campbell	Earl of Loudoun; 1840–1844	Succeeded by Paulyn Rawdon-Hastings
