= Donington Hall =

19th century country house in Leicestershire

Coordinates: 52.8376°N 1.3771°W

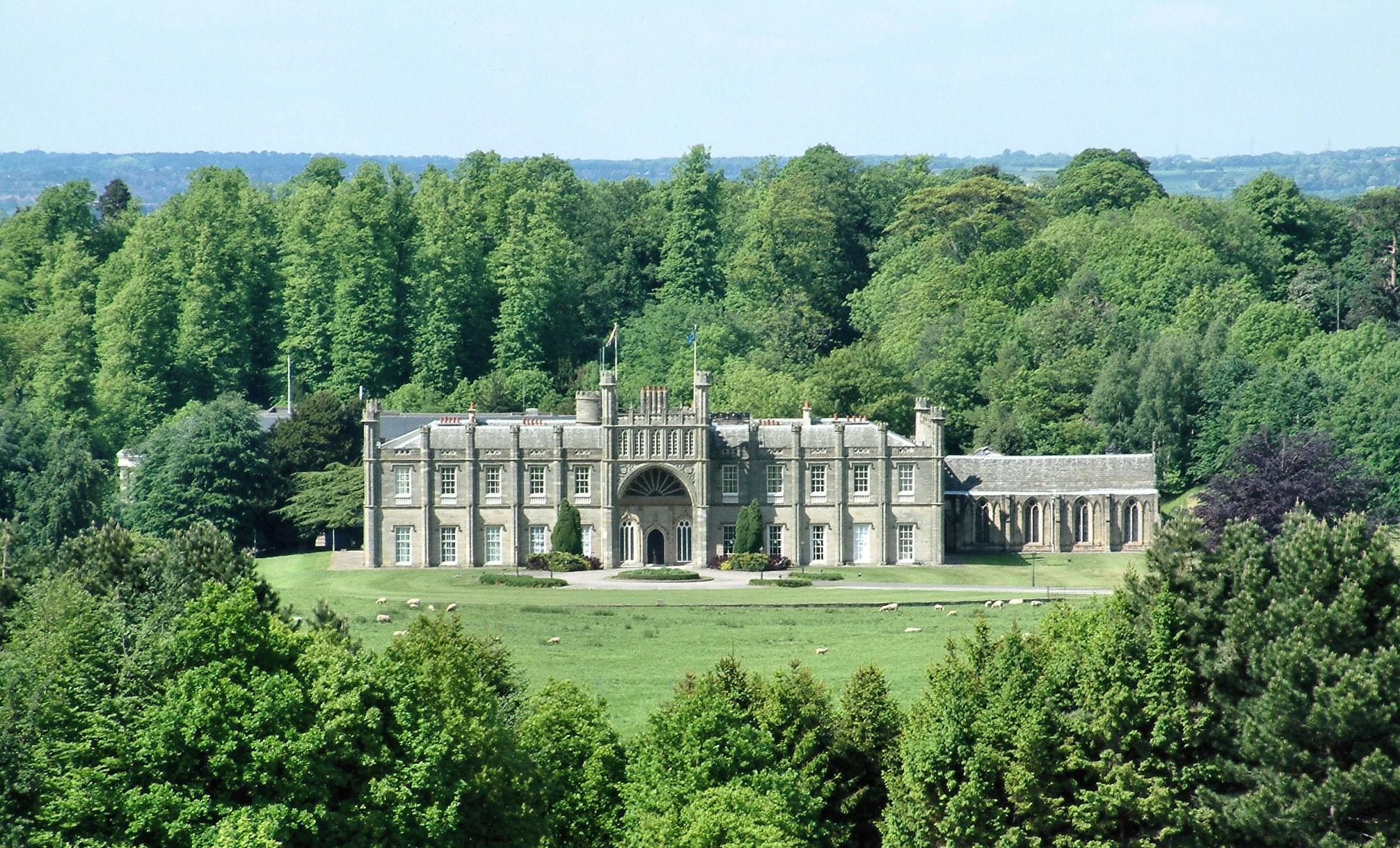
- Donington Hall

- Location within Leicestershire

General information
- Status: headquarters
- Type: headquarters mansion house
- Location: Castle Donington, Leicestershire
- Current tenants: MotorSport Vision Ltd
- Construction started: c 1790
- Completed: 1826
- Opened: 1826
- Renovated: 1976; headquarters
- Owner: MotorSport Vision (since 2021)

Other information
- Parking: Yes

Website
- MSV.com

References
- Hall announcement, MSV

Donington Hall is a country house set in parkland near Castle Donington village, North West Leicestershire. The Hall and Estate was purchased in April 2021 by MotorSport Vision, which also operates the neighbouring Donington Park racing circuit.

The Hall had previously served as the headquarters for British Midland International until it was merged into British Airways in 2012, then was owned until 2020 by Stuart Garner, the former owner and CEO of the Norton Motorcycle Company as the company's headquarters. Norton went into administration with rights to the name being sold in April 2020.

== History ==
The house was built, on the site of an earlier house which had been demolished and rebuilt soon after 1600, from c. 1790, for Francis Rawdon-Hastings, 2nd Earl of Moira (created Marquess of Hastings in 1816), in a Gothic form by William Wilkins. Rawdon Hastings served as the Governor-General of the Presidency of Fort William from 1813 until 1823, during which time he led the British in the Third Anglo-Maratha War, or the ‘Pindari War’ from 1817 to 1819.

It passed in 1826 to the young George, a foxhunting enthusiast who kept his own pack of hounds at the hall in purpose-built kennels. George died an early death in 1844 at the age of 35 and was succeeded by his eldest son, 12-year-old Paulyn, who himself died in Ireland only six years later. Paulyn was succeeded in turn by his younger brother Lord Henry Weysford Charles Plantagenet Rawdon-Hastings, later 4th Marquess of Hastings and 9th Earl of Loudon.

Harry was a profligate gambler and spent the family's fortune. On his own early death in 1868, he left the hall in the failing care of his sister Edith Maud and her husband Charles Clifton, later Baron Donington and afterwards his two sons, the 2nd and 3rd Barons. In 1901 it was sold to Frederick Gratton, son of Lord Gratton of Stapleford Park.

=== The Shields family ===
From 1902, Donington was the property of the Gillies Shields family. The hall was requisitioned at the start of World War I by the British government and turned into a prisoner of war camp. While interned at Donington Hall in 1915, the German naval pilot Gunther Plüschow made the only successful escape from Britain in either World War.

In 1931, the then owner of the estate, Alderman John Gillies Shields J.P. agreed to allow Fred Craner use of the extensive roads on the land for motor racing, thus creating the Donington Park circuit. The circuit at Donington Park was closed in 1939 due to World War II, when it was requisitioned by the Ministry of Defence and was converted into a military vehicle depot and storage area.

With the whole estate needing extensive renovations after the war, the family rented the estate out as farm land. They retained the Hall, which after the Soviet Army ensured a Communist regime in Hungary, became a refugee camp for those who came to the East Midlands. A letter to The Daily Telegraph from the Gillies Shields and Joyce Pearce thanked all those who were providing clothing, books and toys for the children, promising that once the immediate crisis was over, it was their intention to turn Donington Hall into "a home and school for children of all nationalities who now live without hope in the displaced persons camps in Germany; their parents were our allies, their sufferings caused through loyalty to our cause."

In 1971, Tom Wheatcroft bought part of the estate, including the famous prewar racing circuit, from the Shields family for £100,000.

=== Corporate ownership ===
In 1976, British Midland Airways purchased the hall from the Shields family to renovate and convert into their headquarters. British Midland Airways moved to Donington Hall in 1982. The airline was subsequently rebranded as British Midland International, employing 800 workers at Donington Hall in 2007. In 2012, International Airlines Group announced it may lay off up to 1,200 BMI employees, with proposed layoffs mainly from the BMI head office at Donington Hall.

In March 2013 the Norton Motorcycle Company bought Donington Hall from International Airlines Group. Norton produced hand-built bikes from a nearby building called Hastings House, previously BMI's call centre, while Donington Hall was an events venue. In 2016 Norton's chief executive Stuart Garner bought the neighbouring property to Donington Hall, the Priest House Hotel, which expanded his hospitality business. The combined properties are set in 80 acres (32 ha) of grounds, which are bordered by an ancient deer park and the River Trent.

As of 2020, the hall was being marketed for sale as part of a wider package on behalf of the administrator of the failed Norton business.

=== Acquisition by MotorSport Vision ===
In April 2021, it was announced that MotorSport Vision had purchased the freehold of the Donington Hall Estate comprising Donington Hall itself, former office building Hastings House, the Lansdowne workshops building and 28 acres (11 ha) of grounds adjacent to the Donington Park race circuit. The chief executive of MotorSport Vision is the former racing driver, Jonathan Palmer. It was confirmed as part of the announcement that the Grade II* listed Hall would be transformed into a 49 bedroom hotel, reflecting the historic association with the motor racing circuit.

Hastings House, the former British Midland International office, will be converted into the Donington Hall Motorhouse, a new facility for housing supercars, classic road and racing cars and motorcycles. The Lansdowne workshops, totalling 18,000 square feet (1,700 m^{2}), will be available to let for high-end motor engineering businesses which support the preparation and maintenance of vehicles kept at the Donington Hall Motorhouse and used on the race circuit.

The upgraded facility will benefit from a private, 1-mile-long (1.6 km) landscaped drive from the original gatehouse by the circuit and include access directly to the circuit. Following completion of the works in early 2027, the hotel will accommodate 49 bedrooms. Nicholas Walley was appointed general manager of the hotel in November 2023.

== See also ==
- Donington Park
- MotorSport Vision
