= Baron Hungerford =

Title in the Peerage of England

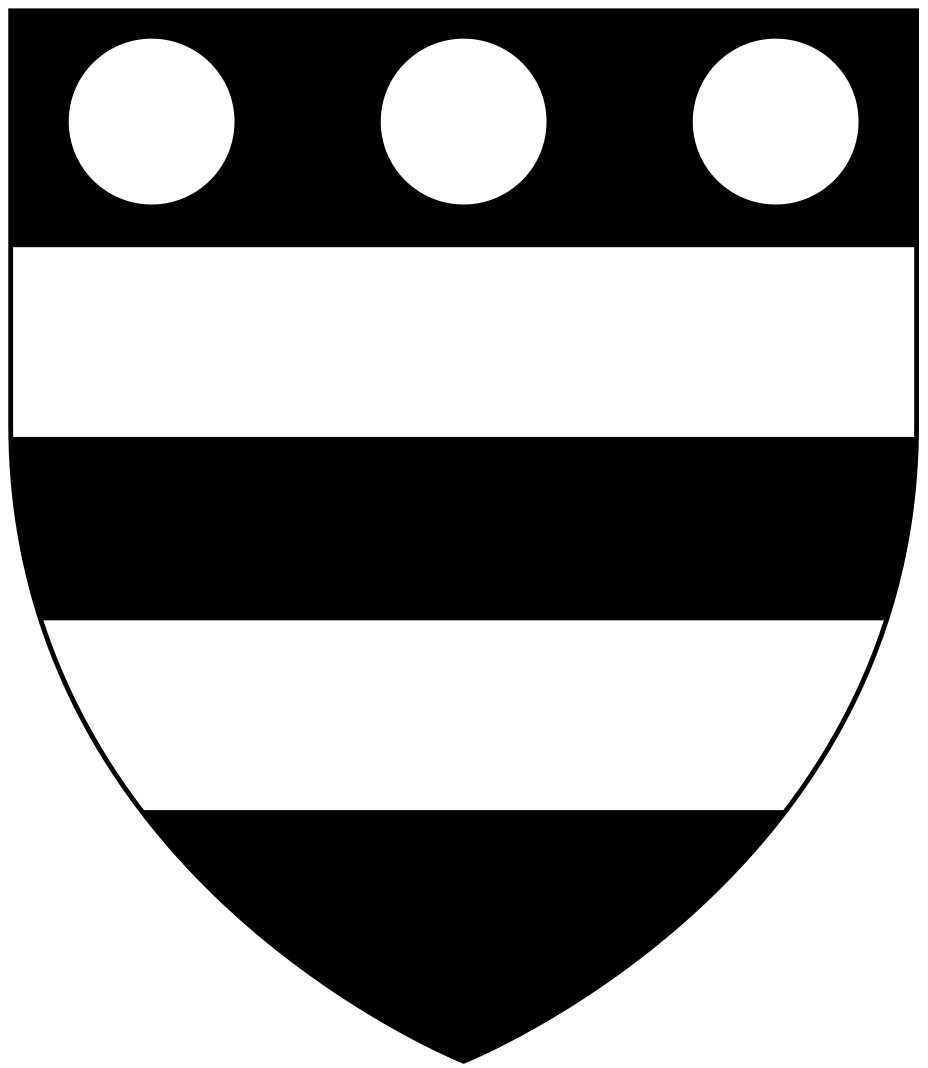
Arms of Hungerford: Sable, two bars argent in chief three plates

Baron Hungerford is a title in the Peerage of England. It was created on 7 January 1426 for Walter Hungerford, who was summoned to parliament, had been Member of Parliament, Speaker of the House and invested as Knight of the Order of the Garter before and was made Lord High Treasurer one year before he became a peer. The man who would later succeed as third baron was created Baron de Moleyns on 13 January 1445 by writ of summons; both titles merged when he succeeded as Baron Hungerford in 1459. The third baron was attainted and the peerage forfeit in 1461. This attainder was reversed in 1485 for the then 4th baroness of Hungerford, and so it came into the Hastings family of Earls of Huntingdon until 1789, when it came into the Rawdon(-Hastings) family of the Marquesses of Hastings until 1868 when it fell into abeyance. This abeyance was terminated three years later for a member of the Abney-Hastings family and an Earl of Loudoun. In 1920 it again fell into abeyance, which was terminated one year later for the Philipps family of the Viscounts of St Davids where it has remained since.

Another Barony of Hungerford with the distinction de Heytesbury was created in the Peerage of England on 8 June 1526 for another Walter Hungerford, who was summoned to parliament. He was attainted in 1540 and the peerage forfeited. This attainder has not been reversed since.

== Barons Hungerford (1426); Barons de Moleyns (1445) ==
- Walter Hungerford, 1st Baron Hungerford (1378–1449)
- Robert Hungerford, 2nd Baron Hungerford (c. 1400–1459)
- Robert Hungerford, 3rd Baron Hungerford, 1st Baron de Moleyns (c. 1420–1464), attainted and forfeit 1461
- Mary Hastings, 5th Baroness Botreaux, 4th Baroness Hungerford, 2nd Baroness de Moleyns née Hungerford (c. 1466–c. 1530) attainder reversed 1485
- George Hastings, 6th Baron Botreaux, 5th Baron Hungerford, 3rd Baron de Moleyns, 3rd Baron Hastings (1488–1545) (created Earl of Huntingdon in 1529)
- (The baronies of Botreaux, Hungerford, de Moleyns and Hastings then descended together until the death of Charles Rawdon-Hastings, 11th Earl of Loudoun in 1920)
- Francis Hastings, 2nd Earl of Huntingdon, 6th Baron Hungerford (1514–1560)
- Henry Hastings, 3rd Earl of Huntingdon, 7th Baron Hungerford (1536–1595)
- George Hastings, 4th Earl of Huntingdon, 8th Baron Hungerford (1540–1604)
- Henry Hastings, 5th Earl of Huntingdon, 9th Baron Hungerford (1586–1643)
- Ferdinando Hastings, 6th Earl of Huntingdon, 10th Baron Hungerford (1609–1656)
- Theophilus Hastings, 7th Earl of Huntingdon, 11th Baron Hungerford (1650–1701)
- George Hastings, 8th Earl of Huntingdon, 12th Baron Hungerford (1677–1705)
- Theophilus Hastings, 9th Earl of Huntingdon, 13th Baron Hungerford (1696–1746)
- Francis Hastings, 10th Earl of Huntingdon, 14th Baron Hungerford (1729–1789)
- Elizabeth Rawdon, 16th Baroness Botreaux, 15th Baroness Hungerford (1731–1808)
- Francis Edward Rawdon-Hastings, 2nd Earl of Moira, 16th Baron Hungerford (1754–1826) (created Marquess of Hastings in 1816)
- George Augustus Francis Rawdon-Hastings, 2nd Marquess of Hastings, 17th Baron Hungerford (1808–1844)
- Paulyn Reginald Serlo Rawdon-Hastings, 3rd Marquess of Hastings, 18th Baron Hungerford (1832–1851)
- Henry Weysford Charles Plantagenet Rawdon-Hastings, 4th Marquess of Hastings, 19th Baron Hungerford (1842–1868) (abeyant 1868)
- Edith Maud Abney-Hastings, 10th Countess of Loudoun, 20th Baroness Hungerford (1833–1874) (abeyance terminated 1871)
- Charles Edward Rawdon-Hastings, 11th Earl of Loudoun, 22nd Baron Botreaux, 21st Baron Hungerford, 19th Baron de Moleyns, 19th Baron Hastings (1855–1920) (abeyant 1920)
- Elizabeth Frances Philipps, Viscountess St Davids, 22nd Baroness Hungerford, 20th Baroness de Moleyns, 14th Baroness Strange née Abney-Hastings (1884–1974) (abeyance terminated 1921)
- See Viscount St Davids for further Barons Hungerford.

== Barons Hungerford de Heytesbury (1526) ==
- Walter Hungerford, 1st Baron Hungerford de Heytesbury (c. 1502–1540) attainted and forfeit 1540

== Sources ==
- Leigh Rayment's Peerage Pages
- Leigh Rayment's Historical List of MPs
