= Marquess of Hastings =

Marquessate in the Peerage of the United Kingdom

Marquessate of Hastings
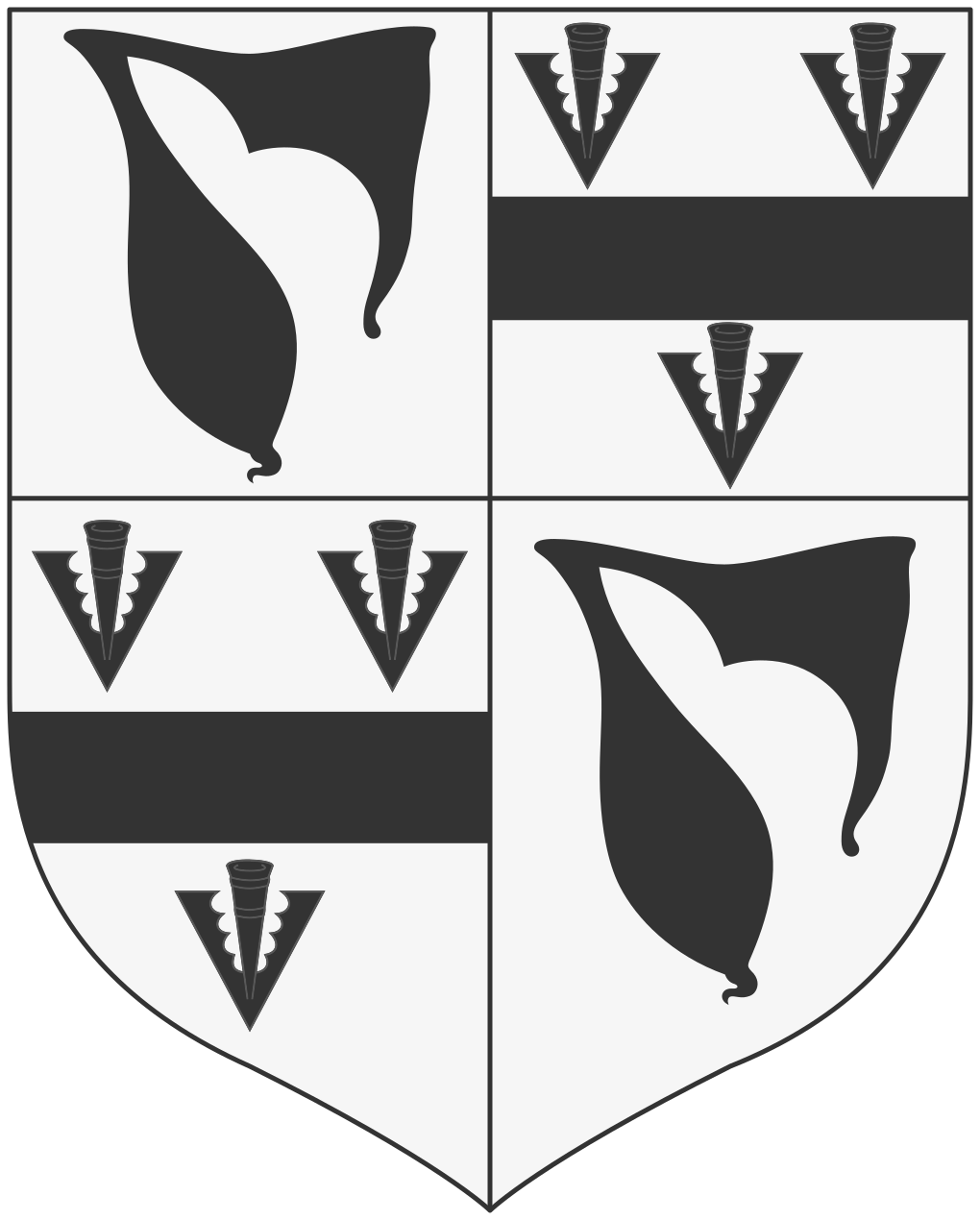
- Quarterly, 1st & 4th: arg., a maunch sa.; 2nd & 3rd: arg. a fess betw. three pheons sa.
- Creation date: 6 December 1816
- Created by: George III
- Peerage: Peerage of the United Kingdom
- First holder: Francis Rawdon-Hastings, 1st Marquess of Hastings, 2nd Earl of Moira, 2nd Baron Rawdon, 5th Baronet (1754–1826)
- Last holder: Henry Weysford Charles Plantagenet Rawdon-Hastings, 4th Marquess of Hastings, 9th Earl of Loudoun, 5th Earl of Moira, 5th Baron Rawdon, 8th Baronet (1842–1868)
- Remainder to: the 1st Marquess's heirs male of the body lawfully begotten.
- Subsidiary titles: Earl of Moira; Baron of Rawdon Baronet Rawdon
- Status: Extinct
- Extinction date: 1868
- Seat: Donington Hall
- Motto: Et nos quoque tela sparsimus

Marquess of Hastings was a title in the Peerage of the United Kingdom. It was created on 6 December 1816 for Francis Rawdon-Hastings, 2nd Earl of Moira.

== History ==
The Rawdon family descended from Francis Rawdon (d. 1668), of Rawdon, Yorkshire. His son Sir George Rawdon, 1st Baronet settled in the village of Moira, County Down. His son, the second Baronet, and grandson, the third Baronet, both represented County Down in the Irish House of Commons. The latter was succeeded by his son, Sir John Rawdon, 4th Baronet. He was created Baron Rawdon, of Moira in the County of Down, in 1750, and Earl of Moira in 1762. Both titles were in the Peerage of Ireland. Lord Moira married as his third wife Elizabeth Hastings, 12th Baroness Hastings, 16th Baroness Botreaux, 11th Baroness Hungerford and 10th Baroness de Moleyns, daughter of Theophilus Hastings, 9th Earl of Huntingdon. Their son Francis Rawdon was a prominent soldier and colonial administrator. He was created Baron Rawdon, of Rawdon, in the County of York, in his own right in the Peerage of Great Britain in 1783, ten years before inheriting the earldom from his father. He assumed the additional surname of Hastings in 1789 in accordance with the will of his uncle Francis Hastings, 10th Earl of Huntingdon. In 1808 he succeeded his mother in the baronies of Hastings, Botreaux, Hungerford and de Moleyns. In 1816 he was created Viscount Loudoun, Earl of Rawdon and Marquess of Hastings in the Peerage of the United Kingdom. Lord Hastings married Flora Mure-Campbell, 6th Countess of Loudoun.

He was succeeded by his eldest son, the second Marquess. In 1840 he also succeeded his mother in the earldom of Loudoun. Lord Hastings married Barbara Yelverton, 20th Baroness Grey de Ruthyn. He was succeeded by his eldest son, the third Marquess. He died aged only seventeen and was succeeded by his younger brother, the fourth Marquess. In 1858 he also succeeded his mother as 21st Baron Grey de Ruthyn. Lord Hastings died childless in 1868. On his death the baronetcy of Moira, baronies of Rawdon, viscountcy of Loudoun, earldoms of Moira and Rawdon and marquessate of Hastings became extinct. The Scottish earldom of Loudoun was passed on to his eldest sister Edith Rawdon-Hastings, 10th Countess of Loudoun (see Earl of Loudoun for further history of this title). The baronies of Botreaux, Hungerford, de Moleyns, Hastings and Grey de Ruthyn fell into abeyance between his sisters. The baronies of Botreaux, Hastings of Hungerford, de Moleyns, Hastings were called out of abeyance in 1871 in favour of Lord Hastings's eldest sister, the aforementioned Edith Rawdon-Hastings, 10th Countess of Loudoun, while the barony of Grey de Ruthyn was called out of abeyance the same year in favour of his second sister Bertha, 22nd Baroness Grey de Ruthyn (see the Baron Grey de Ruthyn for further history of this title).

== Rawdon Baronets, of Moira (1665) ==
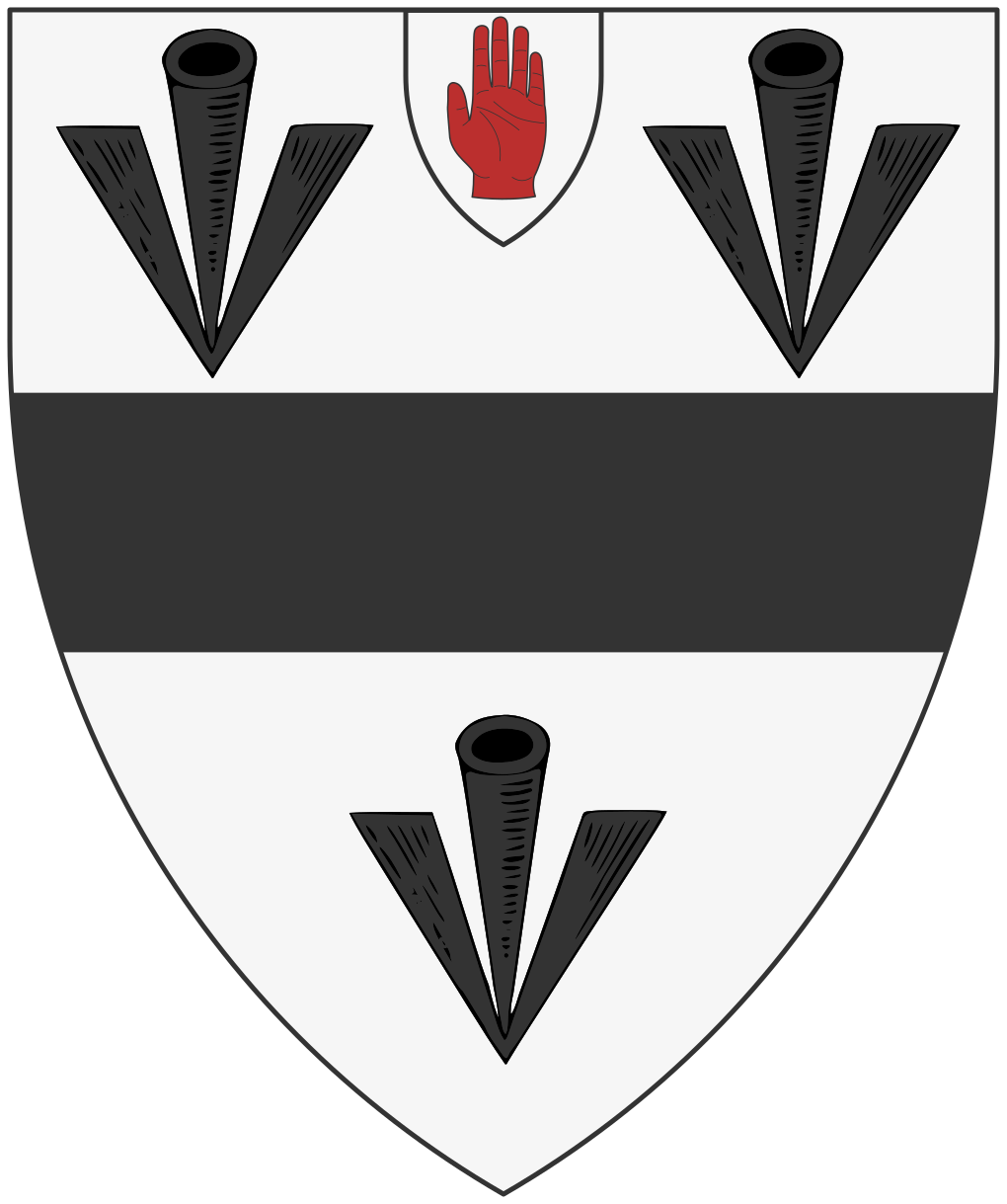
The coat of arms of the Rawdon baronets.

- Sir George Rawdon, 1st Baronet (1604–1684)
- Sir Arthur Rawdon, 2nd Baronet (1662–1695)
- Sir John Rawdon, 3rd Baronet (1690–1724)
- Sir John Rawdon, 4th Baronet (created Baron Rawdon in 1750 and Earl of Moira in 1762)

== Earls of Moira (1762) ==
- John Rawdon, 1st Earl of Moira, 1st Baron Rawdon, 4th Baronet (1720–1793)
- Francis Rawdon-Hastings, 2nd Earl of Moira, 2nd Baron Rawdon, 5th Baronet (created Marquess of Hastings in 1816)

== Marquesses of Hastings (1816) ==
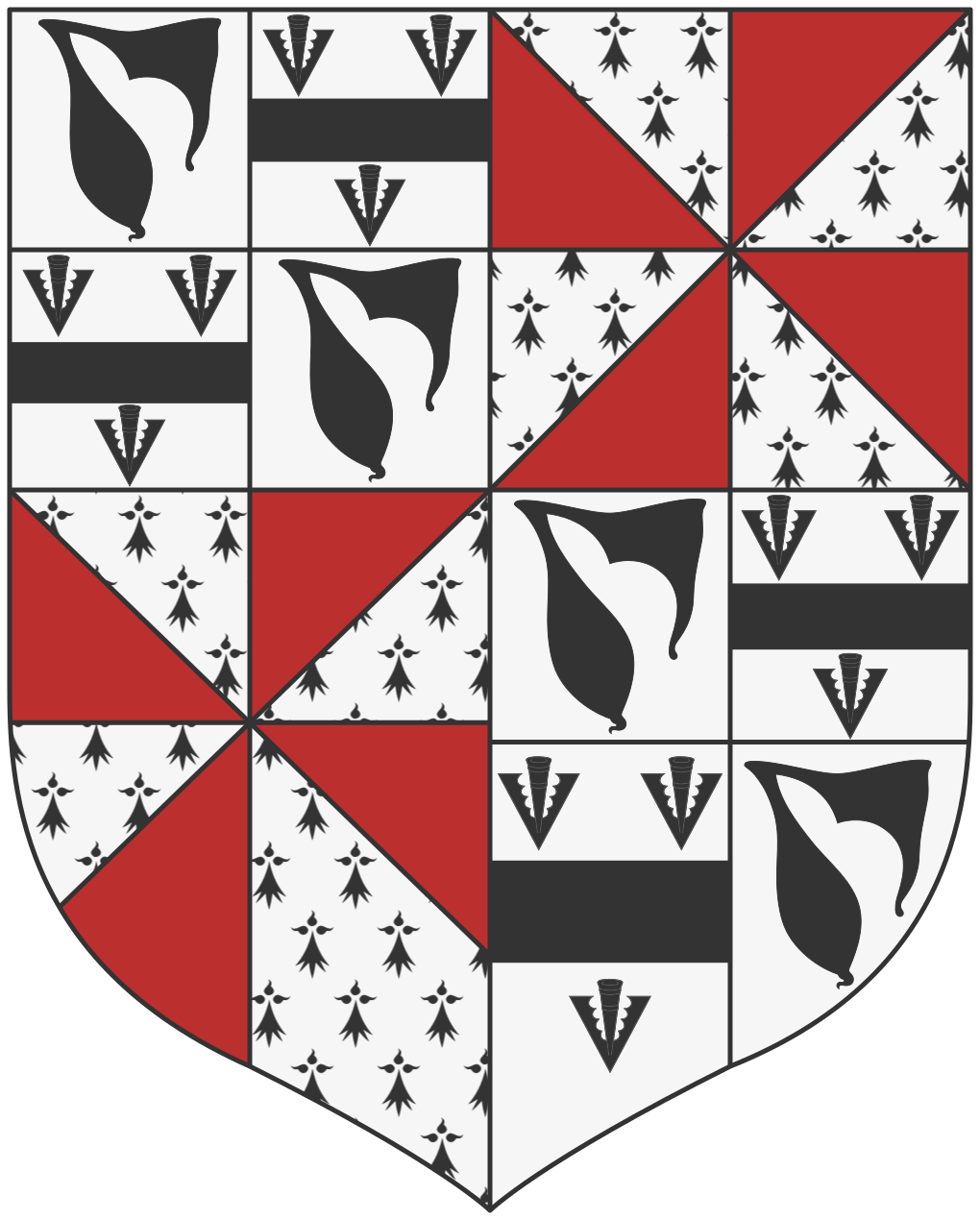
The coat of arms of the Marquesses of Hastings and Earls of Loundon.

- Francis Rawdon-Hastings, 1st Marquess of Hastings, 2nd Earl of Moira, 2nd Baron Rawdon, 5th Baronet (1754–1826)
- George Augustus Francis Rawdon-Hastings, 2nd Marquess of Hastings, 7th Earl of Loudoun, 3rd Earl of Moira, 3rd Baron Rawdon, 6th Baronet (1808–1844)
- Paulyn Reginald Serlo Rawdon-Hastings, 3rd Marquess of Hastings, 8th Earl of Loudoun, 4th Earl of Moira, 4th Baron Rawdon, 7th Baronet (1832–1851)
- Henry Weysford Charles Plantagenet Rawdon-Hastings, 4th Marquess of Hastings, 9th Earl of Loudoun, 5th Earl of Moira, 5th Baron Rawdon, 8th Baronet (1842–1868)

The 2nd Marquess inherited the Earldom of Loudoun from his mother. Since he failed to have any children, the 4th Marquess was succeeded to the Earldom of Loudoun and other baronies by his eldest sister Edith while the Earldom of Moira and the marquessate became extinct. Edith and the 4th Marquess were children of the 2nd Marquess.
