= Gunther Plüschow =

German aviator

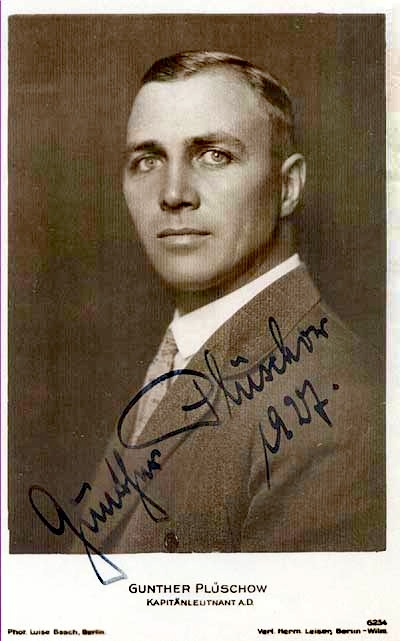
Gunther Plüschow in 1927

Gunther Plüschow (February 8, 1886 – January 28, 1931) was a German aviator, aerial explorer, and author from Munich, Bavaria. His feats include the only escape by a German prisoner of war in either world war from Britain back to Germany; he was the first man to explore and film Tierra del Fuego and Patagonia from the air. He died after his second aerial expedition to Patagonia in 1931 in a plane crash. As an aviator and explorer, he is honoured as a hero by the Argentine Air Force to this day.

== Antecedents ==
Gunther Plüschow was the son of Hermione and Eduard Plüschow, a journalist. His grandfather was an illegitimate son of a Grand Duke of Mecklenburg-Schwerin; his uncle Wilhelm became the photographer Guglielmo Plüschow.

== World War I ==
When the First World War began in August 1914, Lieutenant Plüschow was assigned to the East Asian Naval Station at Tsingtau, then part of the German Kiautschou Bay concession in China. Two Taube airplanes had been shipped in crates from Imperial Germany. After supervising the assembly of the planes, Plüschow began serving as pilot and aerial observer. The second plane, flown by Lt. Friedrich Müllerskowski, soon crashed, leaving Plüschow to fly alone. A Japanese ultimatum on August the 15th demanding the German evacuation of Kiautschou Bay was understandably ignored, and eight days later Japan declared war against Germany. Japanese and British forces then jointly besieged the German colony. By November 1914, the military situation at Kiautschou Bay had become untenable, and on November 6 Plüschow (who had flown reconnaissance and had downed a Japanese aircraft with his pistol) was ordered to fly out in his Taube, carrying the last dispatches and documents from the governor. After flying about 250 kilometres (160 mi) in his much-repaired airplane, Plüschow crashed into a rice paddy. He set fire to the Taube, then started for Germany on foot.

=== Escape from China ===
Plüschow walked to Daschou, where the local mandarin gave a party for him. He managed to obtain a pass to cross China, as well as a junk in which he sailed down a river, finally arriving safely at Nanking.

Plüschow sensed that he was being watched, even by officials openly friendly to Germany. As he was about to be arrested, he leapt in to a rickshaw and went to the railway station, where he bribed a guard and slipped on a train to Shanghai.

In Shanghai, Plüschow met a friend who provided him with documents as a Swiss national, as well as money and a ticket on a ship sailing to Nagasaki, Honolulu, and, finally, to San Francisco. In January 1915, he crossed the United States to New York City. He was reluctant to approach the German consulate there, as he had entered the country under a false identity. Worse, he read in a newspaper that he was presumed to be in New York.

His luck saved him again. He met a friend from Berlin who managed to get him travel documents for a ship that sailed on January 30, 1915, for Italy. After crossing the Atlantic Plüschow's ship docked at Gibraltar, where the British arrested him as an enemy alien. They soon discovered he was the famous aviator of Tsingtau.

=== Escape from London ===
On May 1, 1915, Plüschow was sent to a prisoner of war camp in Donington Hall in Leicestershire. On July 4, 1915, he escaped during a storm and headed for London. Scotland Yard issued an alert, asking the public to be on the lookout for a man with a "dragon tattoo" on his arm.

Disguised as a worker, Plüschow felt safe enough to take souvenir photographs of himself at the London docks. He occupied his time by reading books about Patagonia, and also visited the British Museum.

For security reasons, no notices were published announcing the departure of ships, but by observing the river he saw the ferry Princess Juliana, sailing for the neutral Netherlands and snuck on board. He arrived safely and finally reached Germany, where he was at first arrested as a spy since no one believed he could have accomplished such a feat. Plüschow is the only German combatant during either World War to have successfully escaped from a British prison camp.

=== Return to Germany ===
Once he was identified, Plüschow was acclaimed as "the hero from Tsingtau". He was decorated, promoted, and assigned command of the naval base at Libau in occupied Latvian Courland. In June 1916, in an aeroplane hangar at Libau, Plüschow married. He also wrote his first book, The Adventures of the Aviator from Tsingtau, which sold more than 700,000 copies. In 1918, his son, Guntolf Plüschow, was born.

1918 was a year of profound crisis in Germany. In November, Wilhelm II, German Emperor, was forced to flee to the Netherlands as his nation dissolved into chaos. In 1919, the Treaty of Versailles was impressed upon Germany, and Germans unhappy with the outcome held several military and civil revolts. Kapitänleutnant ( lieutenant) Plüschow refused to participate. Instead, at age 33, he reluctantly resigned from the Reichsmarine.

== South American explorations ==
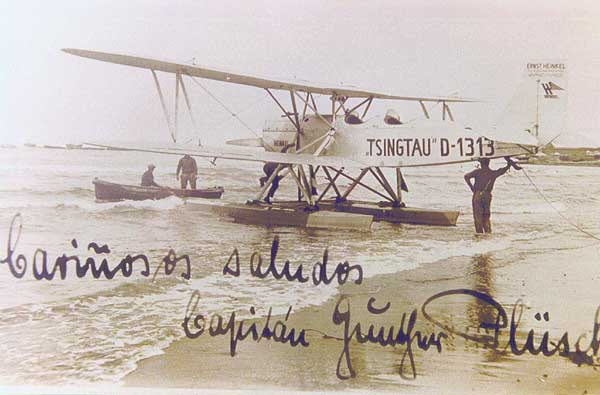
Plüschow's seaplane, Heinkel HD 24 Tsingtau

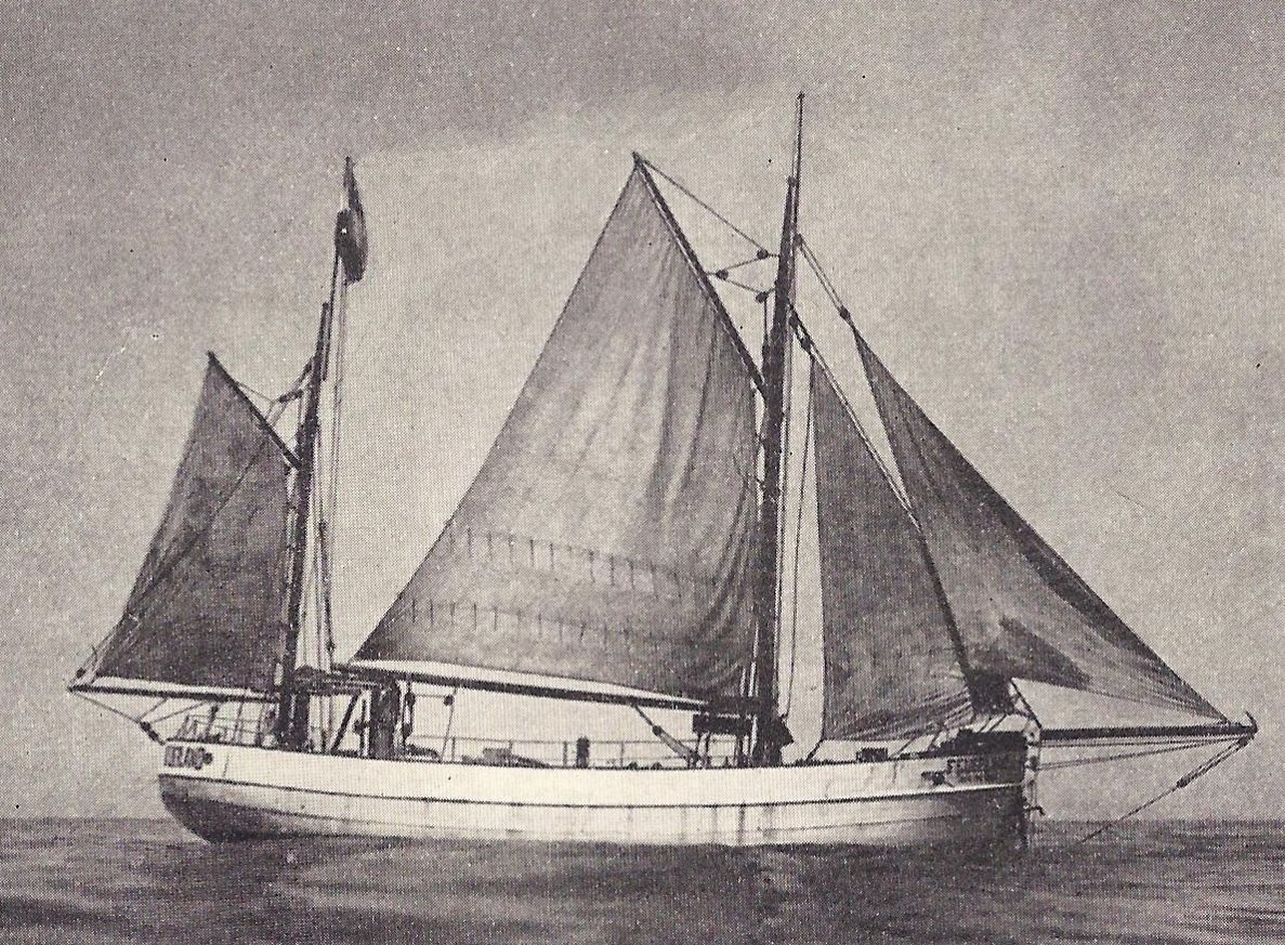
Plüschow's expedition ship Feuerland of 1928 at the Atlantic Ocean

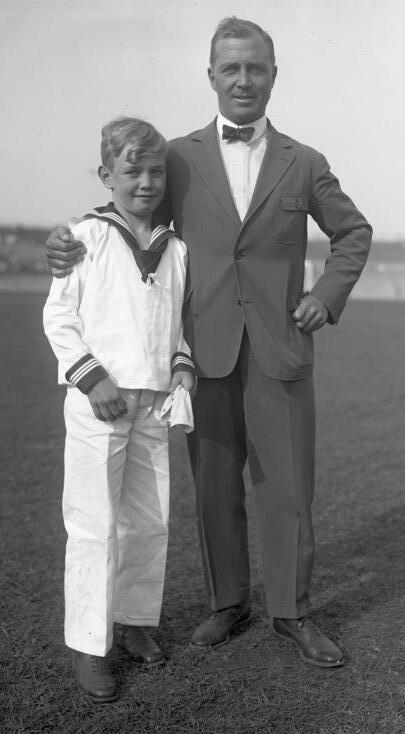
Plüschow with his son, shortly before his fatal crash

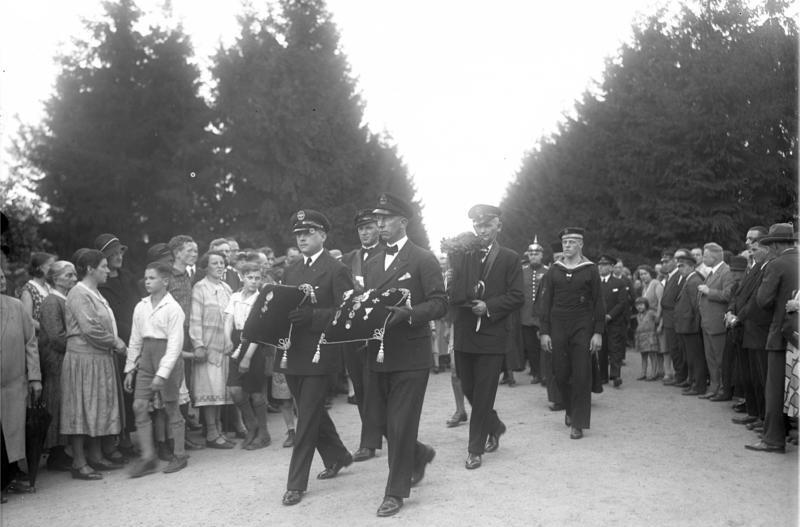
Funeral procession at Parkfriedhof [cemetery] Berlin-Lichterfelde

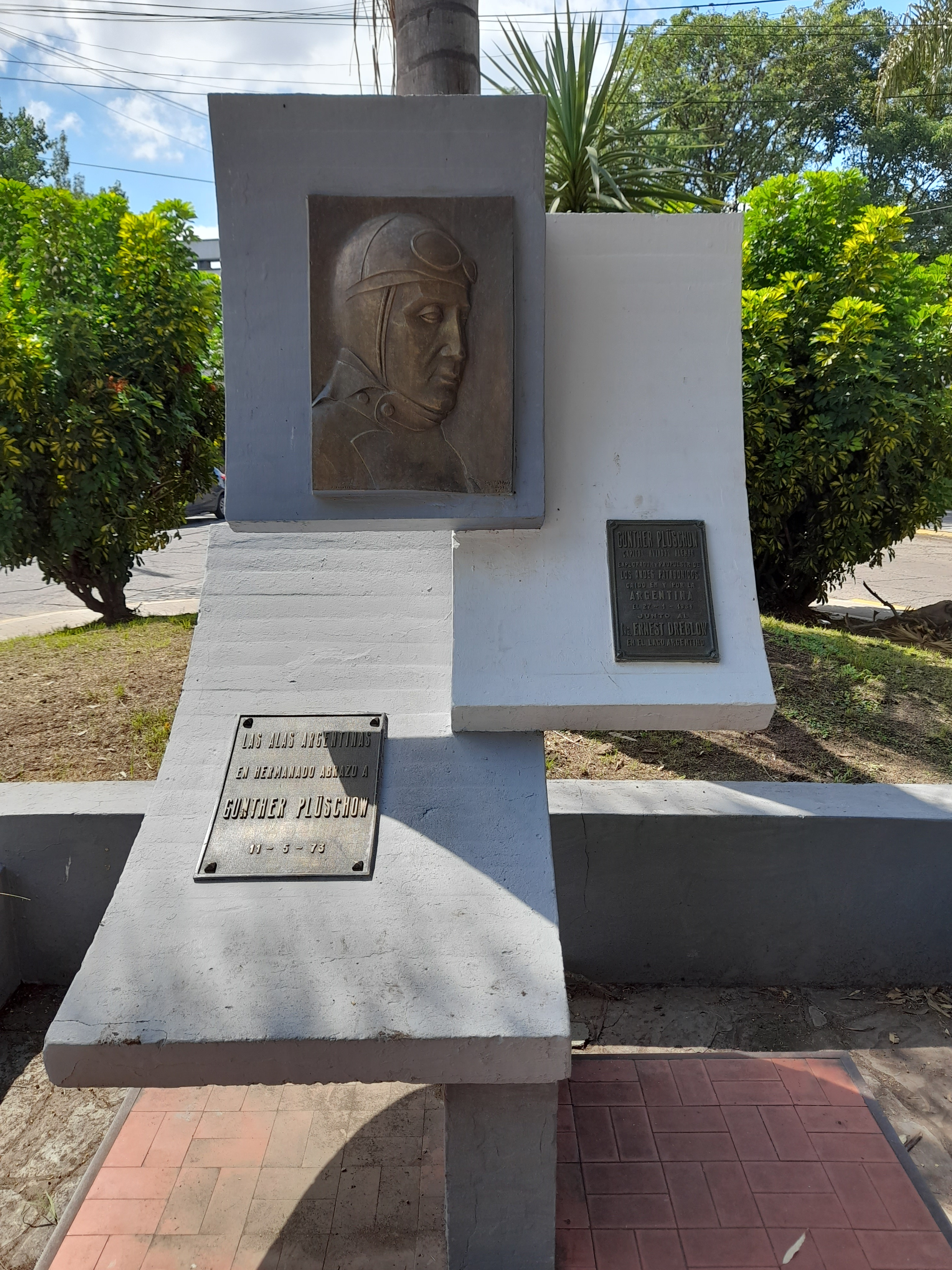
Memorial to Plüschow

After he left the Navy, Plüschow worked at various jobs before he was hired on the sailing vessel Parma, bound for South America. The ship took him around Cape Horn to Valdivia, Chile; he then traveled overland across Chile to Patagonia. On his return to Germany, he published Segelfahrt ins Wunderland ("Voyage to Wonderland"), which earned him enough for further explorations.

On November 27, 1927, Plüschow took the wooden two-masted cutter Feuerland to Punta Arenas, Chile. His engineer, Ernst Dreblow, brought his seaplane, a Heinkel HD 24 D-1313, aboard a steamer. By December 1928, the aircraft had been fully assembled and the inaugural flight brought the first air mail from Punta Arenas to Ushuaia, Argentina. In the months following, Plüschow and Dreblow were the first to explore by air the Cordillera Darwin, Cape Horn, the Southern Patagonian Ice Field, and the Torres del Paine of Patagonia. In 1929, Plüschow had to sell the Feuerland to obtain funds to return to Germany. There he published his explorations and photographs in a book, Silberkondor über Feuerland ("Silver Condor over Tierra del Fuego"), and a documentary film of the same name. The ship Feuerland was brought to Weddell Island and sailed between the islands of the Falkland archipelago until 2006, when she was transported back to Germany and listed as a historic cultural monument.

In 1930 Plüschow returned to Patagonia to continue his explorations. There, both he and Dreblow were killed in a crash near the Brazo Rico, part of Lake Argentino, on January the 28th, 1931.

== Honours and awards ==
The Gunther Plüschow Glacier in Tierra del Fuego is named in his memory.

Awards include:

- Ottoman Medal of Arts and Science
- Liyakat Medal (Ottoman Empire)
- Iron Cross (1914), First and Second Classes
- Knight's Cross of the Royal House Order of Hohenzollern with Swords
- Knight's Cross Second Class of the Order of the Zähringer Lion, with Oak Leaves and Swords (Baden)
- Military Merit Order with Swords, Fourth Class (Bavaria)
- Military Merit Cross, First and Second Classes (Mecklenburg-Schwerin)

== Books by Plüschow ==
- My escape from Donington Hall by Kapitänleutnant Gunther Plüschow, of the German Air Service; published by John Lane, Bodley Head Ltd., London, 1922; autobiographical book telling the story of (full title): My escape from Donington Hall preceded by an account of the siege of Kiao-Chow in 1914;(download)
- Escape from England, Gunther Plüschow, Ripping Yarns.com, ISBN 1-904466-21-4, a 2004 English language reprint of My Escape from Donington Hall.
- Plüschow, Gunther (2014), The Aviator of Tsingtao, Camphor Press, ISBN 978-1-910736-02-9. Reprint of My Escape from Donington Hall with a new introduction by Anton Rippon.
- Segelfahrt ins Wunderland, Gunther Plüschow. Berlin: Ullstein Verlag, 1926.
- Silberkondor über Feuerland, Gunther Plüschow. Berlin: Ullstein Verlag, 1929, new edition: Prager Bücher, ISBN 3-925769-07-2

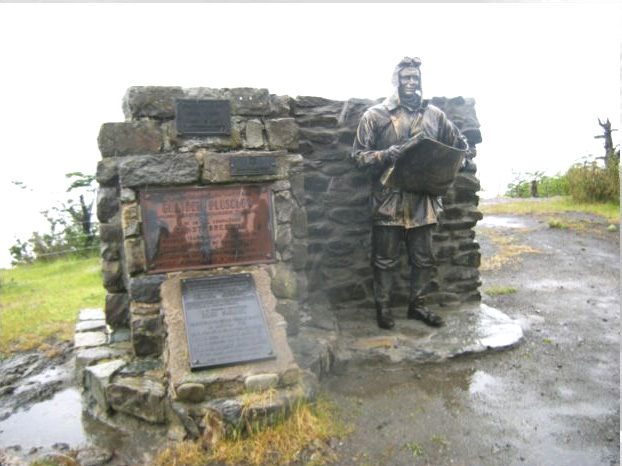
Plüschow Memorial at Argentino Lake (Patagonia) ca. 2010

== Movies by Plüschow ==
- Gunther Plüschow: Silberkondor über Feuerland, documentary, 1929. -- https://digitaler-lesesaal.bundesarchiv.de/en/video/2229/641585

Posthumously:

- Ikarus, 1931
- Fahrt ins Land der Wunder und Wolken, released after 1931

== Literature about Plüschow ==
- Litvachkes, Roberto (2006). Gunther Plüschow: Una Vida de Sueños, Aventuras y Desafíos por una Amor Imposible: La Patagonia! - Ein Leben voller Träume, Abenteuer und Herausforderungen, für eine unmögliche Liebe: Das unzähmbare Patagonien. German-English-Spanish-Portuguese with a DVD with the original film from G. Plüschow filmed in 1929, 127 minutes duration, ISBN 987-21760-1-9
- Rippon, Anton (2009). Gunther Plüschow: Airman, Escaper and Explorer. ISBN 978-1-84884-132-1
- Whittaker, Robert E. (1994). Dragon Master: The Kaiser's One-Man Air Force in Tsingtau, China, 1914. ISBN 978-0-9639310-1-6

== See also ==
- Franz von Werra, a Luftwaffe pilot who escaped from a Canadian prisoner of war camp during World War II and who subsequently returned to active service in Germany.
