= Edith Rawdon-Hastings, 10th Countess of Loudoun =

British noble (1833–1874)

The Right Honourable The Countess of Loudoun
- 10th Countess of Loudoun
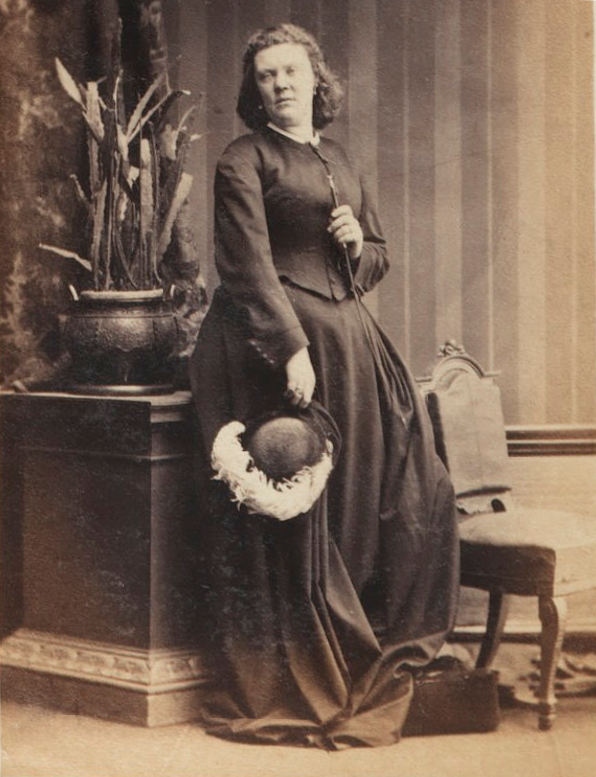
- The Countess in 1861
- Predecessor: Henry Rawdon-Hastings, 9th Earl of Loudoun
- Successor: Charles Clifton, 11th Earl of Loudoun
- Born: Lady Edith Maud Rawdon-Hastings; 10 December 1833
- Died: 23 January 1874 (aged 40)
- Spouses: Charles Clifton, 1st Baron Donington (after 1853)
- Issue: Flora Fitzalan-Howard, Duchess of Norfolk; Charles Clifton, 11th Earl of Loudoun; The Hon. Paulyn Rawdon-Hastings; Gilbert Clifton-Hastings-Campbell, 3rd Baron Donington; Henry Clifton; Lady Egidia Clifton
- Parents: George Rawdon-Hastings, 2nd Marquess of Hastings; Barbara Yelverton, 20th Baroness Grey de Ruthyn

Edith Maud Rawdon-Hastings, 10th Countess of Loudoun (10 December 1833 – 23 January 1874) was a Scottish peeress. She died aged 40 after caring for Rowallan Castle. Sir George Gilbert Scott designed an Eleanor Cross style monument to her which was erected in Ashby de la Zouch.

== Early life ==
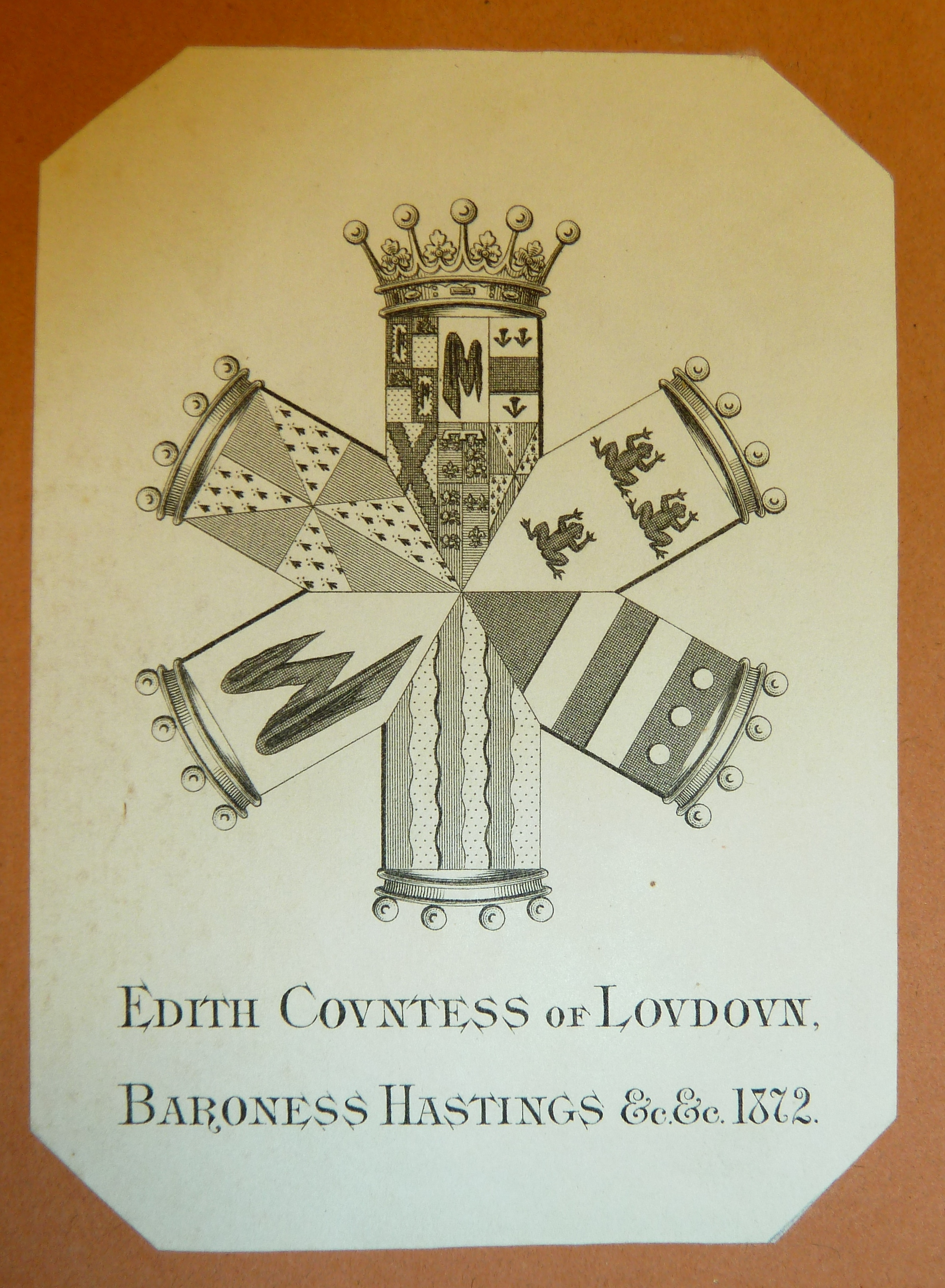
Her bookplate

Rawdon-Hastings was the second child and eldest daughter of George Rawdon-Hastings, 2nd Marquess of Hastings, the British peer and courtier, and his wife Barbara née Yelverton, 20th Baroness Grey de Ruthyn. Her elder brother was Paulyn Rawdon-Hastings, 3rd Marquess of Hastings, who died unmarried. Among her younger siblings were Lady Bertha Rawdon-Hastings (wife of Augustus Wykeham Clifton), Lady Victoria Rawdon-Hastings, Henry Rawdon-Hastings (who married Lady Florence Paget, daughter of Henry Paget, 2nd Marquess of Anglesey), and Lady Frances Rawdon-Hastings (wife of Charles Marsham, 4th Earl of Romney). Fifteen months after her father's death in 1844, her mother married Capt. Hastings Henry, nephew of the Duke of Leinster, who took the name of Yelverton by royal license in 1849. From her mother's second marriage, she had a younger half-sister, Hon. Barbara Yelverton, who later married John Yarde-Buller, 2nd Baron Churston.

Her mother, who inherited the barony when only seven months old, was the only child of Henry Yelverton, 19th Baron Grey de Ruthyn (a friend of Lord Byron) and the former Anna Maria Kellam. Her paternal grandparents were Francis Rawdon-Hastings, 1st Marquess of Hastings and his wife, Flora Mure-Campbell, 6th Countess of Loudoun.

== Career ==
She was greatly attached to the old Mure family mansion of Rowallan Castle near Kilmaurs in Ayrshire, and funded restorations of it.

In 1866, Rawdon-Hastings drew a picture which she called "Skeleton Ball". This picture is now in the Tate.

== Personal life ==
On 30 April 1853, she married Charles Clifton. The couple took the surname of Abney-Hastings, as a condition of inheriting from a second cousin Sir Charles Abney-Hastings, 2nd Bt, a natural grandson of the 10th Earl of Huntingdon (brother of Lady Edith's grandmother).^{,}^{.} They had six children:

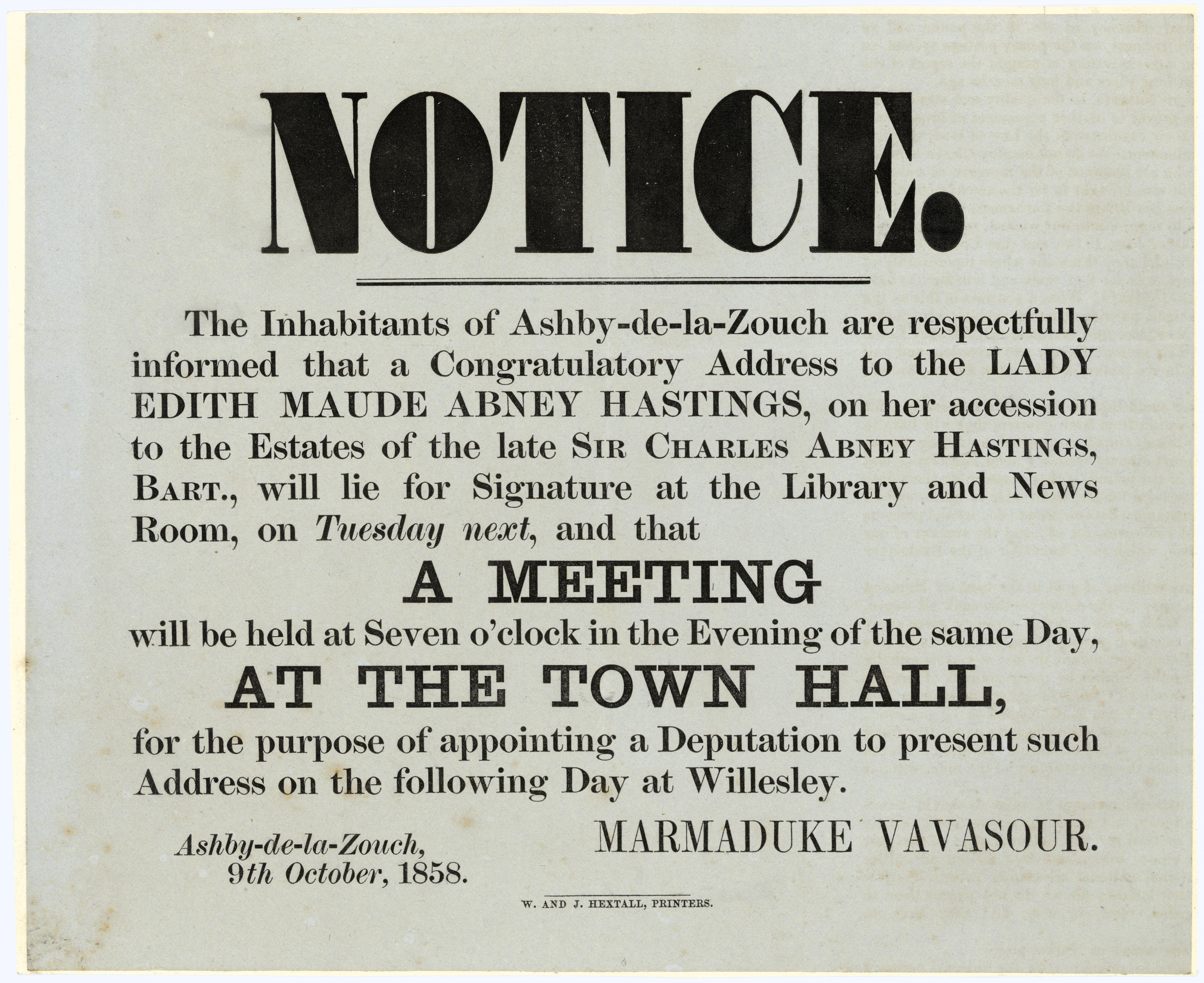
1858 advertisement for a Congratulatory Address to Lady Edith Maude Abney Hastings after she inherited the estates of Sir Charles Abney-Hastings.

- Lady Flora Paulyna Hetty Barbara Abney Hastings (1854–1887), who married Henry Fitzalan-Howard, 15th Duke of Norfolk.
- Charles Edward Hastings Clifton, 11th Earl of Loudoun (1855–1920), who married the Hon. Alice Fitzalan-Howard, daughter of Edward Fitzalan-Howard, 1st Baron Howard of Glossop (himself the second son of Henry Howard, 13th Duke of Norfolk), in 1880.
- Hon. Paulyn Francis Cuthbert Rawdon-Hastings (1856–1907), a Major who married Lady Maud Grimston, daughter of James Grimston, 2nd Earl of Verulam, whose children include Edith Abney-Hastings, 12th Countess of Loudoun.
- Gilbert Theophilus Clifton Clifton-Hastings-Campbell, 3rd Baron Donington (1859–1927), who married Maud Kemble Hamilton, daughter of Sir Charles Hamilton, 1st Baronet.
- Hon. Henry Cecil Plantagenet Clifton (b. 1860), who married Maharaja Duleep Singh's companion and was subsequently ostracised when the party went in exile.
- Lady Egidia Sophia Frederica Christina Clifton (1870–1892), who died young.

Edith died on 23 January 1874 and was buried in the churchyard at Castle Donington, except for her right hand, which – at her own request – was buried in the parkland of her home at Donington Hall. After she died, the Loudoun monument was erected in Ashby. The octagonal monument by Sir George Gilbert Scott is based on the Eleanor crosses and is now a Grade II* listed structure. After Edith's death, her widowed husband was created Baron Donington.

=== Descendants ===
Through her son Paulyn, she was a grandmother of Edith Abney-Hastings, later 12th Countess of Loudoun.

Through her son Gilbert, she was a grandmother of four granddaughters, including Hon. Selina Clifton-Hastings-Campbell, who married Sir Edward McTaggart-Stewart, 2nd Baronet.

Peerage of Scotland
| Preceded by Henry Rawdon-Hastings | Countess of Loudoun; 1868–1874 | Succeeded by Charles Clifton |
Peerage of England
| Preceded by abeyant last held by Henry Rawdon-Hastings | Baron Hastings; Baron Botreaux; Baron Hungerford; Baron De Moleyns; 1871–1874 | Succeeded by abeyant next held by Charles Rawdon-Hastings |
