= Barbara Rawdon-Hastings, Marchioness of Hastings =

The Most Honourable The Marchioness of Hastings
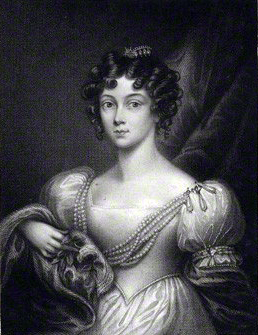
- Portrait published in 1828
- Born: Barbara Yelverton; 20 May 1810; Brandon, Warwickshire, England
- Died: 18 November 1858 (aged 48)
- Occupations: Fossil collector, geological author
- Spouses: George Rawdon-Hastings, 2nd Marquess of Hastings (m. 1831; died 1844) Hastings Reginald Henry (m. 1845)
- Children: Paulyn Rawdon-Hastings, 3rd Marquess of Hastings; Edith Rawdon-Hastings, 10th Countess of Loudoun; Bertha Clifton, 22nd Baroness Grey de Ruthyn; Lady Victoria Rawdon-Hastings; Henry Rawdon-Hastings, 4th Marquess of Hastings; Frances Marsham, Countess of Romney; Barbara Yarde-Buller, Baroness Churston
- Parent(s): Henry Yelverton, 19th Baron Grey de Ruthyn; Anna Maria Kellam

Barbara Rawdon-Hastings, Marchioness of Hastings, 20th Baroness Grey de Ruthyn (née Yelverton; 20 May 1810 – 18 November 1858) was a fossil collector and geological author.

== Early life ==
Born at Brandon House in Brandon, Warwickshire, Barbara Yelverton was the only child of Henry Yelverton, 19th Baron Grey de Ruthyn (1780–1810), and of his wife, Anna Maria Kellam (1792–1875). Her father was a friend of "mad, bad, and dangerous to know" Lord Byron, who referred to the new bride as "a rustic". At seven months, her father's death made her Baroness Grey de Ruthyn. Little is known of her early life or education.

In 1817, she was living in Derbyshire, in the (now lost) stately home Castlefields, owned by the Borrow family.

== Personal life ==
On 1 August 1831, Lady Grey de Ruthyn married George Rawdon-Hastings, 2nd Marquess of Hastings (1808–1844), and they had six children together:

- Paulyn Reginald Serlo Rawdon-Hastings, 3rd Marquess of Hastings (1832–1851), who died unmarried.
- Lady Edith Maud Rawdon-Hastings, later 10th Countess of Loudoun (1833–1874), who married Charles Frederick Abney-Hastings, 1st Baron Donington.
- Lady Bertha Lelgarde Rawdon-Hastings, later 22nd Baroness Grey de Ruthyn (1835–1887), who married Augustus Wykeham Clifton.
- Lady Victoria Maria Louisa Rawdon-Hastings (1837–1888)
- Henry Weysford Charles Plantagenet Rawdon-Hastings, 4th Marquess of Hastings (1842–1868), who married Lady Florence Paget, only daughter of Henry Paget, 2nd Marquess of Anglesey.
- Lady Frances Augusta Constance Muir Rawdon-Hastings (1844–1910), married Charles Marsham, 4th Earl of Romney.

On 9 April 1845, fifteen months after her first husband's death, she married secondly Captain Hastings Reginald Henry RN (1808–1878), who in 1849 took the name of Yelverton by royal license. They settled at Efford House near Lymington and had one daughter, Barbara Yelverton (12 January 1849 – 1 October 1924), who married John Yarde-Buller, 2nd Baron Churston.

During her first marriage, Lady Hastings was nicknamed "the jolly fast marchioness", as she was fond of foreign travel and gambling.

== Fossil collector and geologist ==
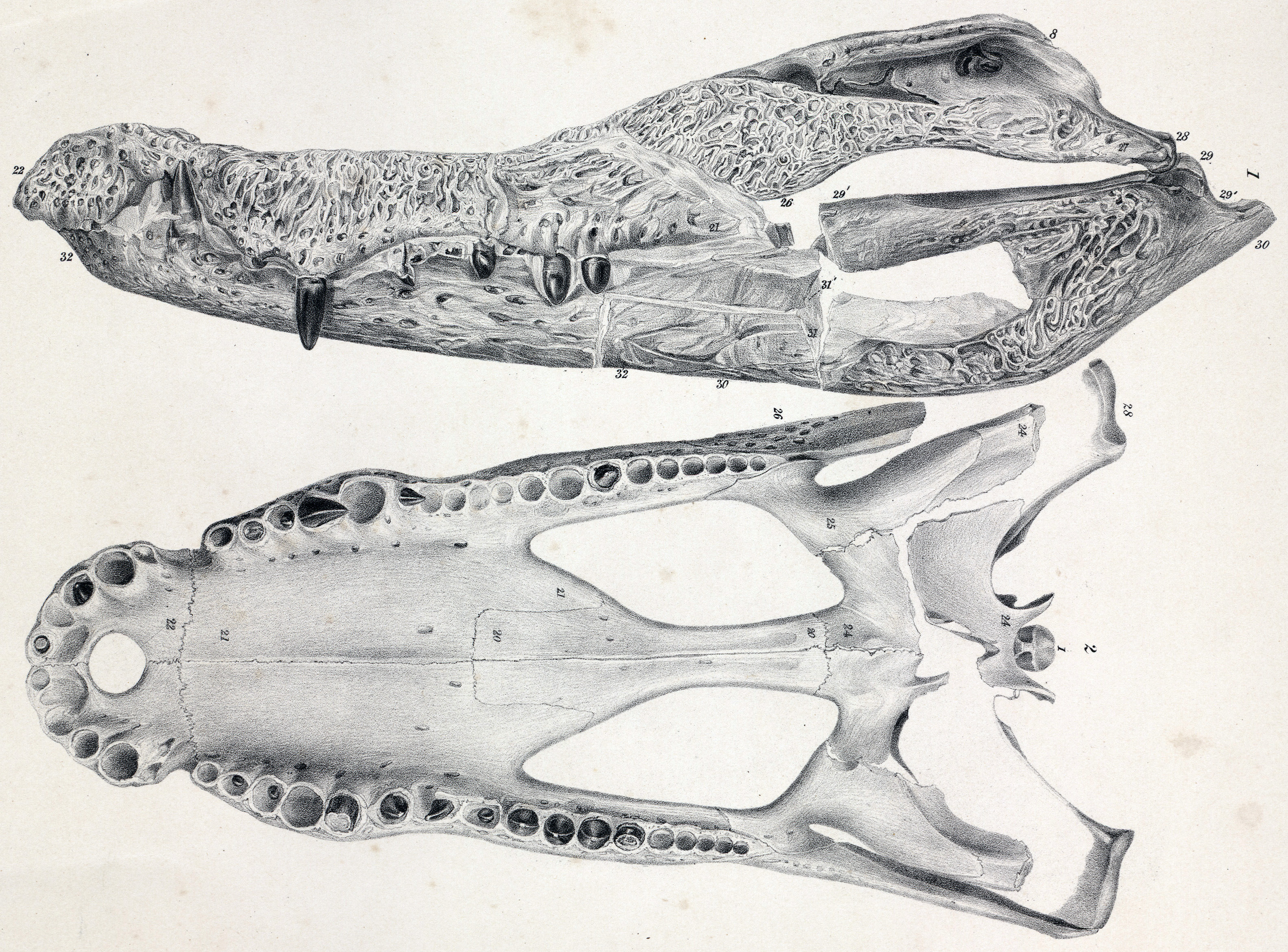
Skull of Crocodilus hastingsae (now Diplocynodon)

Lady Hastings was a collector of fossils, specializing in vertebrates. Since 1855 her collection has been housed in the British Museum, containing specimens found in Europe. The palaeontologist and anatomist Professor Richard Owen wrote of the thousands of fossils previously in her private museum at Efford House, among them "some of the finest in the world". Her knowledge of local geology, especially of the Eocene, and her meticulous work on fossil remains, gave her an expertise which was respected by scholars. Lady Hastings associated with many eminent scientists during her lifetime, including Edward Forbes, Charles Lyell, Alexander Falconer, William Buckland and Richard Owen. The geologist Forbes referred to her as a "fossilist" and acknowledged her work. Sixty-four of her letters to and from Owen are preserved in the Natural History Museum's Richard Owen Collection.

Owen proposed to name her discovered crocodile fossil, recovered from the Barton Beds at Hordle Cliff in Hampshire, Crocodilus hastingsae (now Diplocynodon) to honour "the accomplished lady by whom the singularly perfect example of the species had been recovered and restored".

In 1847, Lady Hastings presented her paper to the Oxford meeting of the British Association for the Advancement of Science, exhibiting two crocodile skulls and the shell of a turtle from Hordle Cliff. She argued that crocodile remains found on the Hampshire coast and also on the Isle of Wight showed that the area of the Solent had been a freshwater river or lake. Immediately after Richard Owen explained that the remains from Hordle suggested "a new genus of Pachyderm", which he named Paloplotherium, falling between Palaeotherium and Anoplotherium, during his presentation of the same fossils.

In 1852 and 1853 she published papers on the stratigraphy of Hordle Cliff (which she called the Hordwell cliff), the first such accurate accounts of it. She stated that her goal was to provide local information from which a comprehensive account of Tertiary stratigraphy could be created.

In 1858 she died in Rome and is buried there.

== Bibliography ==
- Owen, R. S., 'On the fossils obtained by the marchioness of Hastings from the freshwater Eocene beds of Hordle cliff', in Report of the British Association for the Advancement of Science (1848), pp. 65–6
- Hastings, B., 'On the freshwater Eocene beds of Hordle cliff, Hampshire', in Report of the British Association for the Advancement of Science (1848), pp. 63–64
- Hastings, Marchioness of, 'On the Tertiary beds of Hordwell, Hampshire', in London, Edinburgh, and Dublin Philosophical Magazine, 4th series, 6 (1853), pp. 1–10

Peerage of England
Preceded by Henry Yelverton	Baroness Grey de Ruthyn; 1810–1858	Succeeded by Henry Rawdon-Hastings
