= Henry Rawdon-Hastings, 4th Marquess of Hastings =

British peer

The Most Honourable The Marquess of Hastings
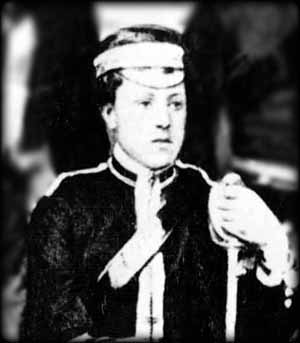
- Photograph of Lord Hastings as Lieutenant in the Leicestershire Yeomanry, 1861.

Personal details
- Born: Henry Weysford Charles Plantagenet Rawdon-Hastings; 22 July 1842
- Died: 10 November 1868 (aged 26)
- Spouse: Lady Florence Paget (m. 1864)
- Parent(s): George Rawdon-Hastings, 2nd Marquess of Hastings; Barbara Rawdon-Hastings, Marchioness of Hastings
- Relatives: Edith Rawdon-Hastings, 10th Countess of Loudoun (sister)

Henry Weysford Charles Plantagenet Rawdon-Hastings, 4th Marquess of Hastings and 9th Earl of Loudoun (22 July 1842 – 10 November 1868), styled Lord Henry Rawdon-Hastings from birth until 1851, was a British peer.

== Early life ==
Rawdon-Hastings was the second son of George Rawdon-Hastings, 2nd Marquess of Hastings, the British peer and courtier, and his wife Barbara née Yelverton, 20th Baroness Grey de Ruthyn. His father died when Hastings was only two years old, and he succeeded to his father's titles upon the early death of his older brother Paulyn seven years later, when he was aged nine. Later, in 1858, he also inherited his mother's barony, aged sixteen. His aunt was Lady Flora Hastings.

Hastings was also 21st Baron Grey of Ruthyn (created 1324), 20th Baron Botreaux (1368), 19th Baron Hungerford (1426), and 17th Baron Hastings (1461). He was also Earl of Moira, and in 1860 The Times reported that he was one of only three people holding peerages of all three Kingdoms, England, Scotland, and Ireland.

== Personal life ==
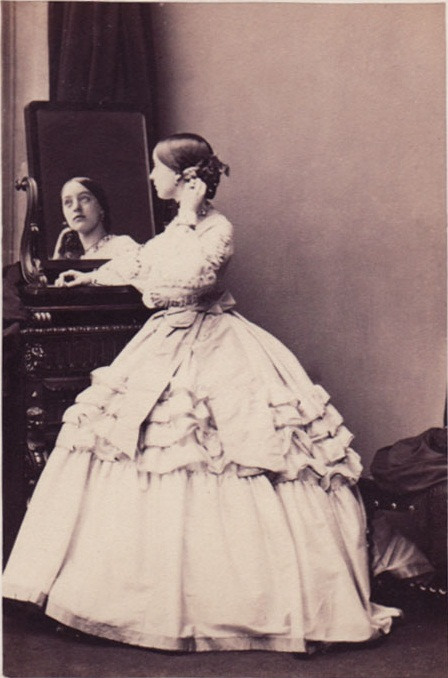
Lady Florence Paget by Camille Silvy.

In 1862, Lord Hastings became engaged to Alice March Phillipps de Lisle, but they never married (she later married the Hon. Arthur Strutt, younger son of Lord Belper).

=== Marriage to Lady Florence Paget ===
His best friend, Henry Chaplin was to be married to the society beauty Lady Florence Paget, a daughter of Henry Paget, 2nd Marquess of Anglesey: their wedding was expected to be the society event of the year, with the Prince of Wales one of many to offer his congratulations. However, during their engagement Florence had secretly fallen in love with Hastings.

On the evening of 15 July 1864, Hastings accepted an invitation to join Chaplin and Lady Florence in their opera box at Covent Garden for a performance of the opera Faust. Hastings was later said to have spent the evening looking moody and expressionless. The next morning, just before her wedding to Chaplin, Lady Florence unusually went out alone to Marshall & Snelgrove's on Oxford Street, with an excuse to her father that she wanted to buy something to add to her wedding outfit. Florence walked straight through the shop and out the other side, where Hastings was waiting for her in a carriage. They were married the same day. The marriage created a huge scandal as the bride had been engaged and was to be married that day to Chaplin. After the wedding, a reception was held in St James's Place before the newly married couple set off for their honeymoon at Donington Hall, Leicestershire, while the scandal died down. Florence Paget apologized to Chaplin by letter the next day, but the apology was rejected.

Over the years, Hastings's hatred and rivalry with Chaplin intensified, especially in their mutual interest, the world of horse racing; it climaxed at the 1867 Derby, centred on the chances of Chaplin's horse called Hermit. Hastings lost the sum of £120,000 (approximately £15 million by 2023 values) in betting against Chaplin's horse.

Hastings died in 1868, aged only 26, with no children. Although young, his death was not unexpected, and on the day before the Glasgow Evening Citizen noted

No hopes are entertained of the recovery of the Marquess of HASTINGS. The unfortunate nobleman is reported to be rapidly sinking under a complication of diseases.

The Marquessate of Hastings became extinct, while the Earldom of Loudoun passed to his eldest sister Lady Edith and his English baronies fell into abeyance between Lady Edith and their three other sisters – all would go to Edith except their mother's, which passed to the second sister, Lady Bertha.

After his death, his widow, Lady Florence, Marchioness of Hastings, would marry Sir George Chetwynd, 4th Baronet, on 9 July 1870.

Peerage of the United Kingdom
Preceded by Paulyn Rawdon-Hastings	Marquess of Hastings; 1851–1868	Extinct
Peerage of Scotland
Preceded by Paulyn Rawdon-Hastings	Earl of Loudoun; 1851–1868	Succeeded by Edith Rawdon-Hastings
Peerage of England
Preceded by Paulyn Rawdon-Hastings	Baron Hastings; Baron Botreaux; Baron Hungerford; Baron de Moleyns; 1851–1868	Succeeded by Abeyant; Title next held by Edith Rawdon-Hastings, 1871
Preceded by Barbara Rawdon-Hastings	Baron Grey of Ruthyn; 1858–1868	Succeeded by Abeyant; Title next held by Bertha Clifton, 1885
