= Earl of Loudoun =

Scottish royal title

Earldom of Loudoun
- Creation: 1633
- Created by: Charles I
- Peerage: Peerage of Scotland
- First holder: John Campbell, 2nd Lord Campbell of Loudoun
- Present holder: Simon Michael Abney-Hastings, 15th Earl of Loudoun
- Heir presumptive: Hon. Marcus William Abney-Hastings
- Subsidiary titles: Lord Campbell of Loudoun; Lord Tarrinzean and Mauchline

Earl of Loudoun (pronounced "loud-on" /ˈlaʊdən/), named after Loudoun in Ayrshire, is a title in the Peerage of Scotland. It was created in 1633 for John Campbell, 2nd Lord Campbell of Loudoun, along with the subsidiary title Lord Tarrinzean and Mauchline. The 1st Earl's wife Margaret was the granddaughter and heiress of Hugh Campbell, who had been created Lord Campbell of Loudoun; he resigned the peerage in favour of his grandson-in-law, who was later created an earl.

The 6th Countess married the 2nd Earl of Moira, who was later created Marquess of Hastings. The next three Earls also held that Marquessate. However, with the death of the 4th Marquess, the Marquessate became extinct, but the Earldom passed to the elder daughter of the 2nd Marquess.

The heir apparent to the Earldom uses the courtesy title Lord Mauchline.

== Lords Campbell of Loudoun (1601) ==
- Hugh Campbell, 1st Lord Campbell of Loudoun (d. 1622) (resigned in favour of his grandson-in-law c. 1619)
- John Campbell, 2nd Lord Campbell of Loudoun (1598–1662) (created Earl of Loudoun in 1633)

== Earls of Loudoun (1633) ==
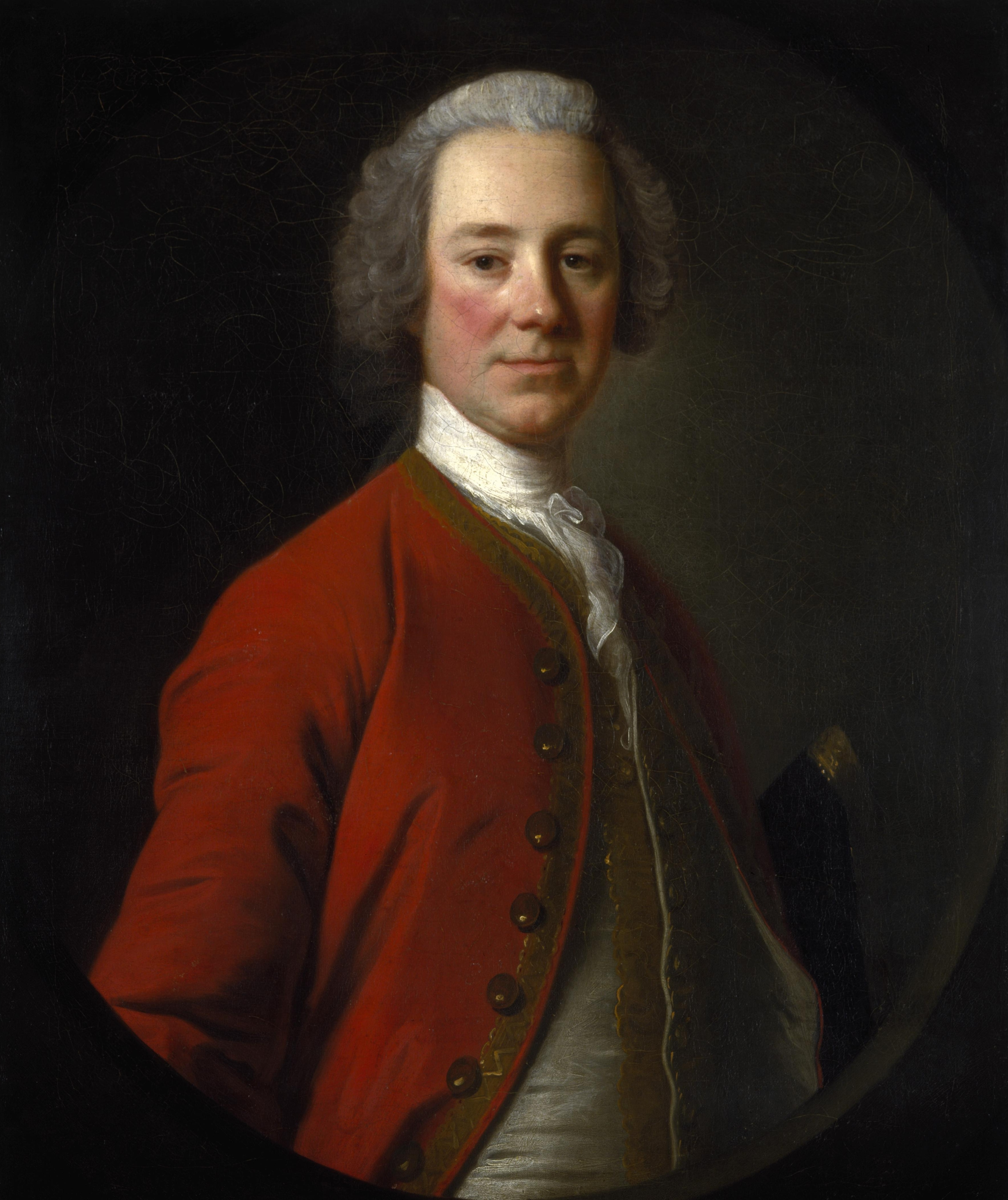
John Campbell, 4th Earl of Loudoun

- John Campbell, 1st Earl of Loudoun (1598–1662)
- James Campbell, 2nd Earl of Loudoun (d. 1684)
- Hugh Campbell, 3rd Earl of Loudoun (d. 1731)
- John Campbell, 4th Earl of Loudoun (1705–1782)
- James Mure-Campbell, 5th Earl of Loudoun (1726–1786)
- Flora Mure-Campbell, 6th Countess of Loudoun (1780–1840)
- George Augustus Francis Rawdon-Hastings, 2nd Marquess of Hastings, 7th Earl of Loudoun (1808–1844)
- Paulyn Reginald Serlo Rawdon-Hastings, 3rd Marquess of Hastings, 8th Earl of Loudoun (1832–1851)
- Henry Weysford Charles Plantagenet Rawdon-Hastings, 4th Marquess of Hastings, 9th Earl of Loudoun (1842–1868)
- Edith Maud Rawdon-Hastings, 10th Countess of Loudoun (1833–1874)
- Charles Edward Rawdon-Hastings, 11th Earl of Loudoun (1855–1920)
- Edith Maud Abney-Hastings, 12th Countess of Loudoun (1883–1960)
- Barbara Huddleston Abney-Hastings, 13th Countess of Loudoun (1919–2002)
- Michael Edward Abney-Hastings, 14th Earl of Loudoun (1942–2012)
- Simon Michael Abney-Hastings, 15th Earl of Loudoun (b. 1974)

The heir presumptive is the present holder's brother, the Hon. Marcus William Abney-Hastings (b. 1981).

== See also ==
- Marquess of Hastings
- Baron Donington
- Loudoun County, Virginia, named for the 4th Earl
