= Flora Mure-Campbell, Marchioness of Hastings =

British noble (1780–1840)

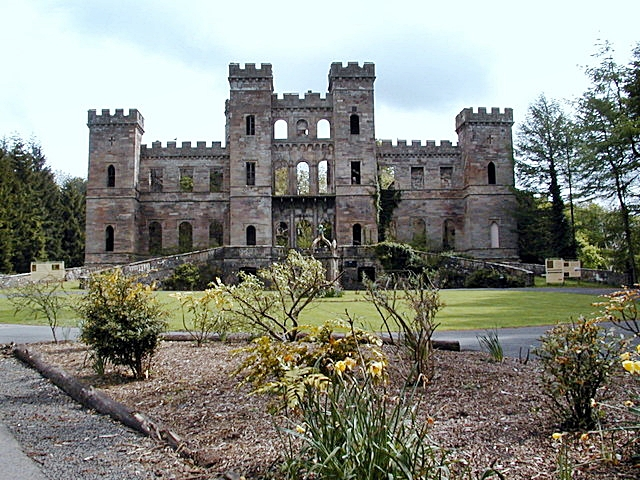
Loudoun Castle

Flora Mure-Campbell, Marchioness of Hastings and 6th Countess of Loudoun (1780 – 8 January 1840) was a British peer, the second daughter of James Mure-Campbell, 5th Earl of Loudoun and Lady Flora Macleod.

She married Francis Rawdon-Hastings, 2nd Earl of Moira, later the Governor-General of India, Governor of Malta and Marquess of Hastings, on 12 July 1804 and with him had six children:

- Lady Flora Elizabeth (1806–1839), died unmarried.
- Hon. Francis George Augustus (1807–1807), died in infancy.
- George Augustus Francis, styled Lord Rawdon, later Earl of Rawdon, later 2nd Marquess of Hastings (1808–1844)
- Lady Sophia Frederica Christina (1809–1859), married John Crichton-Stuart, 2nd Marquess of Bute and had issue.
- Lady Selina Constance (1810–1867), married Charles Henry, of Straffan.
- Lady Adelaide Augusta Lavinia (1812–1860), married Sir William Keith Murray.

Around 1807 she commissioned the building of Loudoun Castle in Ayrshire, to designs by Archibald Elliot.

Her husband died on 28 November 1826 aboard HMS Revenge off Naples, and, following his directions, his right hand was cut off to be buried with his wife when she died. This wish was complied with, and it now rests clasped with hers in the family vault at Loudoun Kirk.

Coat of arms of Flora Mure-Campbell, Marchioness of Hastings
Coronet A coronet of an Earl Crest An eagle with two necks displayed gules in a flame of fire proper. Escutcheon Gyronny of eight ermine and gules. Supporters Dexter: an armed man bearing a pick on his shoulder proper; Sinister: a lady richly attired with a signet letter in her sinister hand proper. Motto l byde my tyme

Peerage of Scotland
Preceded by James Campbell	Countess of Loudoun; 1786–1840	Succeeded by George Rawdon-Hastings
