= Baron Donington =

Extinct barony in the Peerage of the United Kingdom

Baron Donington, of Donington Park in the County of Leicester, was a title in the Peerage of the United Kingdom. It was created on 4 May 1880 for Charles Frederick Abney-Hastings. Born Charles Frederick Clifton, he was the widower of Edith Mary Abney-Hastings, 10th Countess of Loudoun. He and his wife had in 1859 assumed by Royal licence the surname of Abney-Hastings on succeeding to the Abney-Hastings estates after the death of his wife's kinsman Sir Charles Abney-Hastings, 2nd Baronet, in 1858 (see Abney-Hastings baronets). They were both succeeded by their eldest son Charles Edward Rawdon-Hastings, 11th Earl of Loudoun and 2nd Baron Donington. However, on his death in 1920, the titles separated. The Scottish earldom was inherited by his niece Edith, daughter of his second brother, Major The Hon. Paulyn Francis Cuthbert Rawdon-Hastings. The barony of Donington, which could only be inherited by male heirs, passed to his third brother, Gilbert Theophilus, who became the third Baron. He had four daughters but no sons, and on his death in 1927 the barony became extinct.

The first Baron was descended from John Clifton, brother of Sir Thomas Clifton, 1st Baronet (see Clifton baronets). Thomas Joseph Clifton, father of the first Baron, was High Sheriff of Lancashire in 1835 and a Justice of the Peace and Deputy Lieutenant for the county. John Talbot Clifton, brother of the first Baron, and his son Thomas Henry Clifton, both sat as Member of Parliament for North Lancashire. Thomas Henry Clifton, brother of the first Baron, was a Major-General in the British Army.

== Barons Donington (1880) ==
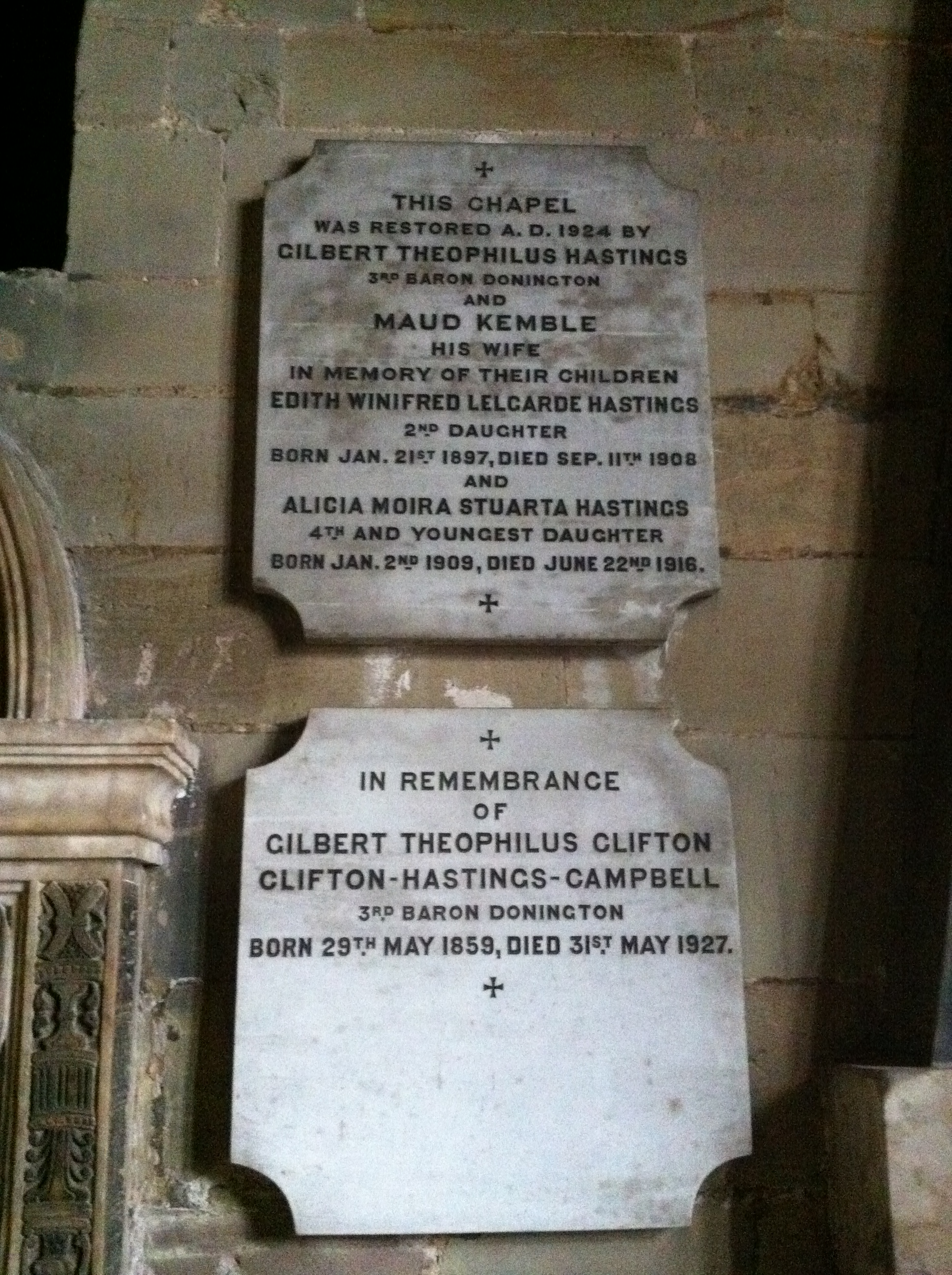
Memorial to Gilbert Theophilus Clifton Clifton-Hastings-Campbell, 3rd Baron Donington, in St Helen's Church, Ashby-de-la-Zouch

- Charles Frederick Abney-Hastings, 1st Baron Donington (1822–1895)
- Charles Edward Rawdon-Hastings, 11th Earl of Loudoun, 2nd Baron Donington (1855–1920)
- Gilbert Theophilus Clifton Clifton-Hastings-Campbell, 3rd Baron Donington (1859–1927)

== See also ==
- Earl of Loudoun
- Clifton baronets
- Abney-Hastings baronets
