= Baron Strange =

Title in the Peerage of England

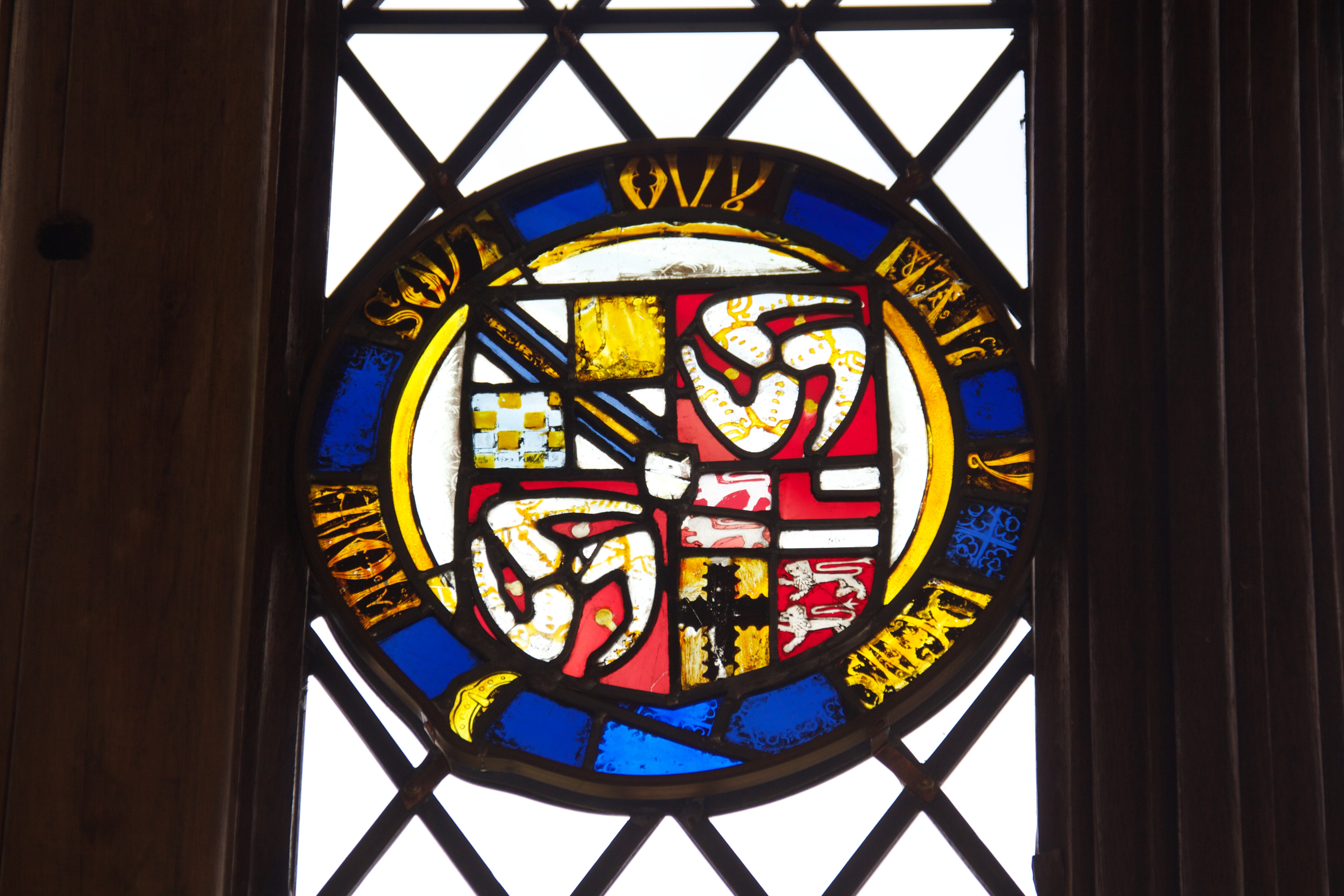
Arms of Stanley, with quarterings of Strange, King of Man, Woodville, Mohun, and de Warenne (Earl of Surrey), all circumscribed by the Garter. Possibly the arms of Thomas Stanley, 1st Earl of Derby(1435-1504), KG. Ordsall Hall, Salford

Baron Strange is a title which has been created four times in the Peerage of England. Two creations, one in 1295 and another in 1326, had only one holder each, upon whose deaths they became extinct. Two of the creations, that of 1299 and that of 1628, are extant. The surname Le Strange was Latinized as Extraneus (i.e. "Foreigner, Stranger"). The arms of Le Strange of Knockin Castle in Shropshire were: Gules, two lions passant argent.

All four baronies of Strange were created by writ, which means that they can also pass through female lines. Following the passing of the Peerage Act 1963, Elizabeth Frances Philipps, 14th Baroness Strange (of the 1299 creation), became the first female to take her seat in the House of Lords by virtue of an hereditary peerage.

== History ==
=== 1295 creation ===
The first creation came in 1295 when Roger le Strange "of Salop" (i.e. Shropshire) was summoned to the Model Parliament by writ addressed to Rogero Extraneo, by which he is deemed to have become Lord Strange. He was a younger son of John le Strange III of Knockin Castle in Shropshire, Sheriff of Shropshire and Staffordshire in 1236. On his death in 1311 the title became extinct.

=== 1299 creation ===
The second creation came in 1299 when John le Strange V was summoned to the House of Lords by a writ directed to Johanni Lestraunge de Knokyn, by which he is deemed to have become Lord Strange. This creation is referred to as Baron Strange de Knokyn or Baron Strange of Knokyn (aliter Knokin or Knockin, etc.), named after his seat of Knockin Castle in Shropshire, which thus distinguishes it from the earlier 1295 barony, which was still extant on its creation. He was the eldest son and heir of John le Strange IV of Knockin, the eldest son of John le Strange III of Knockin, and was therefore the nephew of the baron of the 1295 creation. Hamo le Strange, younger brother of the 2nd Baron, founded the family of Le Strange of Hunstanton, Norfolk (which ancestral manor was given to him by the 2nd Baron in 1309), and bore his paternal arms differenced by a bendlet sable. (See L'Estrange baronets of Hunstanton, created in 1629, which male line continued until 1762)). Joan le Strange, suo jure 9th Baroness, daughter and heiress of the 8th Baron who died without male issue, married George Stanley, 9th Baron Strange, son of Thomas Stanley, 1st Earl of Derby, who was summoned to Parliament as Lord Strange in her right. Her son Thomas Stanley succeeded as both 2nd Earl of Derby and 10th Baron Strange.

The titles remained united until the death of his great-grandson, the fifth Earl and 13th Baron, in 1594. The earldom was inherited by his younger brother, the sixth Earl, while the barony of Strange (as well as the baronies of Mohun of Dunster and Stanley, also held by the Earl) fell into abeyance between the late Earl's three daughters Lady Anne, Lady Frances and Lady Elizabeth (however, the sixth Earl of Derby erroneously assumed the barony of Strange - see below). The barony of Strange remained in abeyance for the next 327 years.

However, the abeyance was terminated in 1921 in favour of Elizabeth Frances Philipps, Viscountess St Davids, who became the fourteenth Baroness. She was the second wife of John Philipps, 1st Viscount St Davids. The abeyance of the ancient baronies of Hungerford and de Moleyns was terminated at the same time in her favour. On 31 July 1963, the Peerage Act 1963 came into effect, which, among other things, enabled women to sit and vote in the House of Lords by virtue of an hereditary peerage. Following the passage of the Act, Lady St Davids applied for a writ of summons to the House of Lords in right of her Strange barony, which was subsequently issued to her, and she took her seat in the House on 19 November 1963 as the first female peer to do so under the provision of the Peerage Act 1963. On her death in 1974 the titles were inherited by her son, the fifteenth Baron Strange, who had already succeeded his father as second Viscount St Davids. As of 2013 the titles are held by the second Viscount's grandson, the fourth Viscount and seventeenth Baron Strange.

=== 1326 creation ===
The third creation came in 1326 when Sir Eubulus le Strange was summoned to Parliament as Lord Strange. However, the title became extinct on his death in 1335. His nephew Roger le Strange, 4th Baron Strange of Knockyn, was his heir.

=== 1628 creation ===
In 1594 William Stanley, 6th Earl of Derby (1561-1642), following the death of his elder brother the 5th Earl of Derby, incorrectly assumed the title Baron Strange (created in 1299) (see above). In 1628 his son and heir apparent, James Stanley, 7th Earl of Derby, was summoned to the House of Lords through a writ of acceleration as Lord Strange. When it was discovered that his father's assumption of the barony was erroneous, it was deemed that there were two baronies of Strange, one created in 1299 then in abeyance, and another created "accidentally" in 1628. James Stanley later succeeded his father as 7th Earl of Derby.

The titles remained united until the death of his grandson, the ninth Earl and third Baron, in 1702. The earldom was inherited by the late Earl's younger brother, the tenth Earl, while the barony fell into abeyance between the Earl's two daughters, Lady Henrietta and Lady Elizabeth. On Lady Elizabeth's death in 1714 the abeyance was terminated in favour of Henrietta, who became the fourth Baroness. She married, firstly, John Annesley, 4th Earl of Anglesey, and after his death, secondly, John Ashburnham, 1st Earl of Ashburnham. Lady Strange was succeeded by her daughter from her second marriage, Henrietta Bridget, the fifth Baroness. However, she died unmarried at an early age and was succeeded by her aforementioned great-uncle, the tenth Earl of Derby, who became the sixth Baron Strange.

Lord Derby was childless and was succeeded in the barony by his first cousin once removed James Murray, 2nd Duke of Atholl, who became the seventh Baron Strange as well. He was the grandson of Lady Amelia Anne Sophia Stanley, daughter of James Stanley, 7th Earl of Derby. On his death the dukedom and barony separated. He was succeeded in the dukedom by his nephew John Murray, 3rd Duke of Atholl, while the barony passed to his daughter Charlotte, the eighth Baroness. She married her first cousin, the third Duke of Atholl. They were both succeeded by their son, the fourth Duke and ninth Baron. In 1786 he was created Earl Strange and Baron Murray of Stanley in the Peerage of Great Britain. The dukedom and barony remained united until the death of his great-great-grandson, the ninth Duke and fourteenth Baron, in 1957 (see the Duke of Atholl for more detailed information on the holders during this period and for later history of the title).

The barony of Strange fell into abeyance between the representatives of the three daughters of the fourth Duke of Atholl, Lady Charlotte, Lady Amelia Sophia and Lady Elizabeth. The abeyance was terminated by the Queen in 1965 in favour of John Drummond of Megginch, who became the fifteenth Baron. He was the great-grandson of Lady Charlotte and her second husband Admiral Sir Adam Drummond of Megginch. However, on his death in 1982 the peerage once again fell into abeyance, this time between his three daughters. It was called out of abeyance in 1986 in favour of the eldest daughter, Cherry, who became the sixteenth Baroness. She was the wife of Captain Humphrey ap Evans (1922–2009), who along with his wife assumed the name of Drummond of Megginch by decree of the Lord Lyon in 1965. Lady Strange was one of the ninety hereditary peers that were allowed to remain in the House of Lords after the passing of the House of Lords Act 1999. On her death in 2005 the title was inherited by her eldest son, the seventeenth and (as of 2017) present holder of the title.

The family seat was Megginch Castle, near Errol, Perthshire.

== Titleholders ==
=== Barons Strange, First Creation (1295) ===
- Roger le Strange, Baron Strange (d. 1311) (The second son of John Lestrange; another son, Robert, was the father of Fulk Strange of Blackmere)

=== Barons Strange (of Knockin), Second Creation (1299) ===
Arms of Strange de Knockin: Gules, two lions passant argent

- John le Strange V, 1st Baron Strange (c. 1254–1309)
- John le Strange VI, 2nd Baron Strange (c. 1282–1311)
- John le Strange, 3rd Baron Strange (c. 1297–1323)
- Roger le Strange, 4th Baron Strange (1301–1349), son of the 2nd Baron
- Roger le Strange, 5th Baron Strange (c. 1327–1382)
- John le Strange, 6th Baron Strange (c. 1350–1397)
- Richard le Strange, 7th Baron Strange (1381–1449), who married Elizabeth Cobham, sister of Eleanor, Duchess of Gloucester
- John le Strange, 8th Baron Strange (c. 1440–1477), who married Jacquetta Woodville, the sister of Elizabeth Woodville, queen consort of England
- Joan le Strange, 9th Baroness Strange (c. 1460–1514)
  - George Stanley, 9th Baron Strange (jure uxoris) (1460–1503)

Arms of Stanley: Argent, on a bend azure three buck's heads cabossed or

- Thomas Stanley, 2nd Earl of Derby, 10th Baron Strange (d. 1521)
- Edward Stanley, 3rd Earl of Derby, 11th Baron Strange (c. 1508–1572)
- Henry Stanley, 4th Earl of Derby, 12th Baron Strange (1531–1593)
- Ferdinando Stanley, 5th Earl of Derby, 13th Baron Strange (1559–1594) (abeyant 1594)
- Elizabeth Frances Philipps, 14th Baroness Strange (1884–1974) (abeyance terminated 1921)
- Jestyn Reginald Austen Plantagenet Philipps, 2nd Viscount St Davids, 15th Baron Strange (1917–1991)
- Colwyn Jestyn John Philipps, 3rd Viscount St Davids, 16th Baron Strange (1939–2009)
- Rhodri Colwyn Philipps, 4th Viscount St Davids, 17th Baron Strange (b. 1966)

=== Barons Strange, Third Creation (1326) ===
- Eubulus le Strange, 1st Baron Strange (died 1335)

=== Barons Strange, Fourth Creation (1628) ===
This barony was created by clerical error in 1628, confusing Lord Derby with the claimant of the older Barony Strange of Knockin (created in 1299). See Baronies created by error for details.

- James Stanley, 7th Earl of Derby, 1st Baron Strange (1607–1651)
- Charles Stanley, 8th Earl of Derby, 2nd Baron Strange (1628–1672)
- William Richard George Stanley, 9th Earl of Derby, 3rd Baron Strange (1655–1702) (abeyant 1702)
- Henrietta Stanley, 4th Baroness Strange (d. 1718) (became sole heir 1714)
- Henrietta Ashburnham, 5th Baroness Strange (d. 1732)
- James Stanley, 10th Earl of Derby, 6th Baron Strange (1664–1736)
- James Murray, 2nd Duke of Atholl, 7th Baron Strange (1690–1764)
- Charlotte Murray, 8th Baroness Strange, Duchess consort of Atholl (c. 1731–1805)
- John Murray, 4th Duke of Atholl, 9th Baron Strange (1755–1830)
- John Murray, 5th Duke of Atholl, 10th Baron Strange (1778–1846)
- George Augustus Frederick John Murray, 6th Duke of Atholl, 11th Baron Strange (1814–1864)
- John James Hugh Henry Stewart-Murray, 7th Duke of Atholl, 12th Baron Strange (1840–1917)
- John George Stewart-Murray, 8th Duke of Atholl, 13th Baron Strange (1871–1942)
- James Thomas Stewart-Murray, 9th Duke of Atholl, 14th Baron Strange (1879–1957) (abeyant 1957)
- John Drummond, 15th Baron Strange (1900–1982) (abeyance terminated 1965; abeyant 1982)
- (Jean) Cherry Drummond of Megginch, 16th Baroness Strange (1928–2005) (abeyance terminated 1986)
- Adam Humphrey Drummond of Megginch, 17th Baron Strange (b. 1953)

The heir apparent is the present holder's son Hon. John Adam Humphrey Drummond (b. 1992).

The style Lord Strange was used as a courtesy title by the Earls of Derby until James Stanley, Lord Strange (1716–1771), Chancellor of the Duchy of Lancaster; he was the son of Edward Stanley, 11th Earl of Derby, who (unlike his 6th cousin, the 10th Earl) did not hold the barony of Strange (it having passed to the Murray family). Nowadays the Earls of Derby use the courtesy title of Lord Stanley for heirs apparent.

== Family tree ==
Family tree of Dukes, Marquesses, and Earls of Atholl, Earls of Derby, 3rd (Stanley family) creation, and Earls of Dunmore

John Lestrange III d. 1269
Baron Strange (1st creation), of Salop, 1295
John Lestrange IV d. 1276	Roger le Strange d. 1311; 1st Baron Strange of Salop
Baron Strange (1st creation), of Salop extinct, 1311
Baron Strange (2nd creation), of Knockyn, 1295
John Le Strange V d. 1309; 1st Baron Strange of Knockyn
Baron Mohun of Dunster, 1299
John Le Strange VI c. 1282–1311; 2nd Baron Strange of Knockyn	John de Mohun d. 1330; 1st Baron Mohun
John Le Strange c. 1297–1323; 3rd Baron Strange of Knockyn	Roger Le Strange; 1301–1349; 4th Baron Strange of Knockyn	John de Mohun d. 1322
Earl of Atholl (4th creation), 1367
Roger Le Strange c. 1327–1382; 5th Baron Strange of Knockyn	John Mohun; 1320–1376; 2nd Baron Mohun	Robert Stewart; 1316–1390; 1st Earl of Atholl, Earl of Strathearn, Later King Robert II
Earl of Atholl (6th creation), 1403	Earl of Atholl (7th creation), 1404
John Beaufort c. 1373–1410; Earl of Somerset	John Le Strange c. 1350–1397; 6th Baron Strange of Knockyn	Maud Mohun	John Stewart c. 1337–1406; 2nd Earl of Atholl, Earl of Carrick, Later King Robert III	Robert Stewart; 1340–1420; Duke of Albany, Earl of Atholl	Walter Stewart c. 1360–1437; Earl of Atholl, Earl of Strathearn, Earl of Caithness
Earldom of Atholl (4th creation) merged in the crown, 1390	Earldom of Atholl (6th creation) expired, 1406	Earldom of Atholl (7th creation) attainted, 1404
Baron Stanley, 1456	Earl of Atholl (5th creation), 1398
John Beaufort; 1401–1444; Duke of Somerset	Thomas Stanley c. 1405–1459; 1st Baron Stanley, King of Mann	Richard Le Strange; 1381–1449; 7th Baron Strange of Knockyn, 3rd Baron Mohun	James Stewart "Black Knight of Lorn"; 1399–c. 1451	Joan Beaufort c. 1404–1445	James I 1394–1437; King of Scots	David Stewart; 1378–1402; Duke of Rothesay, Earl of Atholl, Earl of Carrick
Earldom of Atholl (5th creation) extinct, 1402
Earl of Derby (3rd creation), 1485	Earl of Atholl (8th creation), c. 1457; Lord of Balveny, 1460
Margaret Beaufort; 1443–1509	Thomas Stanley; 1435–1504; 1st Earl of Derby, 2nd Baron Stanley, King of Mann	John Le Strange c. 1440–1477; 8th Baron Strange of Knockyn	John Stewart c. 1437–1442–1512; 1st Earl of Atholl
Henry VII; 1457–1509	George Stanley; 1460–1503; 9th Baron Strange of Knockyn suo uxoris	Joan Le Strange c. 1460–1514; 9th Baroness Strange of Knockyn suo jure	John Stewart c. 1480–c. 1521; 2nd Earl of Atholl
Mary Tudor; 1496–1533	Thomas Stanley; 1504–1521; 2nd Earl of Derby, 10th Baron Strange of Knockyn, 3rd Baron Stanley, King of Mann	John Stewart; 1507–1542; 3rd Earl of Atholl
Eleanor Brandon; 1519–1547	Edward Stanley c. 1509–1572; 3rd Earl of Derby, 11th Baron Strange of Knockyn, 4th Baron Stanley, Lord of Mann	John Stewart "the fair" d. 1579; 4th Earl of Atholl
Earl of Atholl (9th creation), 1596	Lord Murray of Tullibardine, 1604, Earl of Tullibardine (1st creation) and Lord Murray, Gask and Balquhidder, 1606
Margaret Clifford; 1540–1596	Henry Stanley; 1531–1593; 4th Earl of Derby, 12th Baron Strange of Knockyn, 5th Baron Stanley, Lord of Mann	John Stewart; 1566–1603; 1st Earl of Atholl, 6th Lord Innermeath	Marie Ruthven (d. after 1605)	John Stewart; 1563–1595; 5th Earl of Atholl	John Murray (c. 1550 – c. 1609); 1st Earl of Tullibardine, etc.
Earldom of Atholl (8th creation) extinct, 1595
Earl of Tullibardine (2nd creation), 1628
Ferdinando Stanley; 1559–1594; 5th Earl of Derby, 13th Baron Strange of Knockyn, 6th Baron Stanley, Lord of Mann	William Stanley; 1561–1642; 6th Earl of Derby, Lord of Mann	James Stewart d. 1625; 2nd Earl of Atholl	Dorothea Stewart	William Murray c. 1574–1627; 2nd Earl of Tullibardine, etc.	Patrick Murray; 1578–1644; 1st Earl of Tullibardine, etc.
Barony of Strange of Knockyn (9th creation) abeyant, 1594	Earldom of Atholl (9th creation) extinct, 1625	Resigned Earldom of Tullibardine and lordships in favour of his brother, 1626
Elizabeth Stanley; 1588–1633
Baron Strange (4th creation), 1628	Earl of Atholl (10th creation), 1629
Ferdinando Hastings; 1608–1655; 6th Earl of Huntingdon and Baron Hastings	James Stanley; 1607–1651; 7th Earl of Derby, 1st Baron Strange (4th creation)	John Murray c. 1610–1642; 1st Earl of Atholl	James Murray; 1617–1670; 2nd Earl of Tullibardine, etc.
Marquess of Atholl, Viscount of Balquhidder, and Lord Murray, Balveny and Gask, 1676
Charles Stanley; 1628–1672; 8th Earl of Derby, 2nd Baron Strange (4th creation)	Amelia Ann Sophia Stanley; 1633–1702/03	John Murray; 1631–1703; 1st Marquess of Atholl, etc., 2nd Earl of Atholl, 3rd Earl of Tullibardine, etc.
Earl of Tullibardine, Viscount Glenalmond and Lord Murray, 1696 (for life); Duke of Atholl, Marquess of Tullibardine, Earl of Strathtay and Strathardle, Viscount of Balwhidder, Glenalmond and Glenlyon, Lord Murray, Balveny and Gask, 1703	Earl of Dunmore, Viscount of Fincastle, Lord Murray of Blair, Moulin and Tillimet, 1686
Theophilus Hastings; 1650–1701; 7th Earl of Huntingdon and Baron Hastings	William Richard George Stanley c. 1655–1702; 9th Earl of Derby, 3rd Baron Strange (4th creation)	James Stanley; 1664–1736; 10th Earl of Derby, 6th Baron Strange (4th creation)	John Murray; 1660–1724; 1st Duke of Atholl, etc., 2nd Marquess of Atholl, etc., Earl of Tullibardine and Viscount Glenalmond and Lord Murray	Charles Murray; 1661–1710; 1st Earl of Dunmore, etc.
Theophilus Hastings; 1696–1747; 9th Earl of Huntingdon and Baron Hastings	Henrietta Stanley; 1687–1718; 4th Baroness Strange (4th creation)	William Murray; 1689–1746 styled Marquess of Tullibardine	James Murray; 1690–1764; 2nd Duke of Atholl, etc., 7th Baron Strange (4th creation)	George Murray; 1694–1760	John Murray; 1685–1752; 2nd Earl of Dunmore, etc.	William Murray; 1696–1756; 3rd Earl of Dunmore, etc.
Attainted and excluded from succession	Attainted and excluded from succession
Elizabeth Rawdon; 1731–1808; 16th Baroness Botreaux, 15th Baroness Hungerford, 13th Baroness de Moleyns, 13th Baroness Hastings	John Rawdon; 1720–1793; 1st Earl of Moira, 2nd Baron Rawdon, 4th Rawdon Baronet	Henrietta Ashburnham c. 1716–1732; 5th Baroness Strange (4th creation)	Charlotte Murray; 1731–1805; 8th Baroness Strange (4th creation)	John Murray; 1729–1774; 3rd Duke of Atholl	John Murray; 1730–1809; 4th Earl of Dunmore, etc.
Earl Strange and Baron Murray of Stanley, 1786	Baron Dunmore, 1831
Francis Rawdon-Hastings; 1754–1826; 1st Marquess of Hastings, 2nd Earl of Moira, 3rd Baron Rawdon, 5th Rawdon Baronet	Flora Mure-Campbell; 1780–1840; 6th Countess of Loudoun	John Murray; 1755–1830; 4th Duke of Atholl, etc., 1st Earl Strange, etc., 9th Baron Strange (4th creation)	George Murray; 1761–1803	George Murray; 1762–1836; 5th Earl of Dunmore, etc., 1st Baron Dunmore	Alexander Murray; 1764–1842
Baron Glenlyon
George Augustus Francis Rawdon-Hastings; 1808–1844; 2nd Marquess of Hastings; 3rd Earl of Moira; Earl of Rawdon, 4th Baron Rawdon	Barbara Rawdon-Hastings; 1810–1858; 20th Baroness Grey de Ruthyn	Charlotte Murray; 1775–1832 m. Adam Drummond of Megginch	John Murray; 1778–1846; 5th Duke of Atholl, etc., 2nd Earl Strange, etc., 10th Baron Strange (4th creation)	James Murray; 1782–1837; 1st Baron Glenlyon	George Murray; 1784–1860
Edith Maud Rawdon-Hastings; 1833–1874; 10th Countess of Loudoun	John Drummond; 1803–1889	George Augustus Frederick John Murray; 1814–1864; 6th Duke of Atholl, etc., 3rd Earl Strange, etc., 11th Baron Strange (4th creation), 2nd Baron Glenlyon	George Edward Murray; 1818–1854	Alexander Edward Murray; 1804–1845; 6th Earl of Dunmore, etc., 2nd Baron Dunmore	Virginius Murray; 1817–1861
Paulyn Francis Cuthbert Rawdon-Hastings; 1856–1907	Malcolm Drummond; 1856–1924	John James Hugh Henry Stewart-Murray; 1840–1917; 7th Duke of Atholl, etc., 4th Earl Strange, etc., 12th Baron Strange (4th creation), 3rd Baron Glenlyon	George Herbert Murray; 1849–1936	Douglas Stuart Murray; 1853–1920	Charles Adolphus Murray; 1841–1907; 7th Earl of Dunmore, etc., 3rd Baron Dunmore	Reginald Murray; 1846–1925
Baron Stanley abeyance ended, 1921	Baron Strange of Knockyn abeyance ended, 1921
Edith Abney-Hastings; 1883–1960; 12th Countess of Loudoun; Baroness Botreaux, Baroness Hastings, 7th Baroness Stanley	Elizabeth Philipps Abney-Hastings; 1884–1974; 22nd Baroness Hungerford, 20th Baroness de Moleyns, 14th Baroness Strange of Knockyn	John George Stewart-Murray; 1871–1942; 8th Duke of Atholl, etc., 5th Earl Strange, etc., 13th Baron Strange (4th creation), 4th Baron Glenlyon	James Thomas Stewart-Murray; 1879–1957; 9th Duke of Atholl, etc., 6th Earl Strange, etc., 14th Baron Strange (4th creation), 5th Baron Glenlyon	George Evelyn Pemberton Murray; 1880–1947	George Murray; 1884–1940	Alexander Edward Murray; 1871–1962; 8th Earl of Dunmore, etc., 4th Baron Dunmore	Arthur Charles Murray; 1882–1964
Earldom of Strange and Baronies of Murray and Glenlyon extinct and Barony of Strange abeyant, 1957
Baron Strange (4th creation) abeyance terminated, 1965
Jestyn Reginald Austin Plantagenet Philipps; 1917–1991; 2nd Viscount St Davids, 23rd Baron Hungerford, 21st Baron de Moleyns, 15th Baron Strange of Knockyn	John Drummond; 1900–1982; 15th Baron Strange (4th creation)	George Anthony Murray; 1907–1945	Edward David Murray; 1908–1940 styled Viscount Fincastle	Reginald Arthur Murray; 1911–1981; 10th Earl of Dunmore, etc.	Kenneth Randolph Murray; 1913–1995; 11th Earl of Dunmore, etc.
Baron Strange (4th creation) abeyant, 1982–1986
Colwyn Iestyn John Philipps; 1939–2009; 3rd Viscount St Davids, 24th Baron Hungerford, 22nd Baron de Moleyns, 16th Baron Strange of Knockyn	Jean Cherry Drummond; 1928–2008; 16th Baroness Strange (4th creation)	George Iain Murray; 1931–1996; 10th Duke of Atholl, etc.	John Murray; 1929–2012; 11th Duke of Atholl, etc.	John Alexander Murray; 1939–1980; 9th Earl of Dunmore, etc., 5th Baron Dunmore
Barony Dunmore extinct, 1980
Rhodri Colwyn Philipps b. 1966; 4th Viscount St Davids, 25th Baron Hungerford, 23rd Baron de Moleyns, 17th Baron Strange of Knockyn	Roland Augusto Jestyn Estanislao Philipps b. 1970	Adam Humphrey Drummond b. 1953; 17th Baron Strange (4th creation)	Bruce George Ronald Murray b. 1960; 12th Duke of Atholl, etc.	Malcolm Kenneth Murray b. 1946; 12th Earl of Dunmore, etc.	Geoffrey Charles Murray b. 1949
Heir presumptive to the Viscouncy St Davids, Barony Hungerford, Barony de Moleyns, and Barony of Strange of Knockyn	Heir presumptive to the Earldom of Dunmore
John Adam Humphrey Drummond b. 1992	Michael Bruce John Murray b. 1985 styled Marquess of Tullibardine	David Nicholas George Murray b. 1986
Heir apparent to the Barony of Strange (4th creation)	Heir apparent to the Dukedom of Atholl

== See also ==
- Earl of Derby
- Viscount St Davids
- Duke of Atholl
- Baron Strange de Blackmere
