= John Drummond, 15th Baron Strange =

John Drummond
- Born: 6 May 1900; Megginch Castle, Errol, Scotland
- Died: 13 April 1982 (aged 81); Isle of Man
- Occupations: Author, farmer, hereditary peer
- Writing career
- Genres: Fiction, Agriculture, Travel, Drama

John Drummond, 10th of Megginch, 15th Baron Strange (6 May 1900 – 13 April 1982), was Chief of the Baronial House and Branch of Drummond of Concraig and Lennoch within the clan Drummond and Baron of Megginch.

Educated at Eton College, he became a Lieutenant in the Grenadier Guards and Hon. Attaché H.M. Legation Warsaw in 1920. Later, he was elected county councillor for West Perth, Scotland, aged 21. He joined the Black Watch in World War II, but finding himself deskbound, he returned to farm his estate at Megginch. In addition to being an organic soil and fish farmer, he was an author (as John Drummond) of ten books of fact and fiction, inventor, record producer, restaurateur and politician.

== Family life ==
John Drummond was the only son of Captain Malcolm Drummond, JP, DL, and the Hon. Geraldine Margaret Tyssen-Amherst, daughter of Lord Amherst of Hackney and one of seven sisters. He was born, brought up and lived much of his life at Megginch Castle in the Carse of Gowrie, Perthshire, Scotland. He had three sisters – Jean, Victoria Alexandrina and Frances Ada. His middle sister, Victoria Drummond, MBE (who was a goddaughter of Queen Victoria), distinguished herself as the first woman marine engineer in Britain and won the Lloyd's War Medal for bravery.

At the age of 24, on the death of his father, he inherited his ancestral home and estate, Megginch. On 8 February 1928, he married Violet Margaret Florence Jardine, daughter of Sir Robert William Buchanan Jardine, 2nd Baronet (Managing Director of Jardine Matheson), and granddaughter of Sir Robert Jardine, 1st Baronet.

They had three daughters:

- Jean Cherry, 16th Baroness Strange (1928–2005), m. Captain Humphrey Evans (later Drummond of Megginch), MC.
  - Adam Drummond, 17th Baron Strange, the eldest of her six children, inherited her title.
- Heather Mary (1931-2025), m. Lt Cmdr Andrew Christian Currey, RN, whose son is the astrologer Robert Currey.
- Margaret April Irene (b. 1939), m. Sir Quentin Agnew-Somerville, 2nd Baronet, whose daughter is the actress Geraldine Somerville.

== Barony of Strange ==
On the death in 1957 of the 9th Duke of Atholl, who was also 14th Baron Strange, the Barony of Strange fell into abeyance between the representatives of the three daughters of John Murray, 4th Duke of Atholl, Lady Charlotte, Lady Amelia Sophia and Lady Elizabeth. Following his petition to HM The Queen, the abeyance was terminated on 18 December 1964 in favour of John Drummond of Megginch. He was the great-grandson of Lady Charlotte and her second husband, Vice-Admiral Sir Adam Drummond, KCB, of Megginch.

In the House of Lords, he was known as a highly entertaining and controversial speaker–usually attracting a large audience. Sometimes, Hansard would have trouble recording his speeches, which would include movements such as imitating a salmon swimming upstream. His reputation as an eccentric peer lead to media appearances, including as a guest in 1970 on Derek Nimmo's BBC Saturday night chat show, If it’s Saturday, it must be Nimmo.

== Enterprises ==
In the 1920s, he created the Shilling Lightening Feeder chain of inexpensive restaurants in London. Afterwards, he admitted that his first restaurant was a huge success, his second a success, his third broke even but by his seventh, the venture was a disaster.

In the 1930s, he set up Great Scott Records to produce recordings on vinyl discs, and he enlisted various local singers and musicians.

In the 1950s, he made amateur movies and would put on plays at Megginch. Guests would include his friends in show business, such as the stage and film producer, director and writer, Basil Dean, and actors such as Stewart Granger, Laurence Harvey, Hermione Baddeley and Sir John Mills, who made him godfather to his daughter, the actress Hayley Mills.

== Organic farmer ==
Drummond was no less innovative when it came to his theories on agriculture and his farming practices on his Scottish estate. After his death, his daughter, Cherry, spoke in the House of Lords: "I also helped my noble father on his wartime book on agriculture, Charter for the Soil, in which he outlined the future importance of combine harvesting, supermarkets and direct farm marketing. He also advocated farming groups with their own farm slaughterhouse and resident scientist. He was also organic, and farmed with compost. Many of his ideas have been put into practice since 1944 when the book was published."

== Move to the Isle of Man ==
In 1965, he handed over the estate of Megginch to his eldest daughter, Cherry, and went to live in the Isle of Man in the Irish Sea. The Strange title was connected to the Island and the coat of arms included the Manx emblem of three legs. The barony had passed through his ancestors, the Earls of Derby and later the Dukes of Atholl, who up until 1765 had ruled the Isle of Man, originally as Kings of Man and later Lords of Man. He saw himself as a representative of this independent Island, which had no voice at Westminster, and as a courtesy to Manx politics, he sat as a cross-bencher in the House of Lords.

In the Isle of Man, he bought property, farms and river banks with a view to running a fishing lodge based at Tholt-y-Will in Sulby Glen, a remote but enchanting location. He created the first fish hatchery on the Island. However, local fishing regulations made his piscatorial plans impossible, and Tholt-y-Will became a country inn. On many evenings, he could be found entertaining his visitors at the bar.

== Bibliography ==
=== Fact ===
- Charter for the Soil (1943)
- Inheritance of Dreams (1944)
- A Candle in England (1947)

=== Fiction ===
- The Bride wore Black (1942)
- Playing to the Gods (1945)
- Behind Dark Shutters (1949)
- Gold over the Hill (1950)
- The Naughty Mrs Thornton (1952)
- Proof Positive (1956)

=== Drama ===
- The Pocket Show Book (1942)

== Footnotes ==
Peerage of England
Preceded by James Stewart-Murray	Baron Strange; 1965–1982	Succeeded by Cherry Drummond
