= Listed buildings in Knockin =

Knockin is a civil parish in Shropshire, England. It contains 17 listed buildings that are recorded in the National Heritage List for England. Of these, one is at Grade II*, the middle of the three grades, and the others are at Grade II, the lowest grade. The parish contains the villages of Knockin and Osbaston, and the surrounding countryside. The listed buildings include a church, houses, cottages, and farmhouses, a country house, an animal pound, three bridges, and a war memorial.

== Key ==
Grade	Criteria
II*	Particularly important buildings of more than special interest
II	Buildings of national importance and special interest

== Buildings ==
Name and location	Photograph	Date	Notes	Grade
St Mary's Church; 52.79451°N 2.98911°W		1182–1895	The church was restored in 1847 when the south transept and bellcote were added, the organ chamber and vestry were built in 1901, and the porch in 1919. The church is built in sandstone with yellow brick dressings and has a tiled roof with stepped coped verges and crosses on the gable apices. It consists of a nave with a west porch, a south transept, and a chancel with a north organ chamber and vestry. At the west end is a bellcote. The nave, chancel and arcade of the former north aisle are in Norman style.	II*
Rolly Cottage; 52.79999°N 3.00620°W	—	15th century	A farmhouse, later a private house, it was remodelled in the 17th century. The cottage is timber framed with brick infill and cruck construction on a brick plinth, and has a slate roof. There is one storey and an attic, and there are exposed truncated true cruck trusses in the gable ends. On the front is a gabled porch, some windows are fixed, others are casements, and there are gabled eaves dormers.	II
Top Farmhouse; 52.79422°N 2.99414°W		Late 16th century	The farmhouse, later a private house, is timber framed with rendered and painted infill, extensions in brick, and a slate roof. There are two storeys and attics, and a roughly cruciform plan. The gable end facing the road is highly decorated, the upper floor and attic are jettied with carved bressumers, it contains mullioned and transomed windows, and there are bargeboards with finials and pendants. The outer ranges contain casement windows with lattice glazing. In the angle of the left range is a glazed porch, and in the right range is a canted bay window and a shaped gable at the end.	II
Little Heath Farmhouse; 52.79871°N 2.95856°W	—	Early 17th century	The farmhouse was later remodelled, and in the 19th century it was altered and extended. The farmhouse is partly timber framed with brick infill, and partly in limestone and brick painted to resemble timer framing, and has a slate roof. The original range has one storey and an attic, the 19th-century extension has two storeys, and there are two full-height lean-tos. Some windows are fixed, and others are casements.	II
Old House; 52.79419°N 2.99036°W	—	Early 17th century	The house, which has been partly rebuilt, is timber framed with brick infill, applied timber framing to the rebuilt part, and a slate roof. There is one storey and attics and an L-shaped plan, consisting of a hall range with 2 1/2 bays and a two-bay gabled cross-wing, and with a lean-to on the left. On the right is a two-storey gabled porch, its upper storey and the gable jettied. Both gables have decorative bargeboards and finials. The windows are casements.	II
Osbaston Farmhouse; 52.79834°N 3.00709°W	—	Early 17th century (probable)	The farmhouse is in roughcast timber framing with red brick infill on a rendered brick plinth, and it has a slate roof. There is an L-shaped plan, consisting of a 2 1/2 bay hall range, and a two-bay gabled cross-wing at the rear on the left. The windows are sashes and there are gabled eaves dormers. The doorway has a pilastered surround and a bracketed gabled hood.	II
White House; 52.79905°N 3.00676°W	—	Mid to late 17th century	A timber framed cottage with brick infill on a plinth with a slate roof. There are two storeys and attics, and a T-shaped plan consisting of a hall range and a gabled cross-wing. The windows are casements and there are two gabled dormers.	II
Vine Tree House; 52.79421°N 2.99263°W	—	Late 17th or early 18th century	A farmhouse, later a private house, it is in red brick and red sandstone, and has a slate roof. There are two storeys, and an L-shaped plan consisting of a three-bay range, a projecting gabled range on the left, and a single-bay cowhouse on the right. On the front is a flat-roofed trellised porch, and the windows are casements, those in the ground floor and in the gable end with segmental heads.	II
Ivy House Farmhouse; 52.79437°N 2.99361°W	—	Mid to late 18th century	The farmhouse is in red brick with a band, a dentil eaves cornice, and a slate roof. There are two storeys and an attic, three bays, and a rear wing. The doorway has a pilastered surround, and the windows are sashes.	II
Cottage at N.G.R. SJ 3335 2150; 52.78696°N 2.98961°W	—	Late 18th century	The cottage is in sandstone with a slate roof, two storeys and two bays. The windows are casements. The ground floor windows and the doorway have slightly projecting keystones.	II
Knockin Hall, walls and outbuildings 52.79158°N 2.97950°W	—	c. 1790	A small country house in red brick with stone dressings, a moulded eaves cornice, bands, a parapet, and a double-span slate roof. The main block has a double-depth plan, three storeys and an attic and three bays, with a three-storey single-bay range to the right. In the centre of the main range is a porch with six columns, a moulded entablature, and a rectangular fanlight that is flanked by canted bay windows. Most of the windows are sashes, there are some top-hung casements, a window with a pointed head and Gothic tracery, and a French window. The flanking walls are in red brick with a balustrade, the right wall ending in a single storey building with a pyramidal roof. Behind the left wall is another outbuilding in red brick with a dentilled eaves cornice and a pyramidal roof.	II
Knockin Hall Farmhouse; 52.79162°N 2.97975°W	—	c. 1790	The farmhouse is attached to the west side of Knockin Hall. It is in red brick with a dentil eaves cornice, and a slate roof with coped verges. There are two storeys, four bays, and a two-storey lean-to on the left. On the front is a canted bay window, and a porch with a pilastered doorway. Most of the windows are sashes, and there are two casement windows.	II
Former village pound 52.79442°N 2.99424°W	—	Late 18th or early 19th century	The former animal pound is in red sandstone. It has a square plan and an entrance on the south side.	II
Bridge and sheepwash 52.79400°N 2.98695°W	—	c. 1819	The bridge carries the B4396 road over eastern branch of the Weir Brook. It is in red sandstone and consists of a single arch with a keystone. To the south is a wedge shaped enclosure with walls about 1 metre (3 ft 3 in) high, 10 metres (33 ft) long on the road side and 5 metres (16 ft) on the south side. The brook runs through a stone-lined channel, and at the south end is a sluice. There are timber picket gates at the east and west ends of the wall.	II
Bridge and watering place 52.79402°N 2.98903°W	—	Early 19th century	The bridge carries the B4396 road over western branch of the Weir Brook. It is in red sandstone and consists of a single segmental arch. To the south is a semicircular enclosure with walls about 1 metre (3 ft 3 in) high and entrances at both ends to provide access to the brook for cattle.	II
Morton Bridge; 52.80192°N 3.01975°W	—	Early 19th century	The bridge carries the B4396 road over the River Morda. It is in sandstone and consists of a single segmental arch. The bridge has voussoirs, raised keystones, a string course, rectangular end pilasters with pyramidal finials. On the south side is a coped parapet.	II
War memorial 52.79411°N 2.99082°W		1921	The war memorial is a semicircular enclosure with sandstone walls. It is in granite, and consists of a Celtic-type cross on a square shaft, on a plinth with a domed top, and on a square platform. On the front of the cross and the shaft is a carved sword, and on the plinth is a recessed panel with an inscription and the names of those lost in the First World War.	II
