= Adam Drummond, 17th Baron Strange =

English baron

Adam Humphrey Drummond, 17th Baron Strange (born 20 April 1953), is the son of Captain Humphrey ap Evans, MC, who assumed the name 'Drummond of Megginch' by decree of Lord Lyon, 1965, and Cherry Drummond. The 17th Baron Strange has discontinued the use of the suffix 'of Megginch' after his surname.

Drummond was educated at Eton, Sandhurst, and Heriot-Watt University. He was a major in the Grenadier Guards.

Drummond married the Hon. Mary Emma Jeronima Dewar in 1988. She is the daughter of Baron Forteviot. They have one son and one daughter.

He succeeded his mother in 2005, the day after she made a last-minute change to her will leaving everything to her youngest daughter, including Megginch Castle.

Peerage of England
| Preceded by Cherry Drummond | Baron Strange; 2005–present | Incumbent |
