= Osbaston =

Osbaston may refer to the following places:

- Osbaston, Leicestershire, England
- Osbaston, Monmouth, Monmouthshire, Wales
- Osbaston, Oswestry, Shropshire, England
- Osbaston, Telford, Shropshire, England
