= Victoria Drummond =

British marine engineer

Victoria Alexandrina Drummond, MBE
- Drummond after receiving her MBE, July 1941
- Born: 14 October 1894; Errol, Scotland
- Died: 25 December 1978 (aged 84); Burgess Hill, East Sussex, England
- Resting place: Megginch Castle, Scotland; 56.4075°N 3.2301°W
- Occupation: Marine Engineer
- Known for: First woman marine engineer in the UK
- Parents: Capt. Malcolm Drummond, 9th of Megginch; Geraldine Margaret Tyssen-Amherst
- Relatives: Jean Drummond, sister; Frances Ada Drummond, sister; John Drummond, 10th of Megginch, 15th Baron Strange, brother (1900–82)
- Awards: Member of the Order of the British Empire; Lloyd's War Medal for Bravery at Sea

Victoria Alexandrina Drummond, MBE (14 October 1894 – 25 December 1978), was the first woman marine engineer in the UK and the first woman member of Institute of Marine Engineers. In the Second World War she served at sea as an engineering officer in the British Merchant Navy, and received awards for bravery under enemy fire. Her career included service at sea with Blue Funnel Line, Manchester Liners, and Cunard-White Star Line, and ashore at Caledon Shipbuilding & Engineering Company in Dundee.

During her engineering career, Drummond encountered both acceptance and prejudice because she was a woman. In 1926 she qualified as a second engineer, but no-one would sign her on as such, so she took work as a fifth engineer. From 1929 onwards she repeatedly sat the Board of Trade examination for promotion to chief engineer, but the BoT examiners repeatedly failed her, solely because she was a woman.

In the global shipping slump in the years after the Wall Street crash of 1929, Drummond found no work at sea for at least 11 years. Even after the UK entered the Second World War in 1939, no shipping company would employ her until 1940. She finally circumvented Board of Trade prejudice by passing the chief engineer examination of Panama, a flag of convenience. And even after that, in 1942 she again had to accept a position as fifth engineer.

In 1946 and again in 1952, Drummond served as a supervising engineer on behalf of two shipping companies, overseeing the building of new ships. From 1959 onwards she found work only on run-down tramp ships registered under flags of convenience, mostly Hong Kong. She retired in 1962, and died in 1978.

== Childhood ==
Victoria Drummond was born on 14 October 1894 at Errol, Perthshire, Scotland. Her father was Captain Malcolm Drummond of Megginch, Groom in Waiting to Queen Victoria and Deputy Lieutenant of Perthshire. Her mother, Geraldine Margaret Tyssen-Amherst was the daughter of William Tyssen-Amherst, 1st Baron Amherst of Hackney.

She had two sisters, Jean and Frances, and a younger brother, John Drummond, 15th Baron Strange. She was named Victoria for Queen Victoria, who was one of her godmothers. Drummond and her siblings were brought up in both the Church of Scotland and the Scottish Episcopal Church. All four worked as children: growing vegetables and flowers to sell and keeping poultry. Drummond's speciality was hand-churning butter. Their privileged upbringing was straitened after her maternal grandparents lost a fortune in investments in 1906.

One of Drummond's grandmothers turned wood and ivory and belonged to the Worshipful Company of Turners. Drummond herself became a prizewinning model maker, making her own toys that were shown in exhibitions and won prizes in competitions.

Drummond used to visit the engineering works of Robert Morton and Sons in Errol, which built steam-powered and petrol-engined lorries and buses. As a young girl she asked Mr Morton how she could learn to be a marine engineer and go to sea. Morton may or may not have taken the young girl seriously, but he told her to serve an apprenticeship, find a shop with a vacancy and start at the beginning, serve her time and then find a ship that would give her a berth as an engineer.

In February 1913, she was presented at court to King George V and Queen Mary as a debutante.

== Apprenticeship ==
In 1915, Drummond turned 21, and her father encouraged her to choose her own career. She repeated her ambition to be a marine engineer. From 18 October 1916, she was apprenticed at the Northern Garage, South Street, Perth. Her wage as a first year apprentice was three shillings a week, from which sixpence was deducted for National Insurance so her net wage was half a crown. In her second year her wage before National Insurance was six shillings. Her foreman, a Mr Malcolm, who had worked in Clyde shipyards, gone to sea and risen to be a chief engineer at sea, supported her training. On three evenings a week a teacher from Dundee Technical College (now Abertay University) taught her maths and engineering.

Mr Malcolm supported Drummond's training, but in 1918 the garage dismissed him for drunkenness. Drummond took this as the right time to move on and resigned from the garage. Her father arranged her an introduction to the Caledon Shipbuilding & Engineering Company in Dundee, which took her on in its engine and boiler works at Lilybank in Dundee. She started as a pattern maker for metal casting, and in 1919 was promoted to the finishing shop. She joined the Women's Engineering Society and completed her apprenticeship in 1920 after which she was elected a graduate of the Institute of Marine Engineers. She stayed on at Caledon as a journeyman, later transferring to the drawing office. In 1922, Caledon suffered a decline in orders and laid off many workers, including Drummond who left on 7 July.

== Early years at sea ==
=== Anchises ===
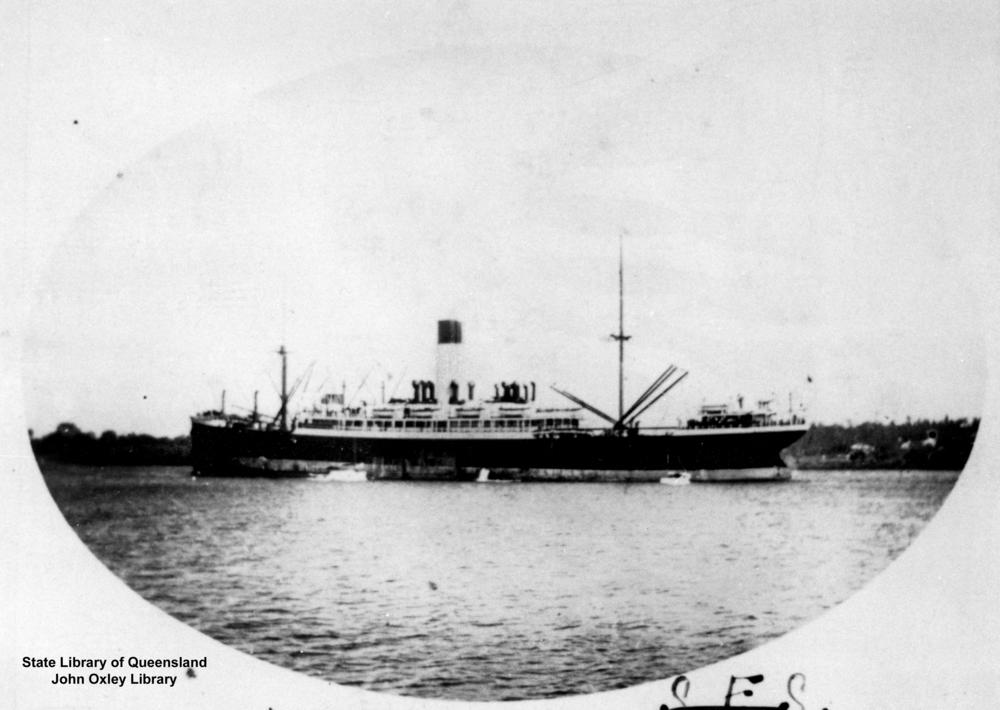
Blue Funnel's Anchises, on which Drummond was 10th Engineer 1922–24

Early in Drummond's time at Caledon, the founder W.B. Thompson introduced her and her parents to Henry Wortley, a director of Blue Funnel Line. Wortley offered Drummond the promise of a position as an engineer at sea when she completed her apprenticeship. When Caledon gave her notice in 1922, Drummond wrote to Wortley to take up his offer. Unknown to Drummond, Wortley had died in 1919. However, Lawrence Holt honoured Wortley's promise and invited her to Liverpool for an interview.

Blue Funnel employed Drummond initially in its engineering record office in Liverpool on a salary of £12 a month. About a month later, on 25 August, she was instructed to sign on the 10,000 GRT passenger liner Anchises for a trial trip from Liverpool to Glasgow as an Assistant Engineer. On 2 September, she signed on Anchises again as Tenth Engineer. The salary of £10 a month was £2 less than the company had paid her ashore. A Christmas card sent by Drummond to the Women's Engineering Society from the Anchises in 1922 survives in the WES archives. She served on the ship until 1924, making four voyages to Australia and one to China.

On Anchises all the crew, all but one of the officers and most of the passengers accepted having a woman engineer. A few of the women passengers passed demeaning remarks at her. When Anchises' usual Second Engineer was taken ill his position was covered by an extra Second, Mr Howard, who Drummond says "persecuted" her. Drummond was friends with the usual Second Engineer, Malcolm Quayle, who supported her career, was her escort for social events ashore and whom she called her "protector". The pair had prickly tempers, for which Drummond nicknamed Quayle "hedgehog" and he nicknamed her "Kate", after Katherina in William Shakespeare's The Taming of the Shrew. Quayle was married and had two children, and Drummond was emphatic that there was never any impropriety between them. However, when in 1924 she wanted to take her exams to become a Second Engineer, she unwisely wrote to her manager at Blue Funnel, Mr Freeman, suggesting that Quayle be promoted to Chief Engineer and she could be his Second. This gave Freeman the damaging impression that Quayle and Drummond were having an affair. Drummond left Anchises and Blue Funnel in April 1924.

=== Mulbera ===
Drummond began to study for her Second Engineer's qualification and, in October 1926, she obtained her Second Engineer's Certificate becoming Britain's first certificated woman marine engineer. However, after qualifying, she was able to find work only as a Fifth Engineer, signing on the British-India Steam Navigation Company 9,100 GRT steam turbine liner Mulbera on 14 April 1927. She served on the ship until 4 December 1928, completing one voyage to East Africa and four to India and Ceylon.

Aboard Mulbera Drummond was again accepted by nearly all the ship's company. The exception was the Second Engineer, Mr Lamb, who on Drummond's first day aboard told her that he didn't want her there. Drummond said Lamb often shouted at her, occasionally swore at her and thus wore her down. Drummond privately nicknamed Lamb the Tiger Cat or just "The Tiger". On occasion she also encountered passengers who initially did not believe a woman could be a marine engineer. Drummond won them round by competently doing her job.

In port in Aden on 11 May 1928, Drummond received an air mail letter telling her that aboard her former ship Anchises on 13 April her friend Malcolm Quayle had died. The letter gave no details of what had happened and she found out none until some time thereafter.

== 12 years ashore ==
From about 1919, Drummond's sister Jean ran the Queen Victoria Girl's Club at 122 Kennington Road, Lambeth, south London: a job that included a flat at the top of the building. From 1929 Victoria and Frances leased a house almost opposite at 143 Kennington Road, which they named The Studio. Frances worked as a commercial artist and she and Victoria also developed a business, the Golden Fisheries, trading goldfish that they kept in their garden pond and in tanks in the house.

From October 1929, Drummond repeatedly sat the Board of Trade examination for Chief Engineer, but every time the examiners failed her. Mr Martin at Dundee continued to support her and eventually in 1936, tackled the examiners, who privately admitted to him that they always failed her because she was a woman. Indeed, to prevent any accusations of unfairness, the Board of Trade Examiners habitually failed all candidates who sat the examinations with her.

From 1935, Frances and Victoria's business took them abroad to trade fairs in Leipzig, Prague and Vienna. In March 1938 when German forces occupied Austria in the Anschluss, the two sisters were at a trade fair in Vienna. Drummond photographed Hitler in his motorcade and later described that time in Vienna as very tense, chaotic and dangerous.

=== Refugee children ===
In response to their experience, the Drummond sisters helped several Austrian children to enter the UK as refugees, and sponsored them by finding schools, accommodation and paying their expenses for a year.

== World War II service ==
In 1939, war seemed to grow inevitable so Drummond applied to return to sea as a Second Engineer. Despite her good service on liners of two of the most prestigious companies in the Merchant Navy, and glowing references from numerous superior officers, all her many applications were declined. Therefore, on the eve of World War II she joined Jean and Frances enlisting as Air raid wardens in Lambeth, London.

=== Har Zion ===
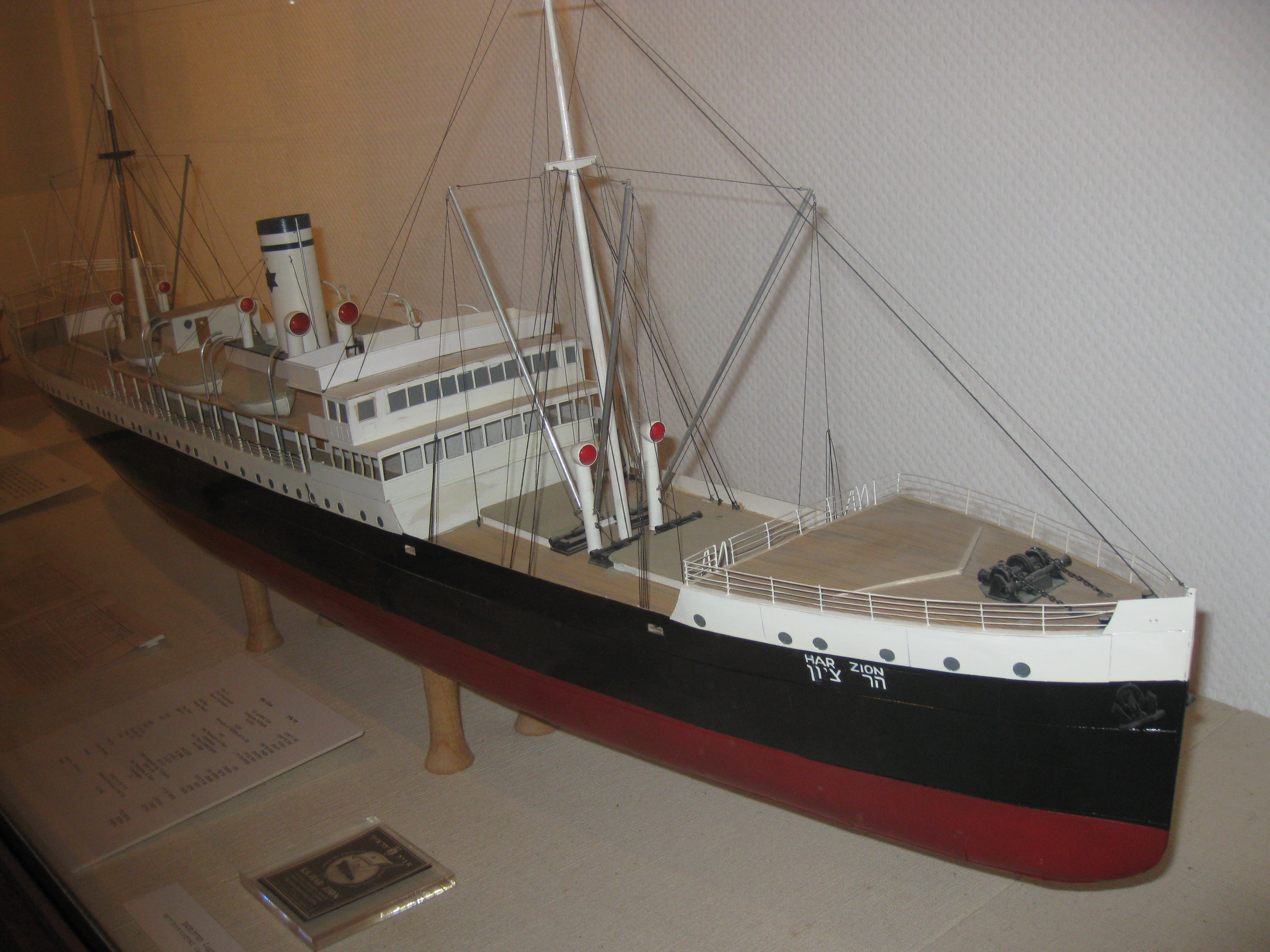
Model of Har Zion in the Israeli National Maritime Museum

Drummond then tried visiting the Royal Docks in the hope of finding a ship that would take her on. Eventually on such a visit a donkeyman, (Note: A donkeyman was a crewman who operated and maintained machinery other than the ship's main engines. His exact responsibilities varied widely between different ships.) who had served with her on Mulbera 12 years earlier, recognised Drummond in a café. He and his shipmates advised her that if no British company would take her she should try for a berth on a foreign ship. They introduced her to a representative of Palestine Maritime Lloyd, owned by a group of Jewish businessmen based in Haifa, Palestine. He was sceptical of signing a woman engineer until he saw her papers. Palestine Maritime Lloyd operated mostly coasters of 200 to 300 GRT, but had also one small deep-sea cargo and passenger ship, the 2,508 GRT Har Zion (Mount Zion), that which could carry both cargo and 110 passengers. Har Zion needed a new Second Engineer so he immediately offered Drummond a berth at a salary of £41 10s.

Har Zion was registered at Famagusta in the British Protectorate of Cyprus. Her officers and crew were a mixture of Arab, Czech, Egyptian, German, Hungarian, Russian, and Spanish, and the ship's dog was Polish. She was built in 1907 and by 1940 was in poor condition. Drummond mastered disciplinary problems among the engine room crew and then in drydock in Antwerp completed enough furnace and boiler repairs for Har Zion to pass its Lloyd's Certificate inspection.

In Antwerp, Har Zion took on a Greek Third Engineer who clashed with Drummond. The ship worked to Beirut, Haifa and back, and on its return trip evacuated the British Consul and part of the British Expeditionary Force from Marseille to Gibraltar. When the ship returned to London in July 1940 Drummond left to get away from the Third Engineer. About a month later, in August 1940, Har Zion was sunk in the Western Approaches by the German submarine U-38, with the loss of 36 of the 37 people aboard.

=== Bonita ===
In August 1940 a Panamanian company, Compañía Arena Limitada, gave Drummond a berth on its 4,929 GRT cargo ship Bonita at a salary of £46 10s – £5 a month more than on Har Zion. Drummond joined her at Fowey in Cornwall where the ship loaded china clay for the USA. Being a neutral ship she was not offered the protection of a place in a convoy.

On the morning of Sunday 25 August 1940, Bonita was in the North Atlantic about 400 miles (640 km) from land when Luftwaffe Focke-Wulf Fw 200 Condor aircraft attacked. Drummond was on watch and immediately ordered the fireman and greaser to join her on the starting platform ready in case they needed to escape. Near misses from 250 kg (550 lb) bombs blew all the lagging off the pipes in the engine room and split the main water service pipe feeding the boilers. Fuel oil started leaking from somewhere, hitting Drummond in the face and closing one of her eyes. She ordered her fireman and greaser to open the fuel injectors and main steam throttle to increase speed and then get out of the engine room in case they needed to abandon ship.

Drummond remained alone at her post. Bonita had never before exceeded 9 knots (17 km/h) but in 10 minutes Drummond somehow increased speed to 12.5 knots (23 km/h). The Master, a Captain Herz from Hungary, used the extra speed to change course sharply and avoid being hit whenever a Condor bombed the ship. The bombs were heavy enough to lift Bonita in the water and cause damage even by near misses. The ship was hit by both 13 mm (0.51 in) and 20 mm (0.79 in) machine-gun fire. Drummond says 25 bombs were dropped; this suggests that six or seven aircraft took part in the attack, which continued for 30–35 minutes. Bonita continued her crossing without further incident and reached Norfolk, Virginia on 8 September. There Drummond received news that The Studio at 143 Kennington Road had been bombed but Frances and Jean were safe.

She is about the most courageous woman I ever saw. She seems to be without fear or nerves, is very good at her job and has an uncanny power over engines, for which I once thanked God.

Aboard Bonita Drummond formed a close friendship with another married man, the First Mate Mr Warner. In a published account of her conduct in the air raid, Warner described Drummond as "about the most courageous woman I ever saw". Newspapers in Norfolk, VA quoted Captain Herz commending Drummond as "one of the most competent engineers ever employed on this vessel".

In Norfolk, Drummond made friends with a Virginian woman, Mrs Julia Davies, who was engaged in charitable work collecting goods to send to Britain that were in short supply because of the War. Davies engaged Drummond as a speaker at charitable events, and in return directed to Lambeth much of the goods that her charitable network was collecting.

At Norfolk Bonita discharged her china clay and loaded scrap iron. The ship made her return crossing via Halifax, Nova Scotia, where she joined an eastbound convoy. The oil-burning ship was unable to stop making black smoke, which made her dangerously conspicuous. When the third or fourth engineer were on watch the ship lost speed and fell behind the convoy. Whenever Drummond was on watch the ship managed to increase speed and regain her station.

=== Developments ashore ===
By Christmas 1941 Drummond's sisters Jean and Frances were preparing to move into a flat in Restormel House, Chester Way, Kennington.

By 1941, Drummond had qualified as a Panamanian chief engineer. These examinations were a purely written paper, with the gender or status of the candidate not being known to the examiners. By then the Board of Trade had failed her for Chief Engineer 31 times. Due to the needs of war the Board of Trade was now granting Chief Engineer certificates to experienced Second Engineers on the sole basis of an oral examination. However, when Drummond requested this dispensation the Board refused. Because of the dangers of war, the Board patronisingly suggested that Drummond take a shore job as an instructor. Drummond replied firmly that numerous Chief and other engineers with whom she had served had lacked the nerve to cope while under enemy attack, and therefore the best service she could give was as a chief engineer at sea.

In about April 1941, Drummond learnt that Mrs Davies in Virginia had raised £400 toward the provision of a "Victoria A. Drummond Ambulance" for the people of Lambeth. In raising funds Davies and a Mrs Leitch had even enlisted the poet Robert Frost to give a public reading of his works. However, what Lambeth needed more was a British Restaurant for people who had been bombed out of their homes. Accordingly, the "Victoria A. Drummond Canteen" was opened in Westminster Bridge Road near Lambeth North tube station. The canteen served hot meals for sixpence a head and remained open for the remainder of the war.

For her courage aboard Bonita, Drummond was awarded the MBE and the Lloyd's War Medal for Bravery at Sea in July 1941. Her MBE was presented by George VI.

=== Czikos ===
In February 1941, Warner and Drummond signed on as captain and second engineer of an old Panamanian steamship, Czikos. The ship was in Lisbon so a skeleton crew including Warner and Drummond sailed out to join her on Yeoward Brothers' passenger liner Avoceta. They sailed Czikos to Gibraltar, where they joined a convoy bound for the Firth of Clyde. About 300 miles (480 km) northwest of Ireland a Luftwaffe Fw 200 Condor attacked Czikos. As with Bonita, none of the bombs hit but the near misses damaged the ship. The Condor also machine-gunned the ship, killing a quartermaster at the helm and wounding two other crewmen.

=== Manchester Port ===
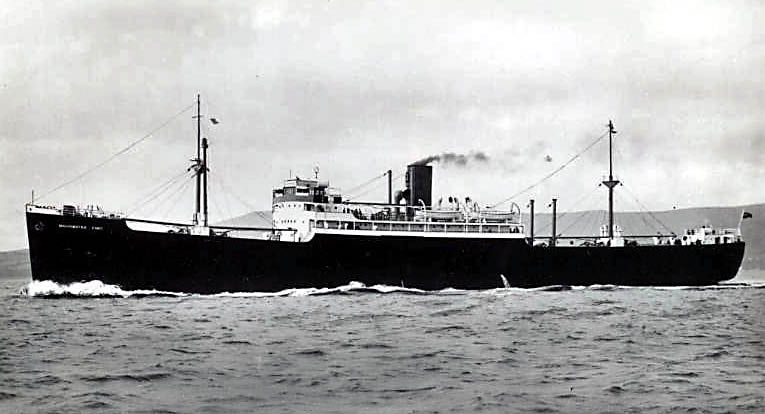
Manchester Liners' Manchester Port, on which Drummond was Fifth Engineer in 1942

In April 1942, Drummond joined Manchester Liners' 7,071 GRT Manchester Port in Liverpool as Fifth Engineer. The ship was unkempt and filthy, including the galley, the food was ill-served and the Master, Captain Davis, seemed permanently drunk. Nevertheless, Manchester Port was made Commodore Ship for convoy ON 89 to North America. The ship survived the crossing and on 17 May loaded dynamite at Trois-Rivières, Quebec. On 20 May the ship reached Halifax to join an eastbound convoy. Drummond reported Davis for drunkenness and on 21 May he was removed under police escort, replaced by a Captain Middleton. Manchester Port joined convoy HX 191, which left Halifax on 24 May and reached Liverpool on 6 June. The ship discharged her explosive cargo in Manchester and Drummond returned to her sisters in Lambeth.

=== Danae II ===
At the end of August 1942, Drummond and Warner joined the 2,660 GRT cargo steamer Danae II at Boston, Lincolnshire as First Mate and Second Engineer. The ship was owned by the Ministry of War Transport and managed by Ambrose, Davies and Matthews, who had chosen someone else for Second Engineer. The Third and Fourth Engineers were unqualified. The Master, Captain Cheek, the Chief Engineer and either the third or fourth engineer were all heavy drinkers. Drummond called Danae II "The worst ship I ever sailed in".

The ship steamed north via North Shields in Northumberland to Methil Docks in Fife. There Cheek tried to give Drummond her notice on medical grounds, but a doctor ashore stopped him. When the ship reached Aultbea in Ross, Cheek sacked Drummond with 24 hours' notice, although she had signed on for two years. The firemen, greasers and donkeyman all refused to sail without Drummond, and so did the deck crew. Her friend Warner, however, refused to leave the ship, leaving Drummond feeling betrayed.

Drummond reported the mismanagement of Danae II to the MoWT and Ambrose, Davies and Matthews. Cheek's solicitors threatened to sue Drummond for defamation, but no action followed.

=== Perseus ===
At the end of January 1943, Drummond returned to Blue Funnel, signing on as refrigeration engineer on the 10,286 GRT refrigerated cargo ship Perseus. Again Drummond was beset by a hostile Second Engineer always being rude to her, giving her extra work and trying to prevent her from getting shore leave.

Perseus circumnavigated the World westbound from Liverpool via New York, Cuba, the Panama Canal, Australia, South Africa, Sierra Leone and Gibraltar, returning to Liverpool in September 1943. In July 1943 the ship visited Cape Town, where Drummond was able to go ashore and visit her friend Malcolm Quayle's grave outside the city.

After an eight-month voyage Drummond did not want to return to sea immediately. After leaving Perseus in September 1943, she returned to her sisters in Lambeth, where Restormel House had been damaged by a bomb but their flat remained intact. Drummond did not seek another position at sea until January 1944.

=== Karabagh ===
In April 1944, Drummond signed on as Assistant Engineer of a diesel ship, the Baltic Trading Company's 6,427 GRT oil tanker Karabagh, with which she sailed on an Arctic convoy to Onega in the USSR. On return to England in May 1944, Drummond signed onto Karabagh again as Fourth Engineer. After D-Day on 6 June 1944, the tanker spent three months shuttling supplies such as aviation spirit across the English Channel for the Invasion of Normandy, initially from the Solent and later from Newport, Wales.

Drummond formed a friendship with Karabagh's Master, a man from Northern Ireland called Captain Charlton. In Newport the two took occasional trips ashore, and once on a visit to Tintern Abbey he proposed to her. She did not accept, and later explained that this was because both he and she had short tempers.

== Post-war years ==
After the War the bomb-damaged Restormel House was demolished. In December 1945 and January 1946, Drummond's sisters Jean and Frances moved into 160 Kennington Road, which they named Tresco.

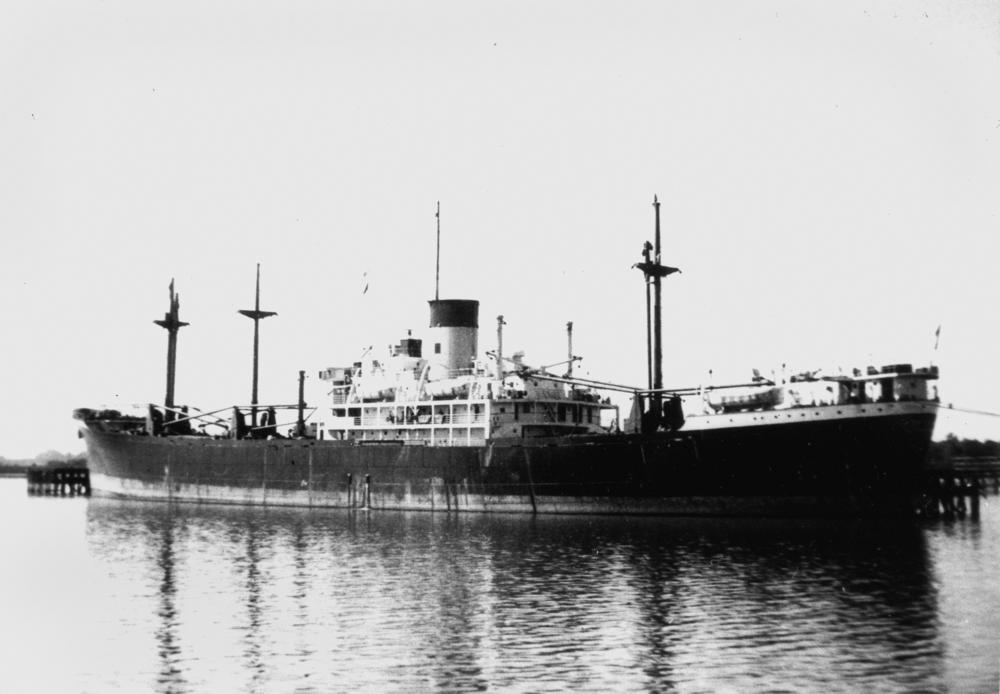
Rhexenor, one of two Blue Funnel ships whose completion Drummond supervised at Caledon's yard in Dundee

In April 1946, Blue Funnel appointed Drummond to return to Caledon in Dundee to supervise the completion of the 10,200 GRT sister ships Rhexenor and Stentor, which she did until July.

Karabagh had given Drummond enough experience to take her Second Engineer's motor examination. She passed in May 1946 on her second attempt. In September, Drummond returned to sea as Second Engineer, now with Cunard-White Star Line. She worked as a relief Second Engineer, serving for short periods on Cunard cargo ships until January 1947. After leaving Cunard she served on the MoWT's 5,028 GRT Type C1 ship Hickory Mount for five months, signing on in May 1947 at Fowey in Cornwall, leaving in September in Philadelphia and returning to Britain as a passenger on Cunard's RMS Aquitania.

For the next four years Drummond worked as Chief or Second Engineer for short periods for various shipping companies. They included Elsie Beth, which she joined at Barry, South Wales in August 1949 and left in Dublin in December. The voyage took Drummond back to Onega in the USSR, where she had previously been in 1944 on Karabagh.

In February 1952, Drummond returned to supervising shipbuilding in Scotland. The Phocian Ship Agency sent her to the Burntisland Shipbuilding Company in Fife to oversee building of the 8,453 GRT Master Nicos until the ship was launched in September. Drummond would have liked further jobs supervising shipbuilding, but instead Phocian offered her a berth on the 10,000 GRT Markab. She spent a month on Markab as Second Engineer in October and November 1952, then returned to the ship as chief engineer in January 1953. This turned out to be a year-long voyage that included the Suez Canal, Japan, Hong Kong, Singapore, the Mediterranean, the Black Sea, the US, the Caribbean, Argentina, Brazil, Cape Verde and ended in Antwerp in January 1954.

Drummond next spent another three years serving for short periods for various shipping companies. Then in April 1957 in London, she signed on Monarch Steamship Company's 5,806 GRT British Monarch. This turned out to be a six-month voyage: across the Atlantic to the US, through the Panama Canal, across the Pacific to Japan, south to Fiji, north to British Columbia and back through the Panama Canal, back across the Atlantic and ending in Liverpool in November 1957.

Drummond returned home to Kennington Road until May 1958, when she began a two-month voyage as the engineer of an old motor yacht, My Adventuress, from Southampton to Istanbul. The engine was unreliable and Drummond's relationship with the owner and his family was strained. Thereafter she stayed ashore in Kennington for another year.

== Jebshun Shipping Company ==
=== Grelrosa / Shantae ===
Drummond spent her final three years at sea as a chief engineer with the Jebshun Shipping Company of Hong Kong. Her first Jebshun ship was the 7,085 GRT former Empire ship Grelrosa, which Drummond joined in Garston, Merseyside, Liverpool in July 1959. The ship had been laid up for 18 months and needed extensive work to pass its Lloyd's inspection. Grelrosa steamed via the Suez Canal and Singapore to Japan, China and Hong Kong, where Jebshun renamed her Shantae.

As Shantae in 1960, the ship sailed to Malaysia and Thailand. In February 1960 in Bangkok Port the ship loaded a flammable mixed cargo of rice, firewood, paper, cotton, palm husks, charcoal, flour and palm oil, all carelessly and chaotically packed into the holds. On top of this, 580 head of live buffalo were crammed on as deck cargo. En route to Hong Kong on 1 March the cargo in number 2 hold caught fire. Drummond provided steam to smother and contain the fire, but this depleted the ship's water supply which was needed to make steam to power the main engine. Shantae reached Hong Kong on 3 March, where the port's fire service used carbon dioxide gas to extinguish the fire. The ship returned to sea 11 days later, trading to Chinese ports including Tsingtao. Drummond signed off at Hong Kong in mid-April.

=== Shun Fung ===
Drummond's next Jebshun vessel was the 7,148 GRT Park ship Shun Fung, which she joined in Kristiansand, Norway in September 1960. This was another steamship that had been laid up and needed work to make her reliable. Drummond served on her for 14 months, sailing via the Suez Canal to Japan and China, then via Durban to West Africa, back to Hong Kong, then to India, and back via Singapore and Chinese ports to Hong Kong, where she signed off in November 1961.

=== Santa Granda ===
Drummond's final Jebshun ship, and the final vessel of her career, was the 7,284 GRT Liberty ship Santa Granda. Only 10 days after signing off Shun Fung in Hong Kong she signed on Santa Granda for six months. She found Santa Granda to be in very poor condition: rusty, dirty and in poor repair. The governor, a vital piece of safety equipment, was missing from the engine.

Santa Granda worked to Shanghai and then Basuo on Hainan Island, where it loaded iron ore in December 1961. The ship left port on 8 December, and by midnight was struggling against a strong headwind. The next day water was found in the Number one hold bilge, which took an hour and a half to pump out. On 11 December the Number one hold bilge again needed pumping out, which took an hour and three-quarters. From 12 December the Number one hold bilge needed pumping continuously.

Finally on 13 December the Master and Drummond inspected the Number One hold. They found about 10 frames adrift, a plate near the bulkhead split either side of the frame, and frames corroded through at the bottom and broken across. With the motion of the ship, plates and frames were moving past each other and friction was heating the metal. If a plate failed and flooded Number One hold, the Number One bulkhead would be likely to fail. In that case, and laden with dense iron ore, Santa Granda would be likely to sink within a very few minutes.

Santa Granda initially made for Shanghai, until the Number One Hold's bulkhead began to buckle. Then the Master put the ship about for Whampoa on the Pearl River Delta, arriving on 17 December. After the iron ore was unloaded, ship surveyors allowed the damaged Santa Granda to leave to make for Hong Kong for repairs. Christmas was spent in Hong Kong, with Drummond arguing against Jebshun representatives who wanted to postpone many of the repairs essential to make the ship safe. Drummond began engine and boiler repairs, and on 29 December the ship moved to drydock in Kowloon.

A fortnight later Santa Granda returned to sea, continuing to take cargoes of iron ore from Basuo to other Chinese ports. On 25 March 1962 Drummond advised that the ship was still in too poor a condition to pass its forthcoming Lloyd's inspection. Two days later, Santa Granda reached Hong Kong, where Jebshun told the Master they would transfer the insurance from Lloyd's to a French company. Drummond believed this was to avoid inspection, and on 30 March, she gave the Master her notice that she would quit the ship the next day. Then Drummond spent 10 days in Hong Kong and visited friends in Japan before returning to London and retirement.

== Retirement ==
Drummond and her two sisters spent the next 12 years living at 160 Kennington Road. She attended annual meetings of the Institute of Marine Engineers (now IMarEST) and wrote her life story. In the early 1970s Drummond grew less mobile and more dependent on Jean and Frances. In 1974 she fell out of bed, broke her leg and was admitted to St Thomas' Hospital. Soon Jean and Frances were admitted to the same hospital, where they died within two days of each other. Drummond recovered physically but her state of mind deteriorated and she was discharged to St George's Retreat, a church-run nursing home in Burgess Hill in East Sussex. She died there on Christmas Day 1978, and is buried at Megginch Castle beside her parents and sisters.

In a career spanning 40 years, Drummond made 49 ocean-going voyages. She persevered with her career through hardship and some discrimination, doing the hard physical work of the engine room, managing the engine room crew and at times enduring prejudice and discrimination from some of her immediate superiors. However, she won acceptance and support from most of her fellow-officers and near-universal support and loyalty from crewmen.

== Commemoration ==
She is commemorated by a Victoria Drummond Room at the IMarEST headquarters in London.

Her biography, The Remarkable Life of Victoria Drummond – Marine Engineer, was written by her niece, Cherry Drummond, 16th Baroness Strange.

In 2013, Drummond was featured in an exhibition 'Women in Science' at the National Library of Scotland, which showcased the legacy of notable Scottish women scientists. Abertay University has a blue plaque on its Old College building, commemorating her training there to be an engineer when it was Dundee Institute of Technology. The plaque features on the Dundee Women's Trail and Dundee Global Trail.

In 2018, Drummond was inducted into the Scottish Engineering Hall of Fame and the Royal Navy renamed a lecture theatre used to train marine and air engineers at HMS Sultan in Gosport the Drummond Theatre.

== Sources ==
- Drummond, Cherry (1994). The Remarkable Life of Victoria Drummond – Marine Engineer. London: Institute of Marine Engineers. ISBN 0-907206-54-9.
