= SS Har Zion =

Steamship built in Denmark in 1907 and sunk by a U-boat in 1940

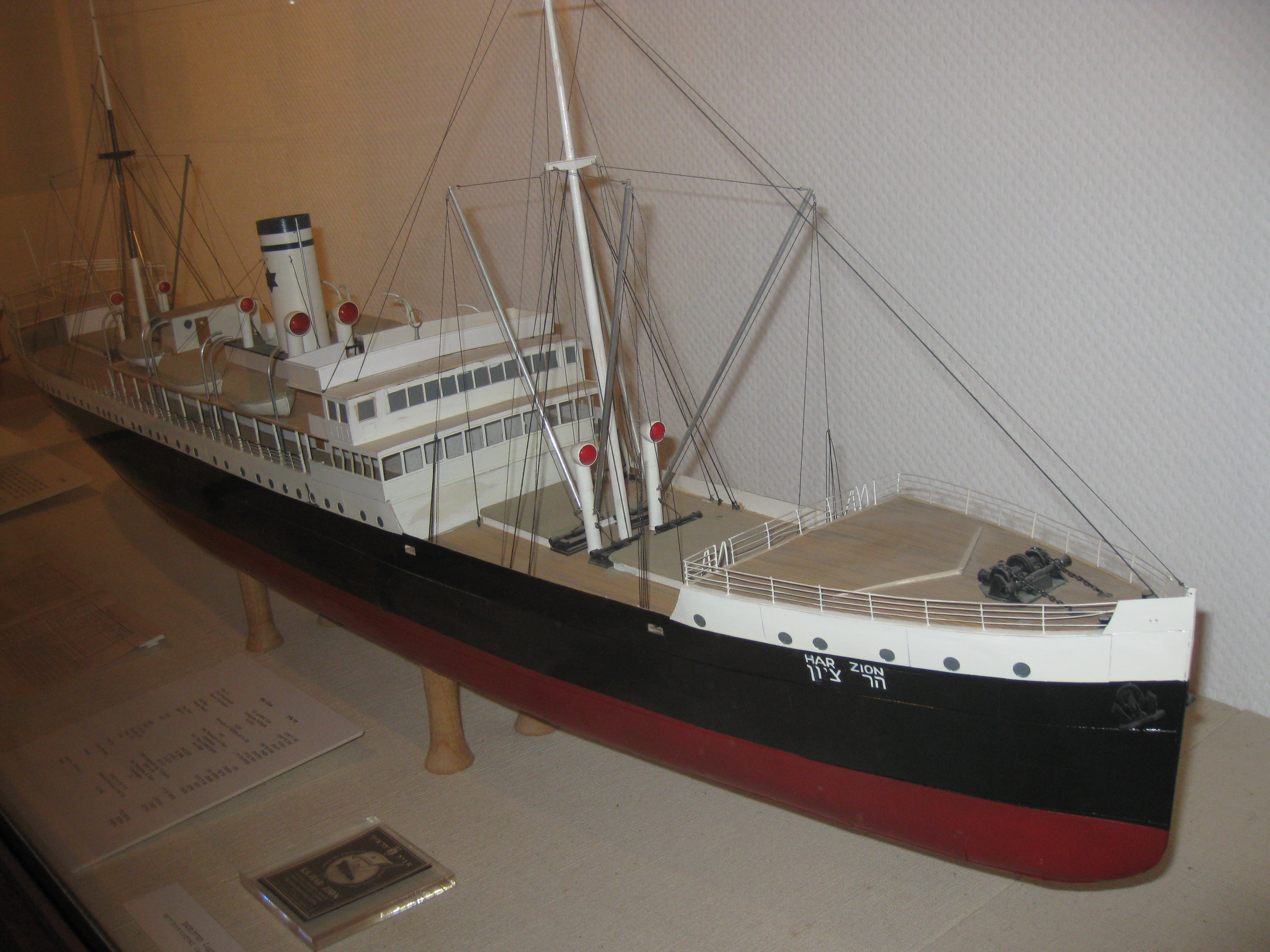
- Model of Har Zion in the Israeli National Maritime Museum

History
- Name: 1907: St. Jan; 1913: Nickerie; 1933: Risveglio; 1935: Har Zion
- Namesake: 1907: Sankt Jan; 1913: Nickerie River; 1933: "Awakening"; 1935: Mount Zion
- Owner: 1907: Østasiatiske Kompagni; 1913: Koninklijke Nederlandse SM; 1918: US Shipping Board; 1919: Koninklijke Nederlandse SM; 1933: Ignazio Messina & Co; 1935: Palestine Maritime Lloyd
- Operator: 1918: Emergency Fleet Corp; 1919: Kon West-Indische Mij; 1927: Koninklijke Nederlandse SM
- Port of registry: 1907: (Denmark) Copenhagen; 1913: (Netherlands) Amsterdam; 1918: (United States); 1919: (Netherlands) Amsterdam; 1933: (Kingdom of Italy) Genoa; 1935: (United Kingdom) Famagusta
- Builder: Burmeister & Wain, Copenhagen
- Yard number: 256
- Launched: 1907
- Completed: June 1907
- Identification: 1907: code letters NQHR; 1913: code letters PMRF; 1918: call sign PER; 1933: code letters PEOB; 1935: UK official number 114941; 1935: call sign VQSF
- Fate: Sunk by torpedo in 1940

General characteristics
- Type: passenger and cargo ship
- Tonnage: 2,478 GRT, 1,597 NRT, 3,285 DWT
- Length: 326.0 ft (99.36 m) overall; 310.8 ft (94.7 m) registered
- Beam: 40.7 ft (12.4 m)
- Depth: 18.8 ft (5.7 m)
- Decks: 2
- Installed power: 281 NHP, 1,450 ihp
- Propulsion: 1 × screw; 1 × triple expansion engine
- Speed: 11 knots (20 km/h)
- Capacity: passengers: 53 × 1st class, 186 × deck; cargo: 147,000 cu ft (4,200 m^{3}) grain; 140,000 cu ft (4,000 m^{3}) bale
- Sensors & processing systems: by 1930: wireless direction finding
- Armament: in wartime: DEMS
- Notes: sister ships: St. Thomas, St. Croix

SS Har Zion (Hebrew: הַר צִיּוֹן, lit. 'Mount Zion') was a passenger and cargo steamship that was built in Denmark in 1907 as St. Jan for Det Østasiatiske Kompagni. In 1913 Koninklijke Nederlandse Stoomboot-Maatschappij bought her and renamed her Nickerie. In 1933 Ignazio Messina & Co bought her and renamed her Risveglio. In 1935 Palestine Maritime Lloyd bought her and renamed her Har Zion.

In 1918 the First World War the United States seized Nickerie under angary. In 1940 in the Second World War a U-boat sank Har Zion by torpedo in the North Atlantic, killing 36 of her 37 crew.

== St. Jan and her sisters ==
In 1907 Burmeister & Wain in Copenhagen, Denmark built three sister ships for Det Østasiatiske Kompagni (ØK, "The East Asiatic Company"). Yard number 256 was completed in June as St. Jan. Yard number 257 was completed in July as St. Thomas. St. Croix was completed in August. The ships were named after the three main islands in the Danish West Indies: Sankt Jan, Sankt Thomas and Saint Croix.

St. Jan's lengths were 326.0 ft (99.36 m) overall and 310.8 ft (94.7 m) registered. Her beam was 40.7 ft (12.4 m) and her depth was 18.8 ft (5.7 m). Her tonnages were 2,478 GRT, 1,597 NRT, and 3,285 DWT. She had space for 186 passengers: 53 in first class, and 133 on deck. Her holds had capacity for 147,000 cubic feet (4,200 m^{3}) of grain, or 140,000 cubic feet (4,000 m^{3}) of baled cargo.

ØK registered St. Jan at Copenhagen. Her code letters were NQHR.

== Nickerie ==
In 1912 the Koninklijke Nederlandse Stoomboot-Maatschappij (KNSM, the "Royal Dutch Steamboat Company") took over The Koninklijke West-Indische Maildienst (KWIM, the "Royal West Indian Mail Service"), which served the Dutch colonies of Surinam and Curaçao.

In 1913 KNSM bought St. Jan and St. Thomas for its KWIM subsidiary. It renamed them Nickerie and Commewijne respectively, after the Nickerie and Commewijne rivers in Surinam. Nickerie was registered at Amsterdam in the Netherlands, and her code letters were PMRF. By 1914 Nickerie was equipped for wireless telegraphy. By 1918 her call sign was PER.

In August 1915 Nickerie was in Haiti during the first week of the US occupation. On 28 July, Cacos rebels in Haiti lynched President Vilbrun Guillaume Sam, and the USA responded by landing 330 US Marines at Port-au-Prince.

The commander of US forces in Haiti, Admiral Caperton, believed Nickerie was carrying a consignment of arms and ammunition, so on 2 August one of his staff officers advised Nickerie's Captain not land them at any port en route. But Caperton's report seems confused. In his entry for 2 August he stated that the arms were destined for the Government of Haiti, but in his entry for the next day he stated that they were for Cacos rebel leader Rosalvo Bobo. Caperton then stated that Nickerie landed her cargo at Petite-Anse, and that it contained no arms.

On 3 or 4 August Nickerie was at Gonaïves. From there her Captain advised Caperton by wireless telegraph that a crowd was trying to loot the Custom House. Caperton responded by ordering a detachment from the cruiser USS Washington to load a tugboat with light artillery and go to Gonaïves to restore order. On 6 August Nickerie left Saint-Marc and reached Petit-Goâve. She reported to Caperton that both places were quiet. On 7 August she called at Miragoâne. She reported to Caperton that the town was quiet, but there had been fighting there a few days before.

As part of the Allied blockade of the Central Powers in the First World War, the Royal Navy used to stop and search ships passing in and out of neutral states such as the Netherlands that neighboured Germany. In October 1916 the Royal Navy searched Nickerie and the ocean liner Zeelandia, and seized all the mail they were carrying.

On 20 March 1918 President Woodrow Wilson issued Proclamation 1436, authorising the seizure under angary of Dutch ships in US ports. The next day, the US seized Nickerie. She was vested in the United States Shipping Board and managed by the Emergency Fleet Corporation. She was returned to her owners in 1919. By 1930 she was equipped with wireless direction finding.

== Risveglio ==
In 1932 or 1933 Ignazio Messina & Co bought Nickerie and Commewijne, and renamed them Risveglio and Progresso respectively. The names mean "Awakening" and "Progress". Risveglio was registered at Genoa in Italy, and her code letters were NQHR.

== Har Zion ==
In 1934 or 1935 Palestine Maritime Lloyd (PML) bought Risveglio and Progresso and renamed them הַר צִיּוֹן (Har Zion) and הַר הַכַּרְמֶל (Har Carmel) respectively, after Mount Zion and Mount Carmel in Palestine. Har Zion was registered at Famagusta in Cyprus, and her call sign was VQSF.

In 1937 a fire badly damaged Har Carmel. In January 1938 she was grounded at Constanța in Romania, declared a total loss, and sold for scrap.

On 1 September the Second World War began. On 7 September Har Zion left İzmir in Turkey. For the next two months she traded in the Eastern Mediterranean, calling at Limassol in Cyprus, Haifa in Palestine, and Port Said in Egypt, before heading for Wales. She called at Gibraltar, and reached Newport on 2 December. She called at Cardiff, and then on 17 January 1940 left Milford Haven for her return voyage. She called at Gibraltar, and on 2 February reached Beirut in Lebanon.

On 12 February 1940 Har Zion left Beirut. She called at Haifa, Jaffa, and Gibraltar, where she joined Convoy HG 21F, which was bound for Liverpool. In home waters Har Zion detached for an anchorage in the Thames Estuary off Southend-on-Sea, where she arrived on 9 March. From there she entered the Port of London, and docked in the Royal Docks.

Har Zion lacked a Second Engineer, so Victoria Drummond, the first woman engineer officer in the UK Merchant Navy, applied for the job. PML's representative was sceptical of employing a woman, but impressed by her qualifications, and by her previous service for Blue Funnel Line and the British India Steam Navigation Company, so he offered her the job with immediate effect.

Drummond said that Har Zion's officers and men were of numerous nationalities: Arab, British, Czech, Egyptian, German, Hungarian, Russian, and Spanish, and the ship's dog was Polish. Drummond found disciplinary problems with the engine room crew, which in due course she brought under control.

On 22 March Har Zion left The Downs anchorage off the east coast of Kent, and the next day she arrived in Antwerp, where a Greek Third Engineer joined the crew. There the ship was dry docked, and Drummond supervised three weeks of repairs to her furnaces and boilers, which enabled the ship to obtain a Lloyd's classification certificate. Lloyd's Register certified her "100A-", which is a rank below the top "100A1".

On 13 or 14 April Har Zion left Antwerp. She anchored at The Downs, from where she joined Convoy OA 133GF from Southend. This became Convoy OG 27F, which dispersed at sea. Har Zion called at Lisbon, Gibraltar, Beirut, and Jaffa, and reached Haifa on 14 May.

On 18 May the ship left Haifa. She called at Port Said and Alexandria, and then at Marseille, whence she evacuated the British consul and part of the British Expeditionary Force before the French capitulation to Germany and Italy. She landed them at Gibraltar, where she joined Convoy HG 37, which was bound for Liverpool. Drummond then left the ship, because she and the Third Engineer had clashed.

== Loss and wreck ==
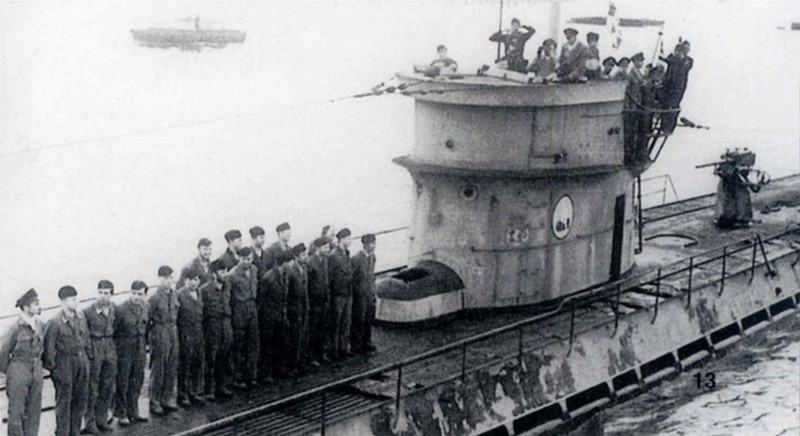
U-38 and her crew

In Liverpool Har Zion loaded a cargo of 1,000 cases of spirits and 120 tons of fertilizer, bound for Savannah, Georgia. On 29 August she left Liverpool with Convoy OB 205, but she straggled. OB 205 left the Irish Sea via the North Channel, and dispersed in the North Atlantic the next day.

At 06:15 hrs on 31 August U-38 fired a spread of two torpedoes, one of which hit Har Zion. She sank, stern-first, about 110 nautical miles (200 km) northwest of Malin Head in Ireland. The next day a Polish destroyer, ORP Błyskawica, rescued a seaman, Osman Adem, who was Har Zion's sole survivor.

Her wreck is in the Western Approaches at position 56°20′N 10°00′W, at a depth of about 5,600 feet (1,700 m). It is on a part of Europe's North Atlantic continental margin called the Donegal Fan, just southeast of the Hebrides Terrace Seamount.

== Bibliography ==
- Caperton, William Banks (1915). Haitian Campaign of 1915. Annual Reports of the Secretary of the Navy. Washington, DC: United States Department of the Navy – via Naval History and Heritage Command.
- De Boer, MG (1922). Geschiedenis der Amsterdamsche stoomvaart (in Dutch). Vol. IIb. Amsterdam: Scheltema & Holkema's Boekhandel – via Delpher.
- Drummond, Cherry (1994). The Remarkable Life of Victoria Drummond – Marine Engineer. London: Institute of Marine Engineers. ISBN 0-907206-54-9.
- Lloyd's Register of British and Foreign Shipping. Vol. I.–Steamers. London: Lloyd's Register of Shipping. 1908 – via Internet Archive.
- Lloyd's Register of British and Foreign Shipping. Vol. I.–Steamers. London: Lloyd's Register of Shipping. 1910 – via Internet Archive.
- Lloyd's Register of Shipping. Vol. I.–Steamers. London: Lloyd's Register of Shipping. 1914 – via Internet Archive.
- Lloyd's Register of Shipping (PDF). Vol. II.–Steamers and Motorships of 300 Tons Gross and Over. London: Lloyd's Register of Shipping. 1930 – via Southampton City Council.
- Lloyd's Register of Shipping (PDF). Vol. II.–Steamers and Motorships of 300 Tons Gross and Over. London: Lloyd's Register of Shipping. 1932 – via Southampton City Council.
- Lloyd's Register of Shipping (PDF). Vol. II.–Steamers and Motorships of 300 Tons Gross and Over. London: Lloyd's Register of Shipping. 1933 – via Southampton City Council.
- Lloyd's Register of Shipping (PDF). Vol. II.–Steamers and Motorships of 300 Tons Gross and Over. London: Lloyd's Register of Shipping. 1934 – via Southampton City Council.
- Lloyd's Register of Shipping (PDF). Vol. II.–Steamers and Motorships of 300 Tons Gross and Over. London: Lloyd's Register of Shipping. 1935 – via Southampton City Council.
- Lloyd's Register of Shipping (PDF). Vol. I.–Steamers and Motorships of 300 Tons. Trawlers, Tugs, Dredgers, etc. London: Lloyd's Register of Shipping. 1940 – via Southampton City Council.
- The Marconi Press Agency Ltd (1918). The Year Book of Wireless Telegraphy and Telephony. London: The Wireless Press, Ltd.
- Mercantile Navy List. London. 1935 – via Crew List Index Project.
