= USS Zeelandia =

Dutch-owned ocean liner that was a US Navy troopship in 1918 and 1919

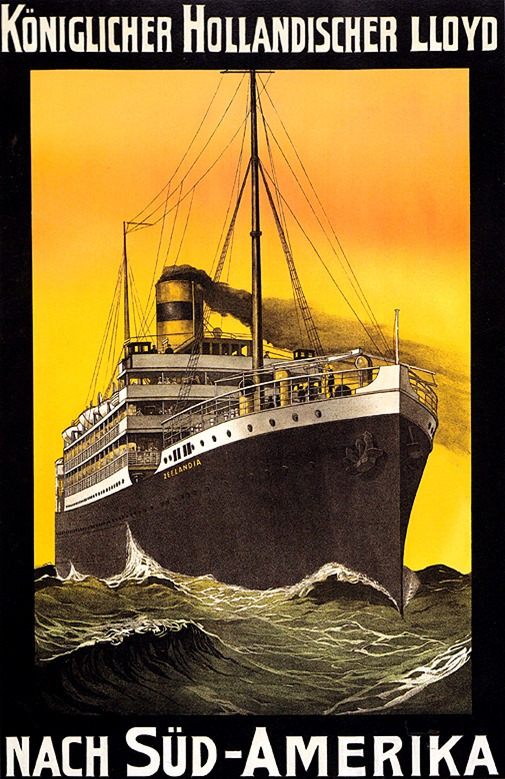
- KHL poster featuring Zeelandia

History

Netherlands
- Name: Zeelandia
- Namesake: Zeeland
- Owner: Koninklijke Hollandsche Lloyd
- Operator: (United States) US Navy (1918–19)
- Port of registry: (Netherlands) Amsterdam
- Route: Amsterdam – Buenos Aires
- Builder: A Stephen & Sons, Glasgow
- Yard number: 436
- Launched: 26 April 1910
- Completed: June 1910
- Acquired: March 1918
- Commissioned: 3 April 1918
- Decommissioned: 16 October 1919
- Out of service: laid up from February 1935
- Identification: code letters QDBC; by 1913: call sign MKZ; 1914: call sign PBI; 1918: ID number ID–2507; by 1934: call sign PIXB
- Fate: Scrapped in 1936

General characteristics
- Type: Ocean liner
- Tonnage: 7,995 GRT, 4,960 NRT, 7,420 DWT
- Displacement: 11,500 tons
- Length: 440.0 ft (134.1 m)
- Beam: 55.7 ft (17.0 m)
- Draft: 27 ft 0 in (8.23 m)
- Depth: 34.0 ft (10.4 m)
- Decks: 2
- Installed power: 953 NHP, 5,800 ihp
- Propulsion: 2 × screws; 2 × triple-expansion engines
- Speed: 14 knots (26 km/h)
- Capacity: passengers: 102 × 1st class, 108 × 2nd class, 854 × steerage; cargo: 282,000 cu ft (8,000 m^{3}) grain, 267,000 cu ft (7,600 m^{3}) bale
- Complement: in US Navy: 322
- Sensors & processing systems: by 1911: submarine signalling; by 1930: wireless direction finding
- Armament: 4 × 6-inch (150 mm) guns; 2 × 1-pounder guns; 2 × machine guns

USS Zeelandia was an ocean liner that was built in Scotland in 1910 and scrapped in the Netherlands in 1936. She was the largest ship in the Koninklijke Hollandsche Lloyd (KHL) fleet from 1910 until the liners Gelria and Tubantia were completed in 1913 and 1914. She was USS Zeelandia from April 1918 until October 1919, when she was a United States Navy troopship.

== Building ==
In 1909 KHL took delivery of two new twin-screw sister ships for its route between the Netherlands and the Río de la Plata. Hollandia was built by Alexander Stephen and Sons in Glasgow, and Frisia was built by Koninklijke Maatschappij 'De Schelde' in Vlissingen. Each had a registered length of about 420 ft (130 m) and tonnage of more than 7,000 GRT. In 1910 Alexander Stephen & Sons built one ship to a slightly enlarged version of the design, which was launched as Zeelandia.

Zeelandia was built as yard number 436, launched on 26 April 1910, and completed that June. Her registered length was 440.0 ft (134.1 m), her beam was 55.7 ft (17.0 m) and her depth was 34.0 ft (10.4 m). Her tonnages were 7,995 GRT, 4,960 NRT and 7,420 DWT. She had berths for 1,064 passengers: 102 first class, 108 2nd class, and 854 steerage. Her holds had capacity for 282,000 cu ft (8,000 m^{3}) of grain or 267,000 cu ft (7,600 m^{3}) of baled cargo.

The ship had twin screws, each driven by a three-cylinder triple-expansion steam engine. The combined power of her twin engines was rated at 953 NHP or 5,800 ihp, and gave her a speed of 14 knots (26 km/h).

KHL registered Zeelandia at Amsterdam. Her code letters were QDBC. By 1911 she was equipped for submarine signalling and wireless telegraphy. By 1913 her call sign was MKZ, but by 1914 it had been changed to PBI.

== First World War ==
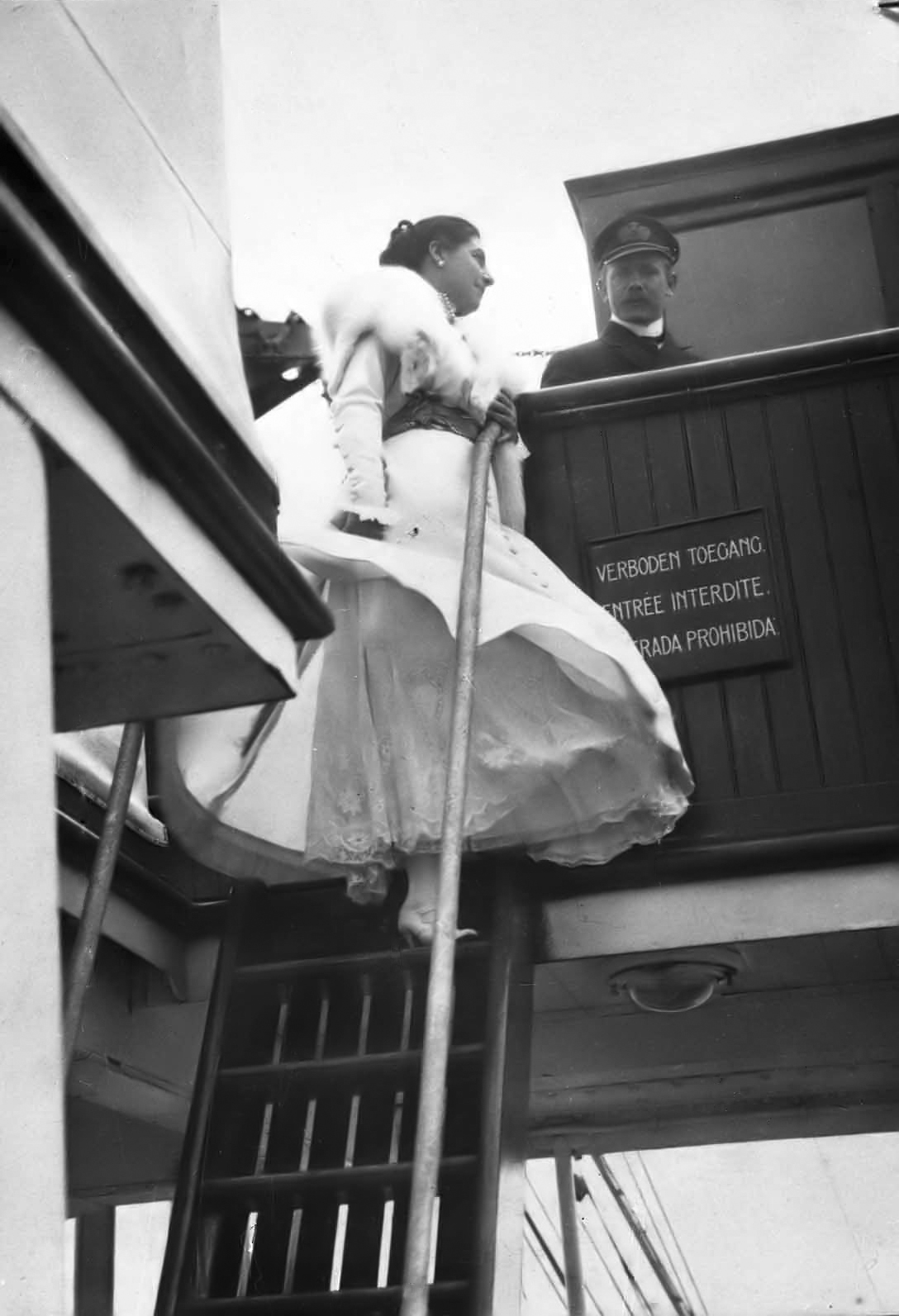
Mata Hari aboard Zeelandia in November 1916

As part of the Allied blockade of the Central Powers in the First World War, the Royal Navy used to stop and search ships passing in and out of neutral states such as the Netherlands that neighboured Germany. In October 1916 the Royal Navy searched Zeelandia and the KNSM steamship Nickerie, and seized all the mail they were carrying.

In November 1916 Mata Hari sailed on Zeelandia from Spain to Falmouth, where British police arrested her.

== Troop ship ==
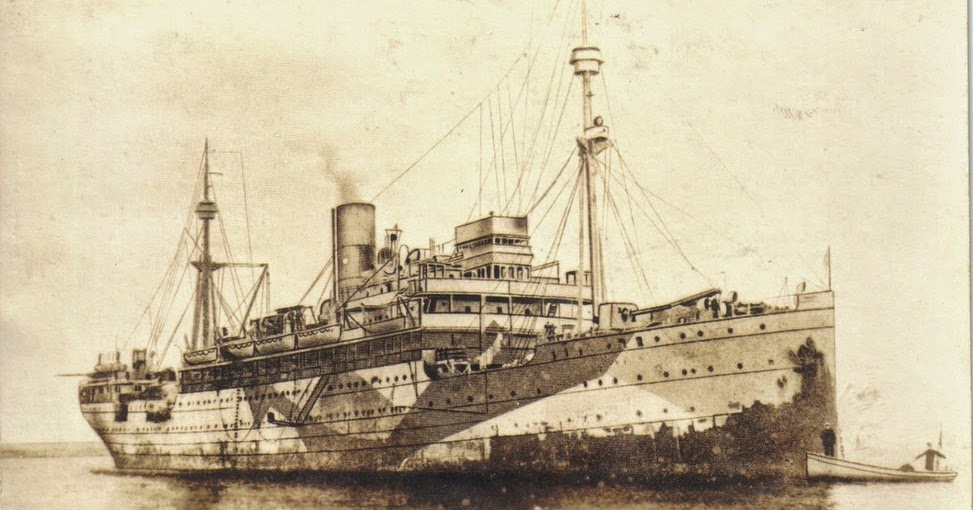
Zeelandia in dazzle camouflage as a troopship

On 20 March 1917 President Woodrow Wilson proclaimed the seizure by angary of Dutch merchant ships in US ports. Three days later the Third Naval District inspected Zeelandia and recommended her conversion into a troopship. On 3 April 1918 she was commissioned into the US Navy as USS Zeelandia, with the ID number ID–2507. Commander Robert Henderson was her first commander. She was defensively armed with four 6-inch (150 mm) guns, two 1-pounder guns, and two machine guns

The US Navy assigned Zeelandia to the Newport News Division of the Cruiser and Transport Force. Between her commissioning and the Armistice of 11 November 1918 she made five transatlantic round trips between the US and Europe, in which she carried 8,349 passengers, nost of them troops. She claimed to have sighted and engaged several German U-boats in that time. However, the only verified engagement was on 31 August 1918, when a U-boat surfaced to try to attack a convoy in which Zeelandia was sailing. The convoy's zig-zag course, and the strength of its escort, prevented the U-boat from pressing home its attack.

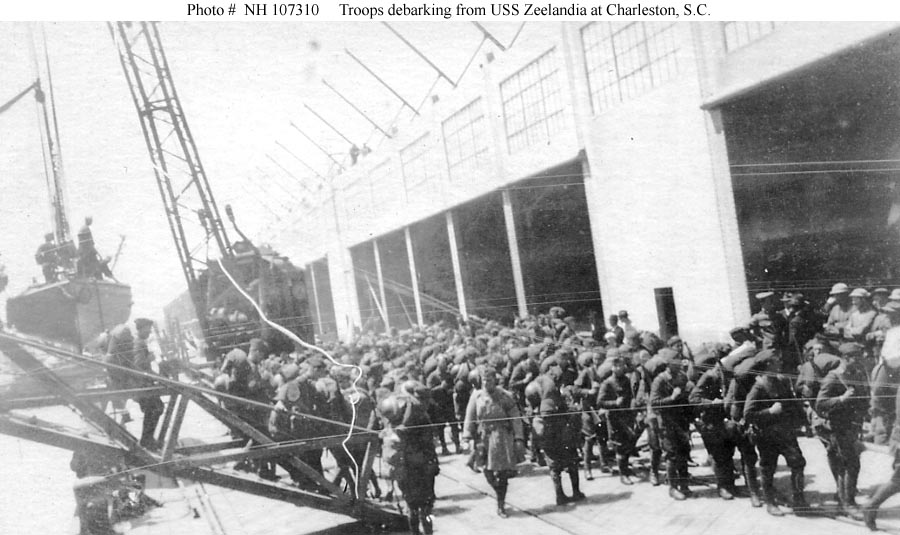
Repatriated US troops disembarking from Zeelandia at Charleston, South Carolina

After the Armistice, Zeelandia made another seven transatlantic round trips. She repatriated a total of 15,737 troops to the US, and took 3,170 passengers to Europe. On 31 July 1919 she was transferred to the Commandant of the Third Naval District for disposal. On 6 October she was decommissioned, stricken from the Navy list, and returned to her owner.

== Later career ==
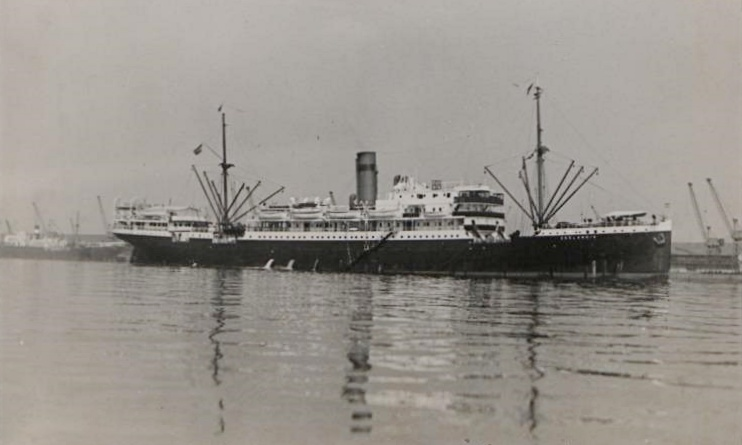
Zeelandia in civilian service

Zeelandia was refitted at Glasgow for her return to service as a civilian ocean liner. She returned to Amsterdam in July 1920.

By 1930 Zeelandia was equipped with wireless direction finding. By 1934 the four-letter call sign PIXB had replaced her code letters and three-letter call sign.

From February 1935 Zeelandia was laid up at Amsterdam. In April 1936 she was sold for scrap for 123,356 guilders to Frank Rijsdijk's Industrieële Ondernemingen. On 8 May 1936 the tugboat Witte Zee towed her to Hendrik-Ido-Ambacht to be broken up.

== Bibliography ==
- Harnack, Edwin P (1930) [1903]. All About Ships & Shipping (4th ed.). London: Faber and Faber.
- Lloyd's Register of British and Foreign Shipping. Vol. II.–Steamers. London: Lloyd's Register of Shipping. 1911 – via Internet Archive.
- Lloyd's Register of Shipping (PDF). Vol. II.–Steamers and Motorships of 300 Tons Gross and Over. London: Lloyd's Register of Shipping. 1930 – via Southampton City Council.
- Lloyd's Register of Shipping (PDF). Vol. II.–Steamers and Motorships of 300 Tons Gross and Over. London: Lloyd's Register of Shipping. 1934 – via Southampton City Council.
- The Marconi Press Agency Ltd (1913). The Year Book of Wireless Telegraphy and Telephony. London: The St Katherine Press.
- The Marconi Press Agency Ltd (1914). The Year Book of Wireless Telegraphy and Telephony. London: The Marconi Press Agency Ltd.
