= John le Strange, 1st Baron Strange of Knockyn =

Coat of arms of John le Strange, Lord of Knockin, Gules, two lions passant Argent..

John le Strange, 1st Baron Strange of Knockyn (c.1253-1309), Lord of Knockyn was an English noble. He fought in the wars in Wales, Gascony and Scotland. He was a signatory of the Baron's Letter to Pope Boniface VIII in 1301.

== Biography ==
John was the eldest son of John le Strange and Joan de Somery, and a grandson of Marcher Lord John Lestrange and Roger de Somery II, Baron of Dudley Castle.

His great-grandfather was the Earl William d'Aubigny of Arundel Castle, grandson of Queen Adeliza of Louvain, a direct descendant of Charlemagne through Herbert II, Count of Vermandois.

Through his great-grandmother Mabel of Chester, wife of William and daughter of Hugh of Cyfeiliog, 5th Earl of Chester, he was also a descendant of Henry I of England and William the Conqueror.

Le Strange fought in the Edwardian conquest of Wales, the Gascon War, and the Wars of Scottish Independence, along his uncle, Commander Roger le Strange, Baron Strange.

He was involved in the siege of Caerlaverock Castle along with Thomas, 2nd Earl of Lancaster, and the Siege of Stirling Castle in 1304 against Sir William Oliphant.

He was a signatory of the Baron's Letter to Pope Boniface VIII in 1301. He is recorded having debts toward Italian bankers, Acius Jacobin of Florence and Pelegrin de Kyatrino of Lucca, as well to Nutus of Florence, King Edward I's merchant.

During the reign of Edward II of England, Le Strange is recorded having a manor in Warwickshire, held for knight's service to Guy de Beauchamp, 10th Earl of Warwick, a manor in Cambridge for the same reason to Robert Orford, Bishop of Ely, and other manors in Gloucester, Oxford and Salop.

== Marriages and issue ==
John married firstly to Alianora, daughter of Ebulo de Montibus, governor of Windsor Castle. Her brother was the governor of both Stirling Castle and Edinburgh Castle. By his second wife Joan de Bohun, John had the following issue:

- John le Strange
- Hamo le Strange
- Eubulo le Strange (died 1335), married Alice de Lacy, Countess of Lincoln, widow of Thomas, 2nd Earl of Lancaster, of the royal House of Lancaster, and was without issue.

He married thirdly Maud, daughter of John de Walton, they had the following issue:

- John la Strange of Walton d' Eiville
- Elizabeth le Strange, who married Lord Gruffydd ap Madog of Rhythallt; they were the parents of the Welsh prince Gruffudd Fychan II. Their grandsons were the last Welsh prince of Wales, Owen Glendower, and his brother Lord Tudor Glendower.
