= Cherry Drummond, 16th Baroness Strange =

British writer and peer (1928–2005)

The Right Honourable The Baroness Strange

Member of the House of Lords
- Lord Temporal
- Hereditary peerage 10 December 1986 – 11 November 1999
- Preceded by: The 15th Baron Strange
- Succeeded by: Seat abolished
- Elected Hereditary Peer; 11 November 1999 – 11 March 2005
- Election: 1999
- Preceded by: Seat established
- Succeeded by: The 2nd Viscount Montgomery of Alamein

Personal details
- Born: Jean Cherry Drummond; 17 December 1928 London, England
- Died: 11 March 2005 (aged 76) Megginch Castle, Perthshire, Scotland
- Party: Cross bench
- Spouse: Humphrey Evans (m. 1952)
- Children: 6, including Adam Drummond, 17th Baron Strange
- Parents: John Drummond, 15th Baron Strange; Violet Jardine
- Relatives: Victoria Drummond (paternal aunt); Geraldine Somerville (niece)
- Education: St Andrews University; University of Cambridge
- Occupation: Peer, writer

Jean Cherry Drummond of Megginch, 16th Baroness Strange (London, 17 December 1928 – Megginch Castle, 11 March 2005) was a cross bench hereditary peer in the House of Lords. She also wrote romantic novels and historical works as Cherry Evans.

== Personal life ==
Strange was educated at Oxenfoord Castle boarding school near Edinburgh, at St Andrews University (where she read English and history) and at the University of Cambridge. She married Humphrey ap Evans, MC, a captain in the Mountain Artillery, in 1952. They both assumed the surname Drummond of Megginch when they moved to Megginch Castle. The couple had three sons and three daughters:

- Adam Humphrey Drummond, 17th Baron Strange (b. 1953)
- The Hon Charlotte Cherry Drummond (b. 1955)
- The Hon Humphrey John Jardine Drummond (b. 1961)
- The Hon Amelie Margaret Mary Drummond (b. 1963): married in 1990 Philippe de MacMahon, 4th Duc de Magenta
- The Hon John Humphrey Hugo Drummond (b. 1966)
- The Hon Catherine Star Violetta Drummond (b. 1967)

In April 2006 it emerged that Lady Strange had changed her will on her deathbed, leaving her entire estate to her youngest daughter, Catherine, cutting out her other five children.

The actress Geraldine Somerville is her niece.

== Title ==
Although the family home is the 17th-century Megginch Castle in Perthshire, Scotland, the family title, Baron Strange, is in the English peerage. Her father, John Drummond, 15th Baron Strange, had spent many years attempting to terminate an abeyance that arose on the death of the Duke of Atholl in 1957; he was confirmed in the title in 1965. The title went into abeyance once again on his death in 1982, but it was terminated in Cherry's favour in 1986, and she made her maiden speech on 4 March 1987. Upon the Baroness's death the title was inherited by her eldest son, Adam.

== Politics and public life ==
She held traditional conservative views, but resigned the Conservative Party whip in December 1998 when William Hague dismissed Lord Cranborne for negotiating with Tony Blair on reform of the House of Lords. Following reforms which reduced the number of hereditary peers who were entitled to sit in the House of Lords, her 1999 manifesto to be elected to occupy one of the remaining seats (limited to 75 words) was "I bring flowers every week to this House from my castle in Perthshire." She was elected to fill a cross bench seat.

She was president of the War Widows Association of Great Britain from 1990.

== Writing ==
Strange wrote several romantic novels under the pen name "Cherry Evans", including Love from Belinda (1960), Lalage in Love (1962), Creatures Great and Small (1968) and Love Is for Ever (1988). As Cherry Drummond, she wrote The Remarkable Life of Victoria Drummond – Marine Engineer, a biography of her aunt, Victoria Drummond, the first woman marine engineer in the UK, sailed as an engineer for 40 years and received awards for bravery under enemy fire during World War II as an engineering officer in the British Merchant Navy.

Peerage of England
Preceded by John Drummond	Baroness Strange; 1986–2005; Member of the House of Lords (1986–1999)	Succeeded by Adam Drummond
Parliament of the United Kingdom
New office created by the House of Lords Act 1999	Elected hereditary peer to the House of Lords under the House of Lords Act 1999; 1999–2005	Succeeded by The Viscount Montgomery of Alamein
