= James Stewart-Murray, 9th Duke of Atholl =

Scottish peer and soldier

James Stewart-Murray
- 9th Duke of Atholl
- Arms of the Duke of Atholl

Duke of Atholl
- Reign: 16 March 1942 – 8 May 1957
- Predecessor: John Stewart-Murray
- Successor: Iain Murray
- Born: 18 August 1879
- Died: 8 May 1957 (aged 77)
- Noble family: Stewart-Murray
- Father: John Stewart-Murray, 7th Duke of Atholl
- Mother: Louisa Moncreiffe
- Military career
- Branch: British Army
- Rank: Major
- Units: Queen's Own Cameron Highlanders; Scottish Horse
- Conflicts: Second Boer War; First World War
- Awards: Mentioned in Despatches

James Thomas Stewart-Murray, 9th Duke of Atholl, 14th Baron Strange, 8th Baron Percy (18 August 1879 – 8 May 1957), styled Lord James Stewart-Murray until 1942, was a Scottish peer and soldier.

Stewart-Murray was the fourth and youngest son of John Stewart-Murray, 7th Duke of Atholl, and Louisa Moncreiffe, daughter of Thomas Moncreiffe of that Ilk, 7th Baronet. He was educated at Eton and commissioned a second lieutenant in the 1st Battalion of the Queen's Own Cameron Highlanders on 3 January 1900. The following month, he left for South Africa to fight in the Second Boer War. With his battalion, he took part in operations in the Transvaal May and June 1900, including action near Johannesburg and Pretoria (early June 1900) and the Battle of Diamond Hill (11–12 June 1900); and in the Orange River Colony June to November 1900, including action at Wittebergen and Ladybrand. He was promoted to lieutenant on 29 May 1901, and subsequently seconded to serve with the 2nd Regiment of Scottish Horse, a yeomanry regiment raised from troops recruited by his father. For his service in the war, he was mentioned in dispatches and won two medals and six clasps. After the end of the war in South Africa in June 1902, he returned in January 1903 to his regiment.

He later fought in the First World War, where he was wounded, captured, and held as a Prisoner of War. He resigned from the army as a major. He became a Freemason in Lodge St. John, No. 14 (now the United Lodge of Dunkeld) at the same time as his elder brother George in 1914. In 1942, aged 62, he succeeded his elder brother John Stewart-Murray, 8th Duke of Atholl in the dukedom.

Atholl died unmarried in May 1957, aged 77. On his death, the barony of Strange fell into abeyance while the barony of Percy was passed on to his kinsman Hugh Percy, 10th Duke of Northumberland. The baronies of Murray and Glenlyon and earldom of Strange became extinct. He was succeeded in the dukedom of Atholl and in other Scottish titles by a distant relative, Iain Murray, 10th Duke of Atholl, his fourth cousin twice removed, who was descended from George Murray, Bishop of St David's, second son of the eighteenth century 3rd Duke.

Peerage of England
Preceded by John Stewart-Murray	Baron Strange; 1628 creation 1942–1957	Vacant Abeyant Title next held by John Drummond
Peerage of Great Britain
Preceded by John Stewart-Murray	Earl Strange; 1942–1957	Extinct
Preceded by John Stewart-Murray	Baron Percy; 1942–1957	Succeeded by Hugh Percy
Peerage of the United Kingdom
Preceded by John Stewart-Murray	Baron Glenlyon; 1942–1957	Extinct
Peerage of Scotland
Preceded by John Stewart-Murray	Duke of Atholl; 1942–1957	Succeeded by George Iain Murray
