= Knockin Castle =

Castle in Shropshire, England

Coordinates: 52.79414°N 2.98913°W

Knockin Castle by T.F. Dukes

Knockin Castle is situated in the village of Knockin on Shropshire between Oswestry and Shrewsbury (grid reference SJ334223), England.

This was a fortified residence on level ground founded by Guy le Strange between 1154 and 1160 and it remained the principal holding of the le Strange family for most of the Middle Ages. The castle was damaged in the First Barons' War during the reign of King John and then repaired by John le Strange. Leland described it as being 'ruinous' in 1540.

All that remains of Knockin Castle today is a large tree-covered mound of earth with natural running streams around it. The remaining mound height includes stone bricks and provides enough clues that the original fortification was set on level ground.
