= Knockin =

Village and civil parish in Shropshire, England

Coordinates: 52°47′38″N 2°59′35″W

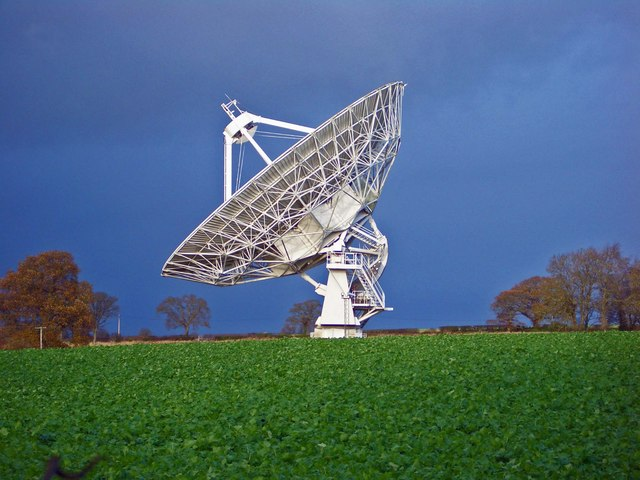
- Knockin's MERLIN Radio Telescope

- Location within Shropshire
- Population: 282 (2011)
- OS grid reference: SJ330223
  - London: 150 miles SE
- Civil parish: Knockin
- Unitary authority: Shropshire
- Ceremonial county: Shropshire
- Region: West Midlands
- Country: England
- Sovereign state: United Kingdom
- Post town: Oswestry
- Postcode district: SY10
- Dialling code: 01691
- Police: West Mercia
- Fire: Shropshire
- Ambulance: West Midlands
- UK Parliament: North Shropshire

Knockin is a village and civil parish in north-west Shropshire, England. It is located on the B4396 road, around 5 miles (8.0 km) south-east of the town of Oswestry, and 11 1/2 miles (18.5 km) from the county town of Shrewsbury.

== History ==
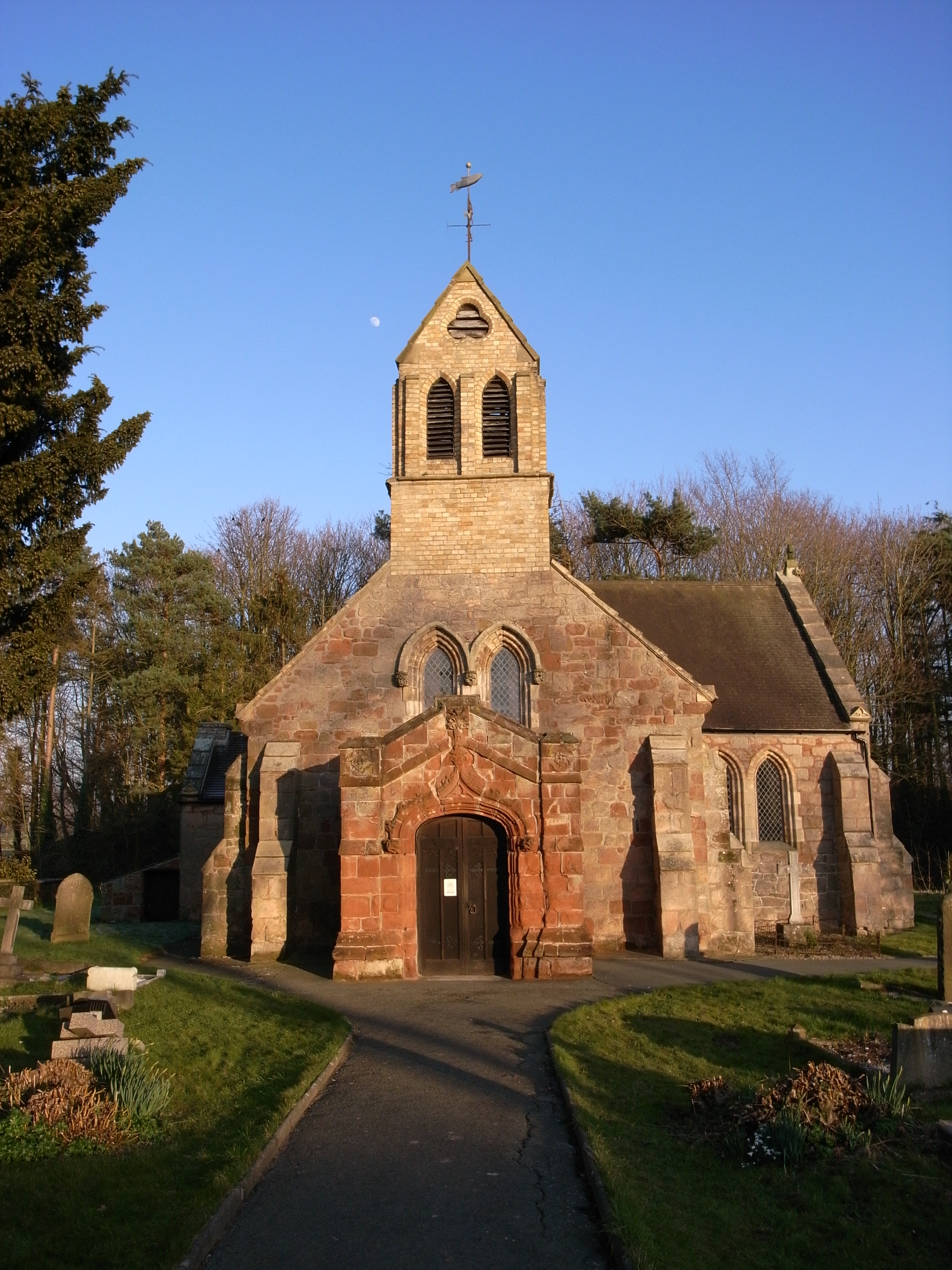
Church of St Mary

The former name of Knockin was Cnukyn. The village comprises mainly historic detached buildings in a rural setting. The Earl of Bradford owned much of Knockin until it was sold off in lots to meet other financial demands. The Earl still owns the cricket pitch and other small pockets of land in the area. The local public house is called the Bradford Arms and displays the Earl's Bridgeman family coat of arms. The pub also has a clock with three faces, hung outside above the main entrance. The motto displayed on the sign is that of the Bridgeman family "Nec temere nec timide" (Neither rashly nor timidly). There is a convenience store called 'The Knockin Shop'.

The village was struck by an F1/T2 tornado on 23 November 1981, as part of the record-breaking nationwide tornado outbreak on that day. The tornado later moved over Oswestry, causing further damage.

In 1990 a large part of the village was designated a historical conservation area by Shropshire Council, and it is home to a number of listed buildings.

== Knockin Castle ==
All that remains of Knockin Castle today is a large tree-covered mound of earth. The castle was of a motte and bailey design and was constructed between 1154 and 1160 under the authority of Guy le Strange. Ownership remained with the family for much of the Middle Ages, but by 1540 it was described as "ruinous". Like most Shropshire castles which are now only marked by grassy sites, its stones live on in a number of buildings in the area.

== Church ==
The parish church of St Mary was founded by Ralph Le Strange between 1182 and 1195 as a chapel for the castle. It has a Norman chancel, nave and north aisle but the building was heavily restored in 1846. Its graveyard was consecrated in 1817; before then at least some burials took place at Kinnerley. It contains CWGC-registered war graves of two officers and two soldiers of the British Army of World War I. Inside the church are several war-related memorials: a Roll of Honour for World War I and separate Rolls of Duty for both World Wars on wooden boards, a brass cross on marble plaque in the chancel to Captain Orlando F.C. Bridgeman of the 2nd Dragoon Guards who died while returning from active service in India in 1858, and stained glass window at the west end to Captain Edward William Walker of the Royal Welsh Fusiliers who was killed in action in Palestine in 1917.

== Radio telescope ==
One of the radio telescopes that make up the Jodrell Bank MERLIN (Multi-Element Radio Linked Interferometer Network) radio telescope array is in Knockin. The array links several observing stations that together form a powerful telescope.

== Sport ==
Knockin is the home of Knockin and Kinnerley Cricket Club. Established as a club in 1862 the club field four league teams, two mid-week teams, junior teams from under 9's to under 15's in addition to ladies and girls-only teams. In June 2018 the club was awarded the Queens Award for Voluntary Service (QAVS), the MBE for volunteer groups.

== Transport ==
Knockin is served by the number 576 bus between Oswestry and Shrewsbury.

== Notable residents ==
Vice-Admiral Charles Orlando Bridgeman (1791–1860) lived at Knockin Hall at time of his death.

== See also ==
- Listed buildings in Knockin
- Baron Strange
