= Osbaston, Oswestry =

Village in Shropshire, England

Coordinates: 52.798°N 3.008°W

Osbaston
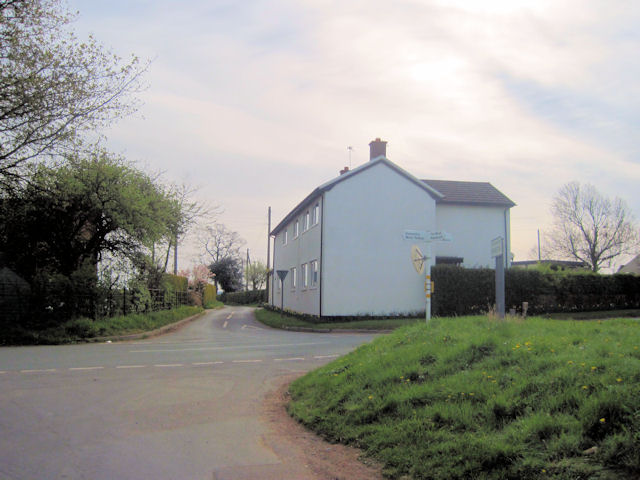
- Crossroads north of Osbaston

- Location within Shropshire
- OS grid reference: SJ321228
- Civil parish: Knockin
- Unitary authority: Shropshire
- Ceremonial county: Shropshire
- Region: West Midlands
- Country: England
- Sovereign state: United Kingdom
- Post town: OSWESTRY
- Postcode district: SY10
- Dialling code: 01691
- Police: West Mercia
- Fire: Shropshire
- Ambulance: West Midlands
- UK Parliament: North Shropshire

Osbaston is a small village in the English county of Shropshire.

Osbaston lies on the B4396 road some five miles to the south of Oswestry. The population at the 2011 census can be found in Knockin.
