= Humphrey Drummond of Megginch =

British soldier, author and falconer

Captain Humphrey Drummond of Megginch MC (18 September 1922 - 2 April 2009) born Humphrey ap Evans, was a British soldier, author and falconer.

== Life ==
Drummond was born Humphrey ap Evans at Old Buckenham, Norfolk, and was brought up largely in Wales. Educated at Eton and Trinity College, Cambridge, he was a point-to-point rider and later became known as a naturalist and country sportsman, particularly in falconry and wildfowling.

During the Second World War he served with the Royal Artillery, training with the 1st Mountain Regiment in 1942 and seeing action in north-west Europe, including the Battle of Walcheren Causeway in November 1944. Attached to 45 Commando as a forward observation officer, he was awarded the Military Cross for directing artillery fire under intense attack during the Rhine crossing in March 1945, and he was wounded later in the campaign.

After the war he passed the civil service exam for the Indian Political Service but did not take up an appointment following Indian independence. He helped found the Council for the Protection of Rural Wales (general secretary, 1947–51), was the National Trust's Welsh representative (1949–54), and served as a Gold Staff Officer at the Coronation in 1953.

In 1952 he married Cherry Drummond and, by decree of the Lord Lyon King of Arms, took, with her, the name "Drummond of Megginch" upon moving into Megginch Castle, (although she wrote sometimes as Cherry Evans, and he, sometimes, as Humphrey ap Evans) devoting much of his life to maintaining the Castle, its collections and grounds. He was chairman of the Society of Authors (Scotland) from 1975 to 1981. His wife became Lady Strange in 1986 and died in 2005; they had six children. Drummond himself died in 2009.

== Works ==
The King's Enemy: The Life of Francis Stewart 5th Earl of Bothwell is listed in his obituary, but does not seem to have been published.

Drummond's published works include:

- Falconry for You (1960) (as Humphrey ap Evans);
- Our Man in Scotland: Sir Ralph Sadleir 1507-1587 (1969) (as Humphrey Drummond);
- Falconry (1973) (as Humphrey ap Evans) ISBN 0851529216;
- The Queen's Man: James Hepburn, Earl of Bothwell and Duke of Orkney 1536-1578 (1975) (as Humphrey Drummond);
- Nazi Gold (1994/5) (as Humphrey Drummond).

=== Translations ===
- Le Grand Duc. A method of taking birds of prey with the aid of a trained eagle owl, by Carl-Georg Schilling (1968)
- La pêche au cormoran. A few words on fishing with the aid of a trained cormorant, by G. Sourbets (1968)
