= Megginch Castle =

Castle in Perth and Kinross, Scotland, UK

Coordinates: 56.4075°N 3.2301°W

Designations

Inventory of Gardens and Designed Landscapes in Scotland
- Official name: Megginch Castle
- Designated: 1 July 1987
- Reference no.: GDL00278

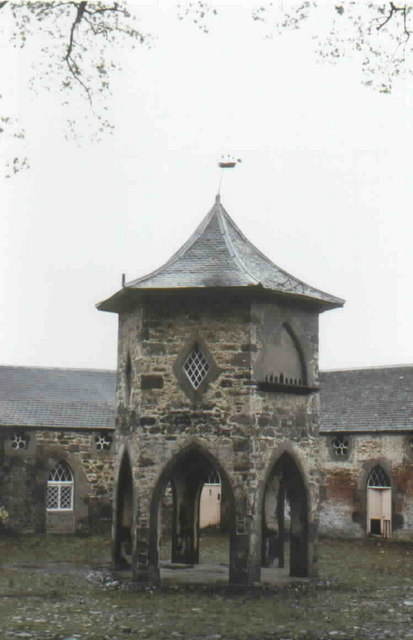

Megginch Castle is a 15th-century castle in Perth and Kinross, in central Scotland. It was the family home of Cherry, 16th Baroness Strange. It is now lived in by Lady Strange's daughter, Catherine Drummond-Herdman, her husband and four children.

Megginch Castle is a private family home, which is open for only special events. The gardens are home to trees such as ancient yews, there is a topiary, and in the spring there is an extensive display of daffodils. The orchard contains two National Plant Collections of Scottish apples, and pears, and cider apples. The gardens are listed on the Inventory of Gardens and Designed Landscapes in Scotland. The Gardens are open once a year under the Scotland's Gardens Scheme.
