= Australian peers and baronets =

Hereditary titles held by Australians

Peers of the Realm have been associated with Australia since early in its history as a British settlement. Many peers served as governors of the Australian colonies (states following Federation), and in the days when the practice of appointing British governors-general was current, the great majority were peers.

Australians themselves were previously eligible to receive British Imperial Honours. Such honours, in appropriate cases, included peerages and baronetcies. In other cases, already-extant peerages and baronetcies devolved upon persons who emigrated to Australia, or whose ancestors had emigrated to Australia.

Peerage titles bestowed included some distinctly Australian titles, such as Viscount Bruce of Melbourne. Imperial Honours were recommended to the sovereign by the prime minister of Australia, an Australian state premier, or sometimes by the prime minister of the United Kingdom. Some Australians have been awarded peerages in recognition of services rendered in the United Kingdom, rather than Australia.

The practice of awarding British Imperial Honours for services rendered in Australia generally came to a halt when Malcolm Fraser, the last Australian prime minister to make nominations for Imperial Honours, lost the 1983 election to Bob Hawke, who discontinued the practice in favour of nominations solely for the Australian Honours System. (There had previously been a brief hiatus in the recommendation of Imperial Honours under Gough Whitlam, 1972–75.) Despite the discontinuance of nominations on a federal level, individual states such as Queensland and Tasmania continued to recommend Imperial Honours until 1989. Australians who render service in the United Kingdom and other realms which continue to make nominations for Imperial Honours (such as Papua New Guinea) continue to be eligible for nomination to Imperial Honours, including peerages, and already-extant peerages and baronetcies continue to be inherited according to the instrument of their creation.

Not all recommendations for peerages have been accepted. Malcolm Fraser's recommendation of a peerage for Sir John Kerr was not supported by the British prime minister, James Callaghan.

== Australians with hereditary peerages ==
The following hereditary peers are or were Australians by birth or residence.

=== Duke ===
- Manchester: Alexander Montagu, 13th Duke of Manchester, was born in Australia in 1962, making him an Australian citizen from birth; however, he has long resided in California. He succeeded to his father's dukedom in 2002. His younger brother, Lord Kimble Montagu, is also an Australian citizen and is the heir presumptive to the dukedom. Lord Kimble is an academic at Monash University, and his heir is his only son William Anthony Drogo Montagu (born 2000).

=== Marquess ===
- Sligo: Sebastian Browne, 12th Marquess of Sligo (born 1964), is a peer in the Peerage of Ireland. As Baron Monteagle he is also a peer in the Peerage of the United Kingdom. He emigrated to Australia in 1997, where he is a residential real estate agent.

=== Earl ===
- Brooke and Warwick: Guy David Greville, 9th Earl Brooke and 9th Earl of Warwick, resides in Perth, Western Australia, and inherited his father's titles in 1996.
- Dunmore: Malcolm Murray, 12th Earl of Dunmore, was born in Tasmania in 1946, and has lived there all his life.
- Lincoln: Robert Fiennes-Clinton, 19th Earl of Lincoln, the head of a branch of the Fiennes-Clinton family, is resident in Perth, Western Australia.
- Loudoun: Simon Abney-Hastings, 15th Earl of Loudoun, was born in Australia in 1974. In 2004, the television documentary Britain's Real Monarch presented evidence that his father, Michael Abney-Hastings, 14th Earl of Loudoun, was the rightful King of England. He lives in Wangaratta, and Melbourne, Victoria. He succeeded his father to the title in 2012, and in 2023 bore one of the two golden spurs in the procession into Westminster Abbey at the commencement of the Coronation of Charles III and Camilla.
- Portarlington: The 7th and current Earl of Portarlington maintains an address in Sydney as well as an address in Melrose, Scotland.
- Portland: Timothy Bentinck, 12th Earl of Portland, was born in Tasmania in 1953 while his father Henry Bentinck, later the 11th Earl, was working as a jackaroo on a sheep station there.
- Stradbroke: Keith Rous, 6th Earl of Stradbroke, lives in Victoria, after having left England at the age of 19. His grandfather, the 3rd Earl, had been Governor of Victoria from 1921 to 1926.
- Wilton: Francis Grosvenor, 8th Earl of Wilton, lives in Victoria and is a board member of the Victorian Opera. Like his kinsmen, many of whom assumed the surname Egerton-Warburton, he is in remainder to the Egerton baronetcy (created 1617).

=== Viscount ===
- Bolingbroke and St John: Nicholas St John, 9th Viscount Bolingbroke, lives in Sydney. He is also 10th Viscount St John and 13th Baronet of Lydiard Tregoze.
- Bruce of Melbourne: Stanley Bruce became Prime Minister in 1923, holding the office for six and a half years until he lost not only the 1929 election but also his own seat of Flinders. He later became High Commissioner to the United Kingdom and served there for thirteen years. In 1947 he became Viscount Bruce of Melbourne, of Westminster Gardens in the City of Westminster. He was childless and the viscountcy became extinct at his death.

=== Baron ===
- Baden-Powell: Michael Baden-Powell (1940–2023) was the 4th holder of the Baden-Powell barony (and the baronetcy of Bentley), and was the son of the 2nd Baron and the brother of the 3rd Baron. He migrated to Australia in 1965, and lived in Camberwell, Victoria. He was active in the Victorian Scouts movement. He was succeeded by his son, David Robert Baden-Powell, the current and 5th Baron.
- Baillieu: Sir Clive Baillieu was born in Australia and educated at Camberwell Grammar School, Melbourne Grammar School and the University of Melbourne, before moving to the UK, where he continued his studies at Magdalen College, Oxford. He was granted an hereditary peerage in 1953, as 1st Baron Baillieu, of Sefton in the Commonwealth of Australia and of Parkwood in the County of Surrey. He died in Melbourne in 1967 and was succeeded by his son William as 2nd Baron Baillieu. The current holder, James William Latham Baillieu, 3rd Baron Baillieu, maintains addresses in both London and Melbourne.
- Chesham: Charles Cavendish, 7th Baron Chesham, was born in Sydney and was educated at The King's School, Parramatta before moving to the United Kingdom.
- Clifford of Chudleigh: Lewis Clifford, 12th Baron Clifford of Chudleigh, was born in New Zealand and later lived in Tasmania and Victoria. He was educated at Xavier College in Melbourne and later moved to the United Kingdom.
- Dufferin and Claneboye: John Blackwood, 11th Baron Dufferin and Claneboye, resides in Orange, New South Wales.
- Huntingfield: William Vanneck, 5th Baron Huntingfield, was born in Gatton, Queensland, in 1883, and grew up there until the age of 14, when he moved to England. He inherited the barony from his uncle in 1915. He was later appointed Governor of Victoria and served in that post from 1934 to 1939.
- Inverchapel: Archibald Clark Kerr, 1st Baron Inverchapel, was born in New South Wales in 1882; his maternal grandfather was Sir John Robertson, five times premier of the colony. He emigrated to England in 1889 and entered the British diplomatic service in 1906. Knighted in 1935 while Ambassador to Iraq, he was raised to the peerage in 1946 as the 1st Baron Inverchapel, of Loch Eck in the County of Argyll, and subsequently served as the British ambassador to the United States until his retirement in 1948. He died childless in 1951, and his barony became extinct.
- Lindsay of Birker: James Lindsay, 3rd Baron Lindsay of Birker (born 1945), is a former Australian diplomat, serving in Chile, Laos, Bangladesh, Venezuela, Pakistan and Kenya. He succeeded his father to the Barony of Lindsay of Birker in 1994.
- Robinson: Roy Robinson, 1st Baron Robinson (1883-1952), was born in South Australia and died in Canada. He lived mainly in the United Kingdom, where he was knighted for his services to forestry in 1931, and raised to the peerage in 1947 as 1st Baron Robinson, of Kielder Forest in the County of Northumberland and of Adelaide in the Commonwealth of Australia. He had no surviving sons and his barony became extinct on his death.
- Stratheden and Campbell: David Campbell, 7th Baron Stratheden and Campbell, was born in Rockhampton in 1963 and succeeded his father in 2011. He lives at the Sunshine Coast.

== Australian peeresses by marriage ==
The following Australian women are not or were not the holders of peerages themselves but became peeresses by virtue of marrying a hereditary peer.

- Dartmouth: Fiona Campbell, an Australian born in Melbourne, is the current Countess of Dartmouth since her marriage in June 2009 to William Legge, 10th Earl of Dartmouth.
- Furness and Kenmare: Enid Maude Lindeman (died 1973), born and raised in Sydney, was twice a peeress by marriage, the first time by her third marriage in 1933 to the 1st Viscount Furness, who predeceased her, and the second time by her fourth marriage in 1943 to the 6th Earl of Kenmare, who also predeceased her. Her son from her second marriage, Frederick Cavendish, became the 7th Baron Waterpark in 1948 following the death of his uncle, the 6th Baron.
- Harewood: Patricia Lascelles, Dowager Countess of Harewood (1926–2018), was an Australian violinist and fashion model who became the second wife of George Lascelles, 7th Earl of Harewood on their marriage in Connecticut in 1967. She had previously borne him a son, the Hon. Mark Lascelles, in 1964. She was widowed in 2011 and the 8th Earl is the 7th Earl's son by his first wife.
- Tryon: Dale "Kanga" Tryon, Baroness Tryon (1948–1997), born in Melbourne.

== Hereditary peerages with Australian associations ==
Arms of the Baron Birdwood

A number of hereditary titles have been created for Britons that are associated with places in Australia.

- Barony of Birdwood (1938): Sir William Birdwood was a British military commander prominent at Gallipoli. After retirement from the army in 1930, Birdwood made a bid to become Governor-General of Australia. He had the backing of King George V. However, the Australian prime minister James Scullin insisted that his Australian nominee Sir Isaac Isaacs be appointed. The king ultimately felt bound to accept the advice of the prime minister, but he did not disguise his reluctance and displeasure.

In 1938 Birdwood was raised to the peerage, taking the title Baron Birdwood, of Anzac and of Totnes in the County of Devon. He died in 1951. The barony became extinct in 2015 on the death of his grandson, the 3rd Baron Birdwood.

- Barony of Gowrie (1935) and Viscountcy of Ruthven of Canberra (1945): These two titles were created for Alexander Hore-Ruthven, who was Governor of South Australia (1928–1934), Governor of New South Wales (1935–1936) and then Governor-General of Australia (1936–1945). The Barony's territorial designation is "of Canberra in the Commonwealth of Australia and of Dirleton in the County of East Lothian". The Viscountcy was created at the same time as the higher title "Earl of Gowrie". As the Viscountcy is the most senior subsidiary title of the Earldom, it is used as a courtesy title by the heir apparent to the Earldom. The current heir apparent to the Earldom is (Patrick Leo) Brer Ruthven, styled "Viscount Ruthven of Canberra" by courtesy.
- Barony of Dugan (1949): Sir Winston Dugan (1877–1951) was a British administrator. He served as Governor of South Australia from 1934 to 1939 then Governor of Victoria until 1949. He was also the Administrator of the Commonwealth on two occasions. He was created Baron Dugan of Victoria, of Lurgan in the County of Armagh, on 7 July 1949. The title became extinct upon his death.
- Viscountcy of Slim (1960): Field Marshal Sir William Slim (1891–1970) was a British military commander who had fought alongside Australians in both world wars, at Gallipoli, the Middle East and other places. He was Governor-General of Australia from 1952 to 1960, when he returned to England. On the initiative of the then prime minister Robert Menzies, Sir William and Lady Slim received Australian pensions and passports. In 1960 Slim was raised to the peerage, taking the title Viscount Slim, of Yarralumla in the Capital Territory of Australia and of Bishopston in the City and County of Bristol. He was succeeded upon his death by his son John (1927–2019). The current holder is his grandson Mark William Rawdon Slim, 3rd Viscount Slim.

== Other hereditary peers who served as Governors-General ==
There were other governors-general of Australia who were British hereditary peers but whose peerages pre-dated their assuming the office of governor-general, or who were raised to the peerage after assuming or leaving office but with titles that contain no references to places in Australia:

Name of person	Title in office	Title at death	Notes
John Hope	7th Earl of Hopetoun	1st Marquess of Linlithgow	He was created Marquess of Linlithgow in October 1902, after he had left Australia, but while he was still formally governor-general; his term continued until January 1903.
Hallam Tennyson	2nd Baron Tennyson	2nd Baron Tennyson	
Henry Northcote	1st Baron Northcote	1st Baron Northcote	
William Ward	2nd Earl of Dudley	2nd Earl of Dudley	
Thomas Denman	3rd Baron Denman	3rd Baron Denman	
Henry Forster	1st Baron Forster	1st Baron Forster	
John Baird	1st Baron Stonehaven	1st Viscount Stonehaven	He was raised to the peerage after his appointment as governor-general was announced, but before taking up the office.
Prince Henry	1st Duke of Gloucester	1st Duke of Gloucester	Third son of King George V.
William Morrison	1st Viscount Dunrossil	(died in office)	
William Sidney	1st Viscount De L'Isle	1st Viscount De L'Isle	
Ronald Munro Ferguson	Sir Ronald Munro Ferguson	1st Viscount Novar	He was raised to the peerage as 1st Viscount Novar after leaving office. However, his peerage title contained no reference to any Australian place.

In addition to the above, some Governors of the Australian states (colonies prior to Federation) were peers prior to their appointment.

== Australian life peers ==
Some Australians have been made life peers (barons) or peeresses (baronesses) of the United Kingdom. They include:

- James Atkin (1867–1944), born in Brisbane. He served as a judge of the King's Bench division of the High Court of England and Wales, and in 1928 was appointed a law lord. He took the title of Baron Atkin, of Aberdovey, in the County of Merioneth.
- Natalie Bennett (born 1966), Green Party of England and Wales politician; born in Eastwood, New South Wales, raised, educated and spent her early career in journalism in Australia, relocated to England in 1999. Bennett was made a life peer in 2019, as Baroness Bennett of Manor Castle, of Camden in the London Borough of Camden.
- Sir Michael Bishop (born 1942), English-born Australian businessman, was made a life peer in 2011. He took the name Baron Glendonbrook, of Bowdenn in the County of Cheshire.
- Sir Alec Broers (born 1938), former Vice-Chancellor of Cambridge University, former president of the Royal Academy of Engineering, was ennobled in 2004. His title as a life peer is Baron Broers, of Cambridge in the County of Cambridgeshire.
- Richard Casey (1890–1976), resigned from the Australian Federal Parliament in 1960 to accept a life peerage. He became Baron Casey, of Berwick in the State of Victoria and the Commonwealth of Australia, and of the City of Westminster, and he took his seat in the House of Lords. In 1965 he was made Governor-General of Australia.
- Robin Corbett (1933–2012), British Labour Party politician; born in Fremantle, Western Australia, but moved to England as a small child. Corbett was made a life peer in 2001, as Baron Corbett of Castle Vale, of Erdington in the County of West Midlands.
- Sir Howard Florey (1898–1968) was made a life peer in 1965 as Baron Florey, of Adelaide in the State of South Australia and Commonwealth of Australia and of Marston in the County of Oxford. Both Florey and the discoverer of penicillin, Sir Alexander Fleming, were knighted in 1944. Florey's additional peerage recognised the monumental work he did in making penicillin available in sufficient quantities to save millions of lives in World War II.
- Trixie Gardner (1927–2024), dentist and Conservative politician, was made a life peeress as Baroness Gardner of Parkes in the State of New South Wales and Commonwealth of Australia, and of Southgate in Greater London, on 19 June 1981. She was the last recipient of a peerage with reference to a place in Australia.
- Robert Hall (1901–1988), Australian-born economic adviser to the UK government (1953–61) and a member of Britain's Economic Planning Board (1947–61), was made a life peer in 1969. He took the name Baron Roberthall, of Silverspur in the State of Queensland and Commonwealth of Australia and of Trenance in the County of Cornwall.
- Sir Michael Hintze (born 1953), businessman and philanthropist; born in Harbin, Heilongjiang, China, was raised and educated in Sydney, and currently resides in England. Hintze was made a life peer in 2022 as Baron Hintze, of Dunster in the County of Somerset.
- Sir Robert May (1936–2020), chief scientific adviser to HM Government, president of the Royal Society, and a professor at Sydney, Princeton, Oxford, and Imperial College London, was made a life peer in 2001. After his initial preference for "Baron May of Woollahra" failed after objection from the Protocol Office of the Australian Prime Minister's Department, he chose the title Baron May of Oxford, of Oxford in the County of Oxfordshire.
- Augustus Uthwatt (1879–1949), Australian-born judge; Judge of the Chancery Division of the High Court of Justice; Lord of Appeal in Ordinary; Privy Counsellor; 1946 he took the title Baron Uthwatt, of Lathbury, in the County of Buckingham.

== Abortive peerages ==
The following Australians were nominated for peerages, but the peerage was never actually bestowed.

- Sir John Forrest was to have been made an hereditary peer, but died before the peerage was formally created. He was an explorer and statesman, who became the first Premier of Western Australia (1890–1901). After Federation he entered Federal Parliament (1901–1918). On 6 February 1918, he was informed that he was to be elevated to the British peerage as Baron Forrest, of Bunbury in the Commonwealth of Australia and of Forrest in Fife, and a public announcement was made of the honour. He died at sea off the coast of Sierra Leone while en route to England for medical treatment. Despite the announcement, no Letters Patent were issued before his death, so the peerage was not officially created. He is sometimes referred to as "Lord Forrest", however this is an inaccurate title. He died childless, and so the barony would have become extinct upon his death even if he had survived to receive it.
- D. P. O'Connell was nominated for a life peerage in the 1979 UK Honours List but died before the peerage could be granted.
- In 1977, the prime minister Malcolm Fraser at least informally raised with the UK prime minister James Callaghan the prospect of the governor-general Sir John Kerr being elevated to the peerage. This was done at the same time as recommending Kerr's appointment as a Privy Counsellor. Callaghan supported the latter recommendation, but felt unable to support the former.

== Australian baronets ==
The following Australians were awarded or have inherited baronetcies:

=== Baronetcy of Barnewall of Crickstown ===
The baronetcy is extant. John Aylmer Barnewall emigrated to Australia in 1840. He died at Upper Thornton, Victoria in 1890. In 1909, his son John Robert Barnewall succeeded to the baronetcy as 11th baronet. The 13th baronet, Sir Reginald Robert Barnewall, was born in 1924 and educated at Xavier College, Melbourne. He succeeded to the baronetcy in 1961 and lived in Mount Tamborine, Queensland until his death in 2018. His son Sir Peter Barnewall (born 1963) is the 14th and current baronet.

=== Baronetcy of Boileau ===
Boileau baronets have resided in Australia since 1942, when Francis Boileau became the 5th baronet. The current holder is the 9th baronet.

=== Baronetcy of Clarke of Rupertswood ===
Sir William John Clarke, 1st Bt. (1882, Colony of Victoria)

The baronetcy is extant. The 4th and current Baronet, Sir Rupert Grant Alexander Clarke (born 1947), lives in Victoria.

=== Baronetcy of Cooper of Woollahra ===
Sir Daniel Cooper, 1st Bt. (1863, Colony of New South Wales)

The baronetcy is extant. Currently held by Sir William Cooper, 6th Bt.

=== Baronetcy of Henry of Parkwood ===
Sir Charles Solomon Henry, 1st Bt. (1860–1919), was an Australian merchant and businessman who lived mostly in Britain and sat as a Liberal Member of Parliament (MP) in the House of Commons from 1906 until his death. He had no heirs.

The baronetcy is extinct.

=== Baronetcy of Lauder of Fountainhall, Haddingtonshire ===
Sir Piers Robert Dick Lauder, 13th Baronet, born 3 October 1947 at Nicosia, Cyprus, where his father was an officer serving in the British Army. From 1974 until 2006, Lauder (who only uses the surname Lauder) was a programmer and Computer Systems Officer in the Basser Department of Computer Science at Sydney University. His main interests are in the areas of networking and operating systems. With Judy Kay he co-authored the Fair Share Scheduler, now being sold by Aurema under the name "ARMTechShareExpress". With Professor Robert (Bob) Kummerfeld he co-authored the Message Handling Systems network ("MHSnet") used, among others, by the Australian Department of Foreign Affairs and Trade. Professor Kummerfeld and Piers Lauder were jointly elected to the Australian Internet Hall of Fame in 1998. Sir Piers Lauder is a founding member of AUUG, the Australian Unix and Open Systems User Group. He has twice been appointed Programme Chairman at AUUG Conferences in Sydney and has taken leave from the university to work overseas on three separate occasions, twice at the invitation of Bell Laboratories to work in the lab that originated UNIX, and once at the invitation of UUNET to work in the burgeoning ISP business. He is an enthusiastic proponent of the Python programming language. He has, by his partner Jane Elix, a natural child, Angus Thomas Lauder Elix (born 1996). They also have a foster-daughter, Akira Crease. The heir presumptive to the baronetcy is Mark Andrew Dick Lauder (born 1951), second and youngest son of the 12th Baronet. He was born in Berlin at the British Military Hospital. His heir apparent is his only son, Martin Dick-Lauder (born 1976).

=== Baronetcy of Matheson of Lochalsh ===
Sir Alexander Matheson, 3rd Baronet (6 February 1861 – 7 August 1929), born in Mayfair, London, was the son of Sir Alexander Matheson, 1st Baronet, a Scottish member of the House of Commons. In 1894 he migrated to Western Australia. In 1897, he was elected to the Western Australian Legislative Council for North-East Province, serving until 1901. In 1901 he was elected to the Australian Senate as a Senator for Western Australia, on a platform of absolute free trade, industrial arbitration, old age pensions, uniform franchise and White Australia. He served until his retirement in 1906. Returning to England, he succeeded to the Matheson baronetcy in 1920, and died in 1929.

=== Baronetcy of Nicholson of Luddenham ===
Sir Charles Nicholson, 1st Bt. (1859, Colony of New South Wales)

The baronetcy is extinct.

=== Baronetcy of O'Loghlen of Drumcanora ===
- Sir Bryan O'Loghlen, 3rd Baronet (1828-1905), emigrated to Victoria in 1862 was appointed a Crown Prosecutor in 1863. He succeeded to the baronetcy on the death of his elder brother in 1877. He held a seat in the Victorian Legislative Assembly from 1878 to 1883, and was Premier of Victoria from 1881 until 1883. He rejoined the Legislative Assembly in 1888, holding a seat until 1900.
- Sir Colman Michael O'Loghlen, 6th Baronet (1916–2014), was educated at Xavier College, Melbourne and succeeded to the baronetcy in 1951.
- Michael O'Loghlen, Q.C., is the son of the 6th baronet and is the prospective 7th baronet following his father's death.

=== Baronetcy of Samuel of Nevern Square ===
- Sir Saul Samuel, 1st Baronet (1820–1900)
- Sir Edward Levien Samuel, 2nd Baronet (1868–1937)
- Sir Edward Louis Samuel, 3rd Baronet (1896–1961)
- Sir John Oliver Cecil Samuel, 4th Baronet (1916–1962)
- Sir John Michael Glen Samuel, 5th Baronet (born 1944)

=== Baronetcy of Trollope of Casewick ===
- Sir Gordon Clavering Trollope, 15th Baronet (29 October 1885 – 18 October 1958), was born in Sydney and attended Newington College (1898–1901). He later worked as a woolbroker in Australia.
- Sir Anthony Owen Clavering Trollope, 16th Baronet (15 January 1917 – 1987), elder son of the 15th Baronet, was born in Sydney and attended North Sydney Boys High School.
- Sir Anthony Simon Trollope, 17th Baronet (born 31 August 1945) was born in Sydney and attended North Sydney Boys High. He is married, with two daughters.
- The heir presumptive to the baronetcy is Hugh Irwin Trollope (b. 31 March 1947), who is married with one son and two daughters. Hugh Trollope was born in Sydney and attended North Sydney Boys High School. As a result of a family illness he became a boarder at Newington College (1964–1966), which his grandfather had attended. He was a notable Rugby Union player for Newington and Gordon Club.

=== Baronetcy of Way of Montefiore ===
Sir Samuel James Way, 1st Bt. (1836-1916; baronetcy awarded 1899, Colony of South Australia)

The baronetcy is extinct.

== See also ==
- Australian honorifics
- Bunyip aristocracy

== Bibliography ==
- Rubinstein, W.D. (1991). The Biographical Dictionary of Life Peers. New York: St Martin's Press. ISBN 0-312-01911-4.
- Cox, N. (1997). "The British Peerage: The Legal Standing of the Peerage and Baronetage in the overseas realms of the Crown with particular reference to New Zealand." New Zealand Universities Law Review. (Vol. 17, no. 4, pp. 379-401).
- Farnborough, T. E. May, 1st Baron. (1896). Constitutional History of England since the Accession of George the Third, 11th ed. London: Longmans, Green and Co.
- Life Peerages Act 1958. (6 & 7 Elizabeth 2 c. 21). London: Her Majesty's Stationery Office.
