= Countess of Loudoun =

Countess of Loudoun is the title which may be held by a woman in her own right or given to the wife of the Earl of Loudoun. Women who have held the title include:

== Countesses in their own right ==
- Flora Mure-Campbell, Marchioness of Hastings (6th Countess of Loudoun; 1780-1840)
- Edith Rawdon-Hastings, 10th Countess of Loudoun (1833-1874)
- Edith Abney-Hastings, 12th Countess of Loudoun (1883-1960)
- Barbara Abney-Hastings, 13th Countess of Loudoun (1919-2002)

== As wife of the Earl of Loudoun ==
- Barbara Rawdon-Hastings, Marchioness of Hastings (1810-1858)

== Other ==
- Countess of Loudoun (ship)
