= Simon Abney-Hastings, 15th Earl of Loudoun =

Australian member of the British peerage

The Right Honourable The Earl of Loudoun
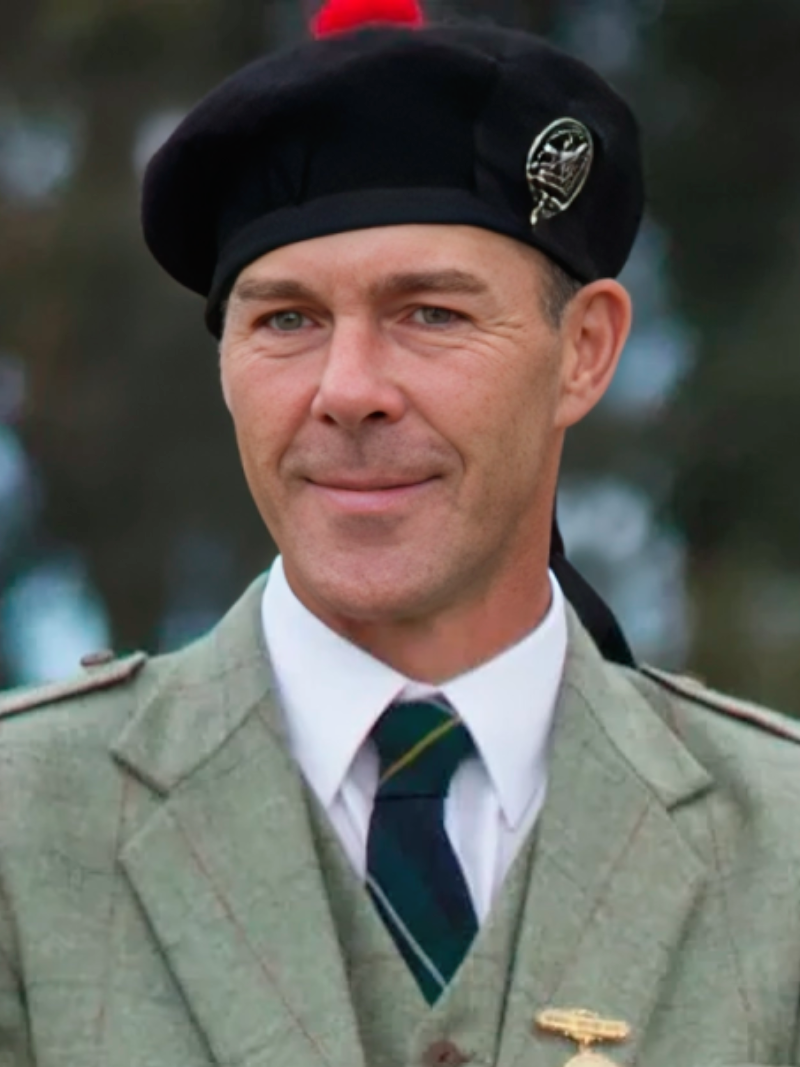
- The Earl of Loudoun in 2023
- Tenure: 2012–present
- Predecessor: Michael Abney-Hastings, 14th Earl of Loudoun
- Born: Simon Michael Rawdon Francis Abney-Hastings; 29 October 1974 (age 52)
- Locality: Wangaratta, Victoria
- Heir: The Hon. Marcus Abney-Hastings
- Parents: Michael Abney-Hastings, 14th Earl of Loudoun

Simon Michael Abney-Hastings, 15th Earl of Loudoun (born 29 October 1974), styled as Lord Mauchline until 2012, is a British peer living in Australia.

== Family and activities ==
Lord Loudoun is the son of Michael Abney-Hastings, 14th Earl of Loudoun, whom he succeeded in 2012. He resides in Wangaratta, Victoria.

The heir presumptive to the title is his younger brother, the Hon. Marcus William Abney-Hastings (born 1981).

Loudoun was chosen to carry one of the gold spurs of the royal regalia, emblems of knighthood and chivalry to be presented to King Charles III at his coronation. He is the only Australian to have played an official role in the coronation. In a statement provided to some media outlets, his private secretary Terence Guthridge said Loudoun was "delighted" to be asked to bear the large golden spurs, part of the ceremony dating back to the coronation of Richard the Lionheart in 1189. He is also a Catholic and advocates for the canonization of his ancestor, Margaret Pole, Countess of Salisbury.

=== Patronage and honours ===
- Hereditary Governor – Patron – Repton School, Derbyshire
- Patron – Ashby de la Zouch Museum
- Patron – Friends of Loudoun Kirk
- President – The Board of Governors, St Andrew's First Aid Australia
- Patron – Melbourne Highland Games, Australia (formally Ringwood Highland Games)
- Patron – Clan Campbell Society of Australia
- Patron – Barnet 1471 Battlefields Society
- Protector – Order of St Thomas of Acre
- Kentucky Colonel (2022) – Highest Honor awarded by the Commonwealth of Kentucky, USA
- Esteemed friend of Loudoun Museum, Leesburg, Loudoun County, Virginia, United States
- Chieftain of the Day 2022 – Brigadoon Highland Games – Bundanoon NSW
- Chieftain of the Day 2023 – Aberdeen Highland Games

== Ancestry and the royal succession ==
Through his grandmother Barbara Abney-Hastings, 13th Countess of Loudoun, he is descended from, and heir-general of, George Plantagenet, 1st Duke of Clarence, brother of Edward IV and Richard III.

In 2004, the documentary Britain's Real Monarch repeated the claim that his father the 14th Earl, as the senior descendant of the Duke of Clarence, was the rightful King of England. This argument hinges on the claim that Edward IV was illegitimate. This claim (were it valid) would have passed to Loudoun on his father's death. Loudoun has recognised the claim but has stated he is a loyal supporter of the late Queen Elizabeth II and the current monarch King Charles III. He was invited to the coronation of King Charles III, notwithstanding the competing claim being occasionally discussed by some media sources.

Peerage of Scotland
| Preceded by Michael Abney-Hastings | Earl of Loudoun; 2012–present | Incumbent |
