= List of shipwrecks in August 1854 =

The list of shipwrecks in August 1854 includes ships sunk, foundered, wrecked, grounded, or otherwise lost during August 1854.

== 1 August ==
List of shipwrecks: 1 August 1854
Ship	State	Description
Telegraph	United Kingdom	The steamship ran aground near the "Yarmoyle Lighthouse". She was on a voyage from Liverpool, Lancashire to Belfast, County Antrim. She had been refloated by 7 August.

== 2 August ==
List of shipwrecks: 2 August 1854
Ship	State	Description
Rob Roy	United Kingdom	The clipper ship was wrecked in the Andaman Islands. Some of those on board took to a boat and were rescued four days later. Forty-two survivors were subsequently rescued by the steamship Nemesis ( India).
Twee Gebroeders	Hamburg	The ship foundered in the North Sea. Her crew were rescued by Maria (United Kingdom). Twee Gebroeders was on a voyage from London, United Kingdom to Harburg.

== 3 August ==
List of shipwrecks: 3 August 1854
Ship	State	Description
Flying Dragon	United Kingdom	The ship caught fire in Simon's Bay. She was scuttled by HMS Hydra (Royal Navy). Flying Dragon was on a voyage from Colombo, Ceylon to London.
Hannibal	United Kingdom	The full-rigged ship was wrecked on a reef off New Caledonia. All on board were rescued by Constantine (French Navy). Hannibal was on a voyage from Sydney, New South Wales to Hong Kong.

== 4 August ==
List of shipwrecks: 4 August 1854
Ship	State	Description
Alarm	United Kingdom	The schooner departed from Tampico, Mexico for Laguna. No further trace, presumed foundered with the loss of all hands.
Myrtle	United Kingdom	The paddle steamer ran aground off Sanda Island and was wrecked. She was on a voyage from Glasgow, Renfrewshire to Londonderry.
Shandon	United Kingdom	The ship was destroyed by fire in the Atlantic Ocean. All on board were rescued by Albion, Calcutta, Countess of Loudoun and Glencairn (all United Kingdom). Shandon was on a voyage from the Clyde to Montreal and Quebec City Province of Canada, British North America.
Sonne	Prussia	The ship was lost whilst on a voyage from Memel to Liverpool, Lancashire, United Kingdom. Her crew were rescued.

== 5 August ==
List of shipwrecks: 5 August 1854
Ship	State	Description
St. Agnes	United Kingdom	The schooner struck the Willies Rocks and sank. Her crew were rescued. She was on a voyage from Newport, Monmouthshire to St. Ives, Cornwall.

== 6 August ==
List of shipwrecks: 6 August 1854
Ship	State	Description
Navarino	United Kingdom	The dandy sank off Beachy Head, Sussex.

== 7 August ==
List of shipwrecks: 7 August 1854
Ship	State	Description
Sarah Sands	United Kingdom	The ship capsized at Liverpool, Lancashire.

== 8 August ==
List of shipwrecks: 8 August 1854
Ship	State	Description
Harriet	(United Kingdom of Great Britain and Ireland) Jamaica	The sloop was lost in Montego Bay.
Her Majesty	United Kingdom	The paddle steamer departed from Cork for Quebec City, Province of Canada, British North America. Last sighted 400 nautical miles (740 km) off Cork, presumed subsequently foundered with the loss of all 20 crew.
HMS Penelope	Royal Navy	Crimean War: The Leda-class frigate ran aground in Åland, Grand Duchy of Finland. She was refloated.
Robina Mitchell	United Kingdom	The ship was driven ashore at Fort Point, Calcutta, India. She was refloated and taken in to Calcutta for repairs.

== 9 August ==
List of shipwrecks: 9 August 1854
Ship	State	Description
Stag	United Kingdom	The ship ran aground on the Newcombe Sand, in the North Sea off the coast of Suffolk. She was refloated and put in to Wells-next-the-Sea, Norfolk in a leaky condition.

== 10 August ==
List of shipwrecks: 10 August 1854
Ship	State	Description
Bertha Maria	United Kingdom	The ship was wrecked at Arkhangelsk, Russia. Her crew were rescued. She was on a voyage from Cork to Arkhangelsk.
Fatahool Ruchman	Flag unknown	The ship was wrecked on the Pulo Kramean Reef. Her crew were rescued. She was on a voyage from Surabaya, Spanish East Indies to "Banjevmaping".
Laurie	United Kingdom	The ship ran aground in the River Lagan. She was on a voyage from Morecambe, Lancashire to Belfast, County Antrim. she was refloated but found to be severely leak and was beached.

== 12 August ==
List of shipwrecks: 12 August 1854
Ship	State	Description
Mohongo	United States	The ship ran aground in the River Foyle. She was on a voyage from Londonderry, United Kingdom to Philadelphia, Pennsylvania.
St. Hilda	United Kingdom	The ship ran aground off Helsingør, Denmark.

== 13 August ==
List of shipwrecks: 13 August 1854
Ship	State	Description
Sundsvall	Sweden	The steamship ran aground in Åland, Grand Duchy of Finland. She was refloated the next day with assistance from Vengeance (French Navy).

== 15 August ==
List of shipwrecks: 15 August 1854
Ship	State	Description
Atlantique	France	The ship was lost in the Mellacorée River. She was on a voyage from the Mellacorée River to Marseille, Bouches-du-Rhône.
St. Thomas	United States	The ship was wrecked on the Sardanillos Reef. Her crew survived. She was on a voyage from Manzanilla, Trinidad to Liverpool, Lancashire, United Kingdom.

== 16 August ==
List of shipwrecks: 16 August 1854
Ship	State	Description
Ann	Kingdom of Hanover	The tjalk ran aground at Norden.
Sea Witch	United States	The ship was severely damaged at Valparaíso, Chile.

== 17 August ==
List of shipwrecks: 17 August 1854
Ship	State	Description
Irene	United Kingdom	The ship departed from Rio de Janeiro, Brazil for and English port. No further trace, presumed foundered with the loss of all hands.
Jupiter	United Kingdom	The steamship collided with the steamship Swanland (United Kingdom) and sank in the Humber. Jupiter was refloated on 7 September and beached.
Maranham	United Kingdom	The ship was driven ashore at Fleetwood, Lancashire. She was on a voyage from Quebec City, Province of Canada, British North America to Fleetwood.

== 18 August ==
List of shipwrecks: 18 August 1854
Ship	State	Description
Germania	Bremen	The ship sprang a leak and was beached at Bremerhaven. She was on a voyage from was Bremerhaven to New York, United States.

== 19 August ==
List of shipwrecks: 19 August 1854
Ship	State	Description
George and Elizabeth	United Kingdom	The schooner was in collision with the steamship Clyde (United Kingdom) and sank in the Thames Estuary. Her crew were rescued by Clyde. George and Elizabeth was on a voyage from West Hartlepool, County Durham to Milton Regis, Kent.

== 20 August ==
List of shipwrecks: 20 August 1854
Ship	State	Description
Enterprise	United Kingdom	The ship sprang a leak and foundered in the Mediterranean Sea off Cape San Marco, Sardinia. Her crew were rescued by the barque Industry (Sweden). Enterprise was on a voyage from Malta to Agrigento, Sicily.
John Cockrell	France	The ship ran aground at Saint Domingo. She was on a voyage from Saint Thomas, Virgin Islands to Saint Domingo. She was refloated and found to be severely damaged.
Matilda Cornelia	Netherlands	The ship ran aground on the Longsand, in the North Sea off the coast of Essex, United Kingdom. She was on a voyage from Amsterdam, North Holland to Cardiff, Glamorgan, United Kingdom. She was refloated and taken in to Harwich, Essex in a leaky condition.

== 21 August ==
List of shipwrecks: 21 August 1854
Ship	State	Description
Admiraal Graf von Heiden	Netherlands	The schooner was driven ashore and wrecked at Harboøre, Denmark. Her crew were rescued. She was on a voyage from Gloucester, United Kingdom to Königsberg, Prussia.
Martha	United Kingdom	The sloop was abandoned off Freswick, Caithness. Her crew were rescued by the smack Ariel (United Kingdom). Martha was on a voyage from Aberdeen to Burntisland, Fife. She was subsequently driven ashore in Sinclair Bay.
Mary Coward	United Kingdom	The ship was damaged by fire at Memel, Prussia.
Tusket	United Kingdom	The brig was driven ashore on Moscow Island, in Chaleur Bay. She was on a voyage from Bathurst, New Brunswick, British North America to the Clyde. She was consequently condemned.

== 23 August ==
List of shipwrecks: 23 August 1854
Ship	State	Description
Carleton	United Kingdom	The ship was driven ashore on Prince Edward Island, British North America. Her crew were rescued. She was on a voyage from Prince Edward Island to an English port.
Caroline Louisa	United Kingdom	The ship was driven ashore at Port Talbot, Glamorgan.
John Watson	United Kingdom	The brigantine ran aground on the Bramble Bank, in the Solent. She was on a voyage from Sunderland, County Durham to Southampton, Hampshire. She was later refloated and taken in to Southampton.
Susan	United Kingdom	The smack was driven ashore at Port Talbot.
Woodville	United Kingdom	The schooner ran aground off the Dragør Lightship (Denmark). She was on a voyage from Memel, Prussia to London. She was refloated and resumed her voyage.

== 24 August ==
List of shipwrecks: 24 August 1854
Ship	State	Description
Anton Paulsen	Norway	The ship was driven ashore and severely damaged on Inchcolm, Fife, United Kingdom. She was on a voyage from Dram to Grangemouth, Stirlingshire, United Kingdom. She was later refloated and towed in to Grangemouth.
Friendship	United Kingdom	The ship was driven ashore at Dungeness, Kent. She was on a voyage from Sunderland, County Durham to Littlehampton, Sussex. She was refloated and put in to Dover, Kent in a leaky condition.
Gotthelff	Stettin	The ship was abandoned in the Baltic Sea off Marstrand, Sweden. She was on a voyage from Stettin to Hartlepool County Durham, United Kingdom.
Prestatyn	United Kingdom	The sloop was in collision with Marie Louise (United Kingdom) and was beached at Connah's Quay, Flintshire.

== 25 August ==
List of shipwrecks: 25 August 1854
Ship	State	Description
Ann	United Kingdom	The ship foundered in the North Sea. Her crew were rescued by Royal Union (United Kingdom). Ann was on a voyage from Newcastle upon Tyne, Northumberland to Schiedam, South Holland, Netherlands.
Appoline	United Kingdom	The ship was wrecked 10 nautical miles (19 km) west of Baracoa, Cuba. Her crew were rescued.
HMS Assistance	Royal Navy	HMS Assistance. The icebound barque was abandoned off Bathurst Island, Province of Canada, British North America.
Danish Kiel	United Kingdom	The schooner ran aground on the Goodwin Sands, Kent. She was on a voyage from Messina, Sicily to Hull, Yorkshire. She was refloated and taken in to Ramsgate, Kent.
Georges	France	The ship ran aground on the Newcombe Sand, in the North Sea off the coast of Suffolk, United Kingdom.
John Francis	United Kingdom	The ship was abandoned in the Atlantic Ocean. Her crew were rescued by Repeater (United Kingdom). John Francis was on a voyage from Quebec City, Province of Canada to Liverpool, Lancashire.
Kate Robertson	United Kingdom	The ship was driven ashore at Putzig, Prussia. She was on a voyage from Danzig to London. She was refloated the next day and resumed her voyage.

== 26 August ==
List of shipwrecks: 26 August 1854
Ship	State	Description
Amelia Thompson	United Kingdom	The ship was driven ashore in St. Simon's Bay. She was on a voyage from London to San Francisco, California, United States.
Jordeson	United Kingdom	The brig was abandoned in the Atlantic Ocean. All on board were rescued by New York Packet (United States). Jordeson was on a voyage from South Shields, County Durham to New York, United States.

== 28 August ==
List of shipwrecks: 28 August 1854
Ship	State	Description
Lucie	Grand Duchy of Oldenburg	The steamship ran aground on the Nash Sands, off the coast of Glamorgan, United Kingdom and sank. Her crew were rescued. She was on a voyage from Cardiff, Glamorgan to Bremen.
Rachel	(United Kingdom of Great Britain and Ireland) Cape Colony	The schooner was driven ashore and wrecked in Hondeklip Bay.

== 29 August ==
List of shipwrecks: 29 August 1854
Ship	State	Description
Esperance	Hamburg	The ship ran aground on the Gilbsand. She was on a voyage from Altona to "Hoyer". She was refloated.
Minerva	United Kingdom	The paddle steamer struck the Coal Rock, off The Skerries, Anglesey and sank. All on board took to five boats. Those in three of the boats were rescued by Mail (United Kingdom); the remainder also survived. Those in one boat were rescued by a smack, the others reaching Cemaes Bay safely. Minerva was on a voyage from Liverpool, Lancashire to Cork.
Pioneer	United States	The full-rigged ship ran aground on the Newcombe Sand, in the North Sea off the coast of Suffolk, United Kingdom. She was refloated and resumed her voyage.

== 30 August ==
List of shipwrecks: 30 August 1854
Ship	State	Description
Adriana Petronella	Kingdom of Hanover	The ship was driven ashore. She was on a voyage from Sydney, New South Wales to Batavia, Netherlands East Indies. She subsequently floated off and sank.
Why Not	United Kingdom	The schooner ran aground on the Goodwin Sands, Kent. She was refloated and put in to Dover, Kent.

== Unknown date ==
List of shipwrecks: Unknown date in August 1854
Ship	State	Description
A. L. Johnston	United Kingdom	The ship ran aground in the Torres Straits. Her crew were rescued by Port Wallace ( (United Kingdom of Great Britain and Ireland) British North America) and she was set afire.
China	United Kingdom	The ship was driven ashore and wrecked on Anticosti Island, Nova Scotia, British North America. Her crew survived. She was on a voyage from Cartagena, Spain to Quebec City, Province of Canada, British North America.
Christina	Chile	The barque sprang a leak and sank in the Pacific Ocean before 14 August. Her crew took to the boats. One boat with six crew members on board was reported missing. She was on a voyage from Valparaíso, Chile to an English port.
Courier	United Kingdom	The transport ship was wrecked at "Poro", Greece before 27 August.
Fortuna	United Kingdom	The ship was abandoned in the Atlantic Ocean before 12 August. She was on a voyage from Tatamagouche, Nova Scotia to Liverpool, Lancashire.
Frances Nesham	United Kingdom	The ship ran aground on the Droogden, in the Baltic Sea. She was on a voyage from Stettin to and English port. She was refloated and put in to Helsingør, Denmark on 29 August for repairs.
Henry and Elizabeth	United Kingdom	The ship sprang a leak and was beached at Hela, Prussia. She was on a voyage from Danzig to London. She was refloated and put back to Danzig, where she arrived on 27 August.
Joseph, and Sarah	France; United Kingdom	Joseph was wrecked on the Red Bank, off Bathurst, Gambia Colony and Protectorate before 12 August. She was on a voyage from Bathurst to Marseille, Bouches-du-Rhône. The brigantine Sarah was wrecked going to the assistance of Joseph.
Juno	United Kingdom	The ship was abandoned in the North Sea before 29 August.
Maria Sophia	Belgium	The ship was in collision with another vessel and sank before 5 August.
Medora	(United Kingdom of Great Britain and Ireland) New South Wales	The brig caught fire in the Tamar River, Van Diemen's Land before 4 August and was scuttled. She was on a voyage from Newcastle to Launceston, Van Diemen's Land. She had been refloated by 26 September.
Nimrod	United Kingdom	The transport ship ran aground in the Baltic Sea.
Pilgrim	United Kingdom	The ship was abandoned off Cape Horn, Chile. Her crew were rescued by Doris (United Kingdom). She was on a voyage from Callao, Peru to Queenstown, County Cork.
Sarah	United Kingdom	The ship ran aground and was damaged on the Herd Sand, in the North Sea off the coast of County Durham. She was on a voyage from North Shields, County Durham to Alexandria, Egypt. She was refloated on 3 August.
