= Australian honorifics =

Forms of address used in the Commonwealth of Australia are given below.

== Forms of Address ==
Position	On envelopes	Salutation in letter	Oral address
King	HM The King	"Your Majesty"	"Your Majesty", and thereafter as "Sir"
Queen	HM The Queen	"Your Majesty"	"Your Majesty", and thereafter as "Ma'am"
Governor-General	His/Her Excellency the Honourable, Governor-General e.g. His Excellency General the Honourable David Hurley, Governor-General of the Commonwealth of Australia	"Your Excellency" or "Dear Governor-General"	"Your Excellency", and thereafter as "Sir/Ma'am"
Wife of the Governor-General	Her Excellency e.g. Her Excellency Mrs Hurley	"Your Excellency" or "Dear [Title][Surname]" e.g. Dear Mrs Hurley	"Your Excellency", and thereafter as "Ma'am" or "[Title][Surname]"
Australian Governors	His/Her Excellency	"Your Excellency"	"Your Excellency", and thereafter as "Sir/Ma'am"
Administrators of Australian territories	His/Her Honour	"Your Honour"	"Your Honour" and thereafter as "Sir/Ma'am"
Australian dukes and duchesses	His Grace the Duke of [peerage] e.g. His Grace the Duke of Manchester	"Your Grace"	"Your Grace" and thereafter as "Sir/Ma'am" or "Duke/Duchess"
Members of the nobility and titled commoners	His/Her Lordship/Ladyship e.g. His Lordship the Earl of Stradbroke e.g. Lady Elisa Dunmore in the case of a titled commoner	"My Lord/Lady"	"My Lord/Lady", and thereafter as "Sir/Ma'am"
Sons and daughters of Barons	The Honourable [name] e.g. Dr the Honourable Robert Bailieu	"Honourable"	"Sir/Ma'am"
Ministers of the Crown, judges, magistrates	The Honourable, [Ministerial title], His/Her Honour Judge [name]	"Honourable"	"Sir/Ma'am" in the case of a minister, "Your honour" in the case of a judge or magistrate
