= Rhodri Philipps, 4th Viscount St Davids =

British peer

Rhodri Colwyn Philipps, 4th Viscount St Davids (born 16 September 1966) is a British hereditary peer.

A businessman and company director, as of July 2017, Philipps had been declared bankrupt three times, had a criminal conviction for financial mismanagement and two further convictions for menacing communications, and was sentenced to 12 weeks in prison for one of the latter.

== Titles and family ==
He is the elder son and heir of British peer Colwyn Philipps, 3rd Viscount St Davids (d.2009), and Augusta Victoria Correay Larraín (a Chilean national, from Santiago).

Besides his viscountcy, which he inherited on the death of his father, he holds the older titles of Baron Strange of Knockin (1299), Baron Hungerford (1426), and Baron de Moleyns (1445), and the baronetcy of Picton Castle (1621). He is also a co-heir to the barony of Grey de Ruthyn.

Philipps is married to interior decorator Sarah Louise Butcher, who holds the title Lady St Davids. The heir presumptive to the viscountcy is his younger brother Roland. He was educated at Highgate School and Downside School.

He was also briefly enrolled at the University of Chicago.

== Legal problems ==
=== Financial matters ===
Philipps has received attention since at least the early 2000s, in relation to his business and legal affairs. He was first declared bankrupt in 2002, and subsequently held directorships in several companies. In September 2008, having been denied bail as a flight risk, Philipps spent more than a year in prison in Nuremberg while the German authorities investigated claims of the improper use of company funds. He was eventually given a two-year suspended prison sentence by a German court (Note: Landgericht Nürnberg-Fürth) for mismanagement of funds related to his construction company Hans Brochier, from which he transferred a seven-figure sum to a newly registered company in the UK in 2005. In 2009 he appealed against the sentence.

In September 2010, Philipps' West Sussex property, Strange Place, in Northchapel, was repossessed by Barclays Bank. In March 2011, he was declared bankrupt for a second time, and in November 2011 his wife, Viscountess St Davids, was sued for unpaid debts.

In March 2012, Philipps unsuccessfully sued offshore legal advisors Corporate & Chancery Group for £110 million in the Supreme Court of Mauritius, alleging fraud and mismanagement. In February 2016, he was declared bankrupt for a third time.

=== Menacing communications ===
Following a complaint made in November 2016, Philipps was arrested in January 2017 by Metropolitan Police officers investigating online abuse against a 51-year-old woman. In March 2017, he was charged with malicious communications with racially aggravated factors, over alleged threats against Gina Miller, who was behind a successful legal challenge against the UK government's intention to give notice to leave the European Union without an act of parliament. Among other communications, he posted on Facebook: "£5,000 for the first person to 'accidentally' run over this bloody troublesome first generation immigrant" and "If this is what we should expect from immigrants, send them back to their stinking jungles". He pleaded 'not guilty' to three charges of menacing communication under section 127 of the Communications Act 2003 when he appeared at Westminster Magistrates' Court on 2 May 2017.

At the May hearing, the prosecution said the crown would seek an extended sentence because of the racial aggravation factor. He was found guilty of two charges at his trial on 11 July 2017, at which he defended himself. Philipps was also convicted for comments made in response to a news article about an immigrant, in which he had written: "I will open the bidding. £2,000 in cash for the first person to carve Arnold Sube into pieces. Piece of shit". Philipps, who described his own comments as "satire", was sentenced to 12 weeks in prison. He was released on bail, pending an appeal. The appeal was abandoned by Philipps on 25 August 2017 some fifteen minutes after Judge Deborah Taylor informed Southwark Crown Court that there was a risk his sentence could be increased. Philipps was then required to serve the remainder of his original sentence.

== Arms ==
Coat of arms of Rhodri Philipps, 4th Viscount St Davids
Coronet A Coronet of a Viscount Crest A Lion as in the Arms Escutcheon Argent a Lion rampant Sable ducally gorged and chained Or langued and armed Gules Supporters Dexter: a Knight vested in chain armour the Jupon charged with the arms of Philipps and resting his exterior hand upon the Hilt of his Sword; Sinister: a Knight vested in plate armour his Jupon charged with the arms of Wogan (Or on a Chief Sable three Martlets of the field) and resting his exterior hand upon the Hilt of his Sword; both standing upon a Battlemented Wall all proper Motto Ducit Amor Patriae ("Patriotism Is My Motive")

== Notes and references ==
=== References ===
Peerage of the United Kingdom
Preceded by Colwyn Philipps	Viscount St Davids; 2009–present	Incumbent
