= Charles Rawdon-Hastings, 11th Earl of Loudoun =

Scottish peer

The Right Honourable The Earl of Loudoun DL
- Predecessor: Edith Rawdon-Hastings, 10th Countess of Loudoun
- Successor: Edith Abney-Hastings, 12th Countess of Loudoun
- Born: Charles Edward Abney-Hasting; 5 January 1855
- Died: 17 May 1920 (aged 65); Ashby-de-la-Zouch, North West Leicestershire
- Spouse: Hon. Alice Fitzalan-Howard (m. 1880; died 1915)
- Parents: Charles Abney-Hastings, 1st Baron Donington; Edith Rawdon-Hastings, 10th Countess of Loudoun

Charles Edward Rawdon-Hastings, 11th Earl of Loudoun DL (5 January 1855 – 17 May 1920) was a Scottish peer.

== Early life ==
At his birth on 5 January 1855, he was given the name Charles Edward Abney-Hastings. He was the eldest son of Charles Abney-Hastings, 1st Baron Donington and Edith Rawdon-Hastings, 10th Countess of Loudoun. His elder sister, Lady Flora Hastings married Henry Fitzalan-Howard, 15th Duke of Norfolk. Among his younger siblings were Hon. Paulyn Rawdon-Hastings (who married Lady Maud Grimston, daughter of James Grimston, 2nd Earl of Verulam), Gilbert Clifton-Hastings-Campbell, 3rd Baron Donington (who married Maud Kemble Hamilton, daughter of Sir Charles Hamilton, 1st Baronet).

== Career ==
On 23 January 1874, he succeeded his mother as 11th Earl of Loudoun as well as her subsidiary titles. On 8 April 1887 his name was legally changed to Charles Edward Rawdon-Hastings by Royal Licence. On 24 July 1895, he succeeded his father as 2nd Baron Donington.

He was a Lieutenant in the Leicestershire Yeomanry Cavalry and was Deputy Lieutenant of Ayrshire.

== Personal life ==
On 4 February 1880, he married the Hon. Alice Fitzalan-Howard (1856–1915) in London. Alice was the daughter of Edward Fitzalan-Howard, 1st Baron Howard of Glossop and, his first wife, Augusta Talbot (only daughter and heiress of Hon. George Henry Talbot, half-brother of John Talbot, 16th Earl of Shrewsbury). They had no children.

Lady Loudon died on 10 May 1915. Lord Loudon died at Ashby-de-la-Zouch in North West Leicestershire on 17 May 1920. On his death, his titles were divided between his nieces (the daughters of his brother Paulyn), and his younger brother, Gilbert.

Peerage of Scotland
Preceded by Edith Rawdon-Hastings	Earl of Loudoun; 1874–1920	Succeeded by Edith Abney-Hastings
Peerage of England
Preceded by Edith Rawdon-Hastings	Baron Botreaux; Baron Hastings (de Hastings); Baron Hastings (de Hungerford); 1874-1920	Vacant Title next held by Edith Abney-Hastings, 1921
Preceded by Edith Rawdon-Hastings	Baron Hungerford and de Moleyns; 1874-1920	Vacant Title next held by Elizabeth Philipps, 1921
Peerage of the United Kingdom
Preceded by Charles Abney-Hastings	Baron Donington; 1895-1920	Succeeded by Gilbert Clifton-Hastings-Campbell
