= Gilbert Clifton-Hastings-Campbell, 3rd Baron Donington =

The Right Honourable The Lord Donington

Personal details
- Born: Gilbert Theophilus Clifton Abney-Hastings; 29 May 1859
- Died: 31 May 1927 (aged 68) Eaton Square, London
- Spouse: Maud Kemble Hamilton (m. 1894)
- Relations: Charles Rawdon-Hastings, 11th Earl of Loudoun (brother)
- Children: 4
- Parent(s): Charles Abney-Hastings, 1st Baron Donington; Edith Rawdon-Hastings, 10th Countess of Loudoun

Military service
- Branch/service: British Army
- Rank: Major
- Unit: Sherwood Foresters

Gilbert Theophilus Clifton Clifton-Hastings-Campbell, 3rd Baron Donington (29 May 1859 – 31 May 1927) was a British peer and soldier.

== Early life ==
He was given the name Gilbert Theophilus Clifton Abney-Hastings at his birth on 29 May 1859. He was a younger son of Charles Abney-Hastings, 1st Baron Donington and Edith Rawdon-Hastings, 10th Countess of Loudoun. His elder siblings included Lady Flora Hastings (who married Henry Fitzalan-Howard, 15th Duke of Norfolk) and Charles Rawdon-Hastings, 11th Earl of Loudoun (who married Hon. Alice Fitzalan-Howard, daughter of Edward Fitzalan-Howard, 1st Baron Howard of Glossop). Among his younger siblings were Hon. Paulyn Rawdon-Hastings (who married Lady Maud Grimston, daughter of James Grimston, 2nd Earl of Verulam).

His maternal grandparents were George Rawdon-Hastings, 2nd Marquess of Hastings and Barbara Rawdon-Hastings, Marchioness of Hastings suo jure 20th Baroness Grey de Ruthyn.

== Career ==
On 2 January 1896, his name was legally changed to Gilbert Theophilus Clifton Clifton-Hastings-Campbell by Royal Licence. He was a major in the 3rd Battalion, Sherwood Foresters.

On 17 May 1920, upon the death of his elder brother, he succeeded as the 3rd Baron Donington, of Donington Park. The title had been created for his father in 1880 by Prime Minister Benjamin Disraeli because his father had been married to a suo jure peeress and his eldest son was an earl, but he was a commoner, so the "anomaly" was "redressed" with a peerage.

== Personal life ==
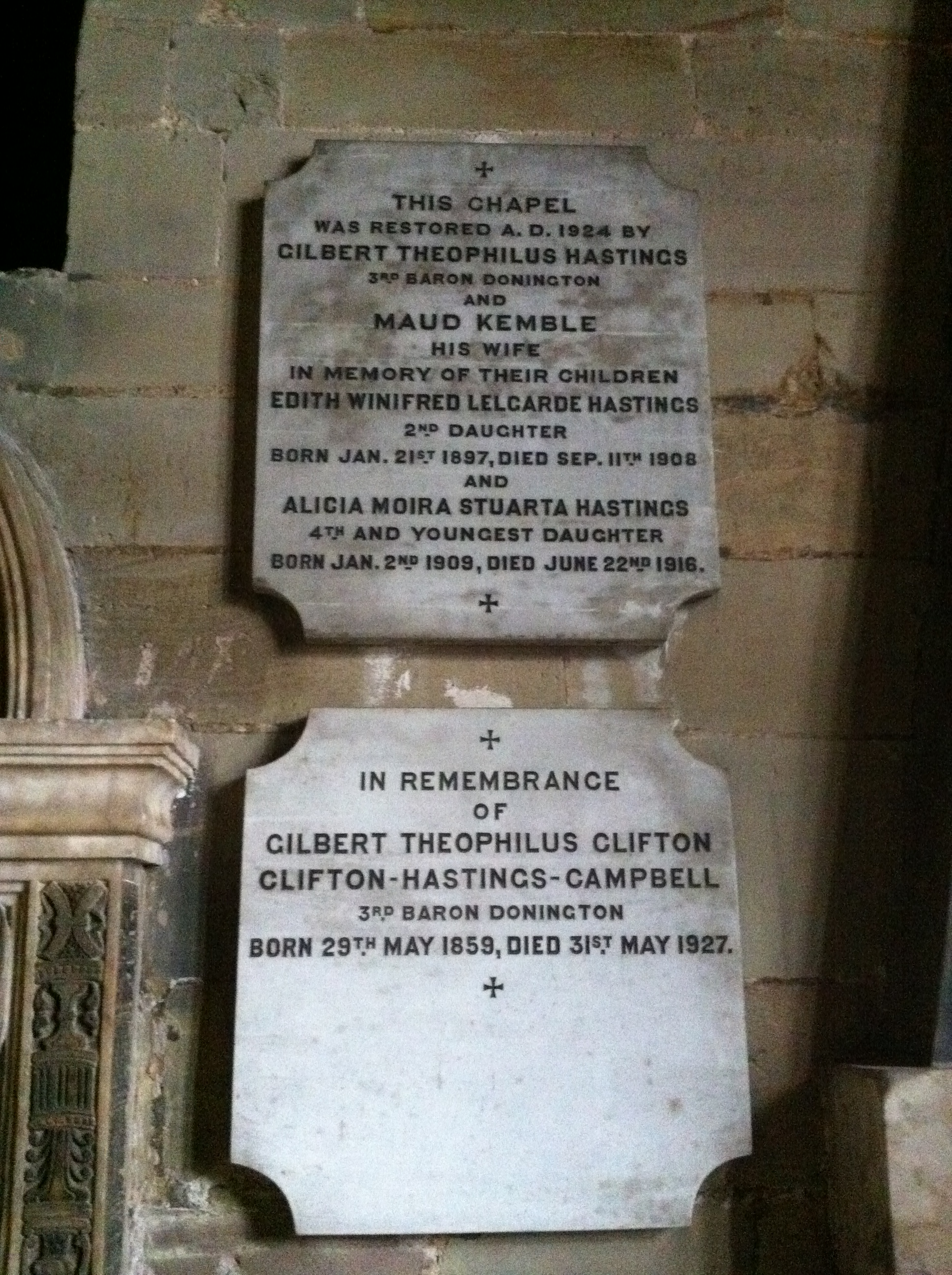
Wall plaques in St. Helen's Church, Ashby-de-la-Zouch

On 12 July 1894, he married Maud Kemble Hamilton, daughter of Sir Charles Hamilton, 1st Baronet, and the former Lucia McCorquodale. Together, they lived at Glenlee Park, New Galloway, Kirkcudbrightshire, Scotland, and Hatley Park, Hatley St. George, Sandy, Bedfordshire, and were the parents of four daughters, two of whom survived to adulthood:

- Hon. Margaret Selina Flora Maud Clifton-Hastings-Campbell (1895–1975), who married Sir Edward MacTaggart-Stewart, 2nd Baronet, son of Sir Mark John McTaggart-Stewart, 1st Baronet, in 1917.
- Edith Winifred Leigarde Clifton-Hastings-Campbell (1897–1908), who died young.
- Hon. Irene Mary Egidia Clifton-Hastings-Campbell (1898–1961), who married Lt.-Col. Richard St Barbe Emmott, in 1927.
- Alicia Moira Stuarta Clifton-Hastings-Campbell (1909–1916), who died young.

Lord Donington died on 31 May 1927 at 47 Eaton Square, his home in London. He was buried at Ashby Castle ruins. On his death, his barony became extinct. He left an estate of £71,266, the majority of which was left to his wife, and then upon her death, to his two surviving daughters. Lady Donington died on 18 November 1947.

=== Descendants ===
Through his eldest daughter Selina, he was a grandfather of Faith Agnes Devorguilla MacTaggart-Stewart (1926–1998), who married Henry John Brewis, MP for Galloway.

Through his daughter Irene, he was a grandfather of Patricia Egidia Hastings Emmott (1929–2020), who married Brigadier Stafford Floyer-Acland.

Peerage of the United Kingdom
Preceded by Charles Rawdon-Hastings	Baron Donington; 1920–1927	Extinct
