= Michael Abney-Hastings, 14th Earl of Loudoun =

Australian politician (1942–2012)

The Right Honourable The Earl of Loudoun
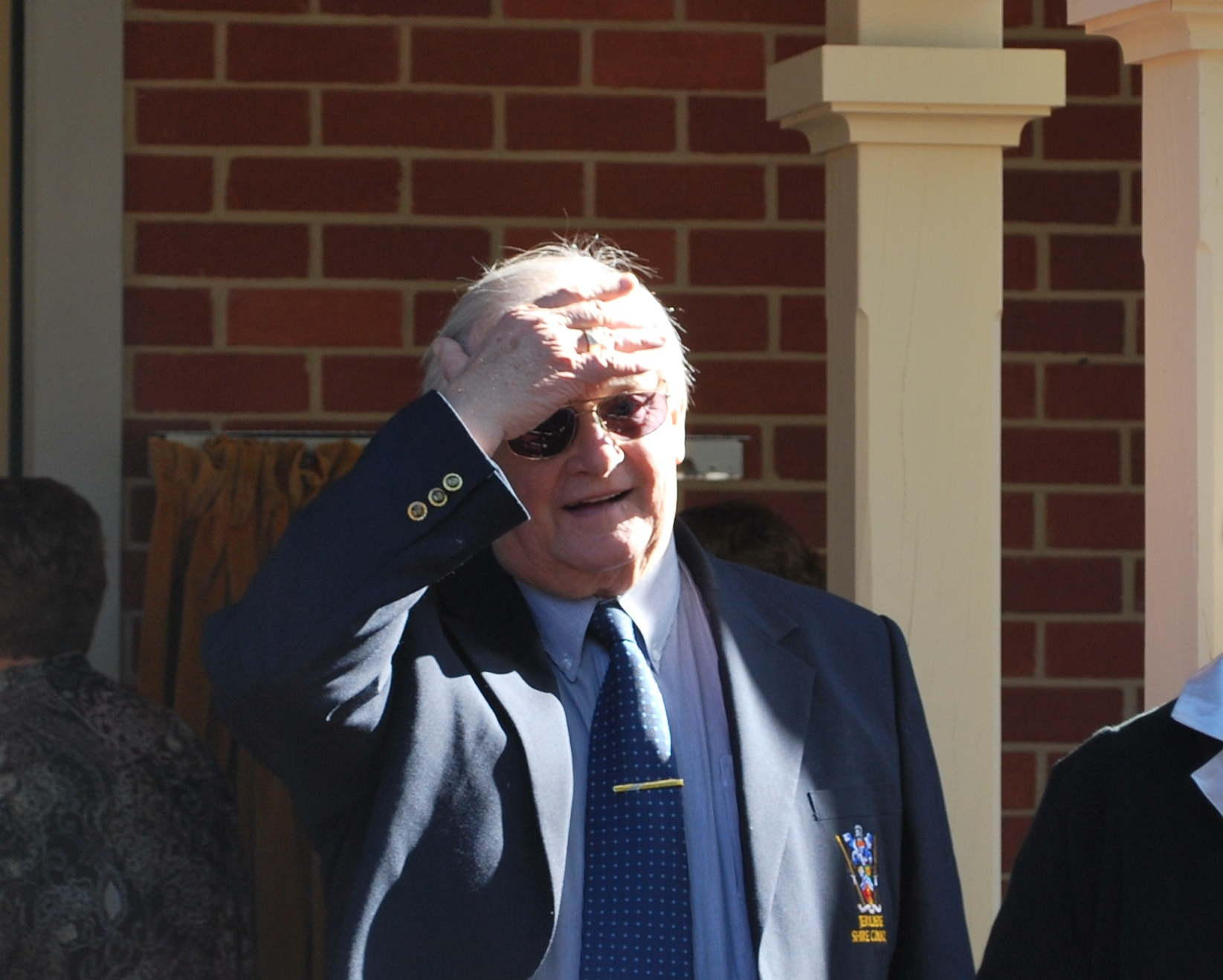
- Born: Michael Edward Lord; 22 July 1942; Sussex, England
- Died: 30 June 2012 (aged 69); Jerilderie, New South Wales, Australia
- Education: Ampleforth College
- Occupation: Farmer
- Title: Earl of Loudoun
- Spouse: Noelene McCormick (m. 1969)
- Children: 5, including Simon Abney-Hastings, 15th Earl of Loudoun
- Parents: Barbara Abney-Hastings, 13th Countess of Loudoun; Captain Walter Strickland Lord

Michael Edward Abney-Hastings, 14th Earl of Loudoun (born Michael Edward Lord; 22 July 1942 – 30 June 2012), was a British-Australian farmer, who is most noted because of the 2004 documentary Britain's Real Monarch, which alleged he was the rightful monarch of England instead of Queen Elizabeth II. From February 1960 until November 2002, he held the courtesy title Lord Mauchline.

Loudoun was born in England and educated at Ampleforth College in Yorkshire, but emigrated to Jerilderie, New South Wales, as a teen, where he was a rice farmer and family man. In Australia, he used the name Michael Hastings. He was the heir-general of George Plantagenet, the younger brother of Edward IV of England. If Edward IV had been illegitimate and the crown of England had descended by male-preference primogeniture before 1500, then George (and his heirs) would have been monarchs of England.

== Early life ==
Abney-Hastings was born in Sussex, England, to Captain Walter Strickland Lord and Barbara Abney-Hastings, 13th Countess of Loudoun, under the name Michael Edward Lord. He later lived at Ashby-de-la-Zouch in Leicestershire, and his name was legally changed via deed poll to Michael Edward Abney-Hastings in 1946. As a youth, he was educated at Ampleforth College in North Yorkshire, before moving to Australia when he was 18 years old.

== Claim to the English throne ==
In 2004, Britain's Real Monarch, a documentary broadcast on Channel 4 in the United Kingdom, repeated the claim that Loudoun, as the senior descendant of George Plantagenet, 1st Duke of Clarence, was the rightful King of England. This argument relied upon two disputed claims: first, that Edward IV of England was illegitimate, based on the accusation that his supposed father, Richard, Duke of York, was absent at the time when Edward is thought to have been conceived; and second, that the Plantagenet crown should have descended by male-preference cognatic primogeniture instead of agnatic primogeniture and conquest. Also, Henry VI had placed an attainder on Edward after he was restored to the throne, and named George, Duke of Clarence, as heir to the throne after Henry VI and his legitimate issue.

== Personal views and family ==
Loudoun expressed no interest in pursuing his potential claim to the throne, although he was amused by it. He refrained from using his peerage title publicly.

Loudoun had two sons and three daughters with his Australian wife, Noelene Margaret (née McCormick; married 1969). His eldest son, Simon, held the courtesy title of Lord Mauchline until his father's death on 30 June 2012. Until his death, the 14th Earl was one of the seven co-heirs to the Barony of Grey of Ruthyn.

- Lady Amanda Louise Abney-Hastings (born 1969)
- Lady Lisa Maree Abney-Hastings (1971–2012)
- Simon Michael Abney-Hastings, 15th Earl of Loudoun (born 1974)
- Lady Rebecca Lee Abney-Hastings (born 1974)
- The Hon. Marcus William Abney-Hastings (born 1981)

As Michael Abney-Hastings, Loudoun was a councillor of the Jerilderie Shire, elected in 2004 and re-elected in 2008.

Loudoun died on 30 June 2012 in New South Wales.

Peerage of Scotland
| Preceded by Barbara Abney-Hastings | Earl of Loudoun; 2002–2012 | Succeeded by Simon Abney-Hastings |
