= Colwyn Philipps, 3rd Viscount St Davids =

British businessman, politician and writer

Colwyn Iestyn John Philipps, 3rd Viscount St Davids (30 January 1939 – 26 April 2009) was a British businessman, Conservative politician and writer on music. Besides his viscountcy, he also held the older titles of Baron Strange of Knockin (1299), Baron Hungerford (1426), and Baron de Moleyns (1445), & the Baronetcy of Picton Castle (1621). He was also a co-heir to the barony of Grey de Ruthyn.

== Background and education ==
Philipps was the son of Jestyn Philipps, 2nd Viscount St Davids and Doreen Guinness Jowett. He was educated at Dulwich College Preparatory School, Haverfordwest Grammar School, Sevenoaks School and in Melbourne, Australia. He returned to the UK to pursue his career, later studying at King's College London where he took a Certificate in Advanced Musical Studies in 1989.

== Career ==
Philipps was a 2nd Lieutenant in the Welsh Guards before he became a partner in the London stockbroking firm of Scrimgeour Kemp-Gee, which was later absorbed by Citicorp. He had a keen interest in music, both historically and as a manuscript collector (at one point owning the largest private collection in existence). He specialized in the life and works of Rossini, contributed to Music & Letters (along with various other musicological works) and was the bibliographer of the Rossini Foundation in Pesaro, Italy.

Lord St Davids succeeded his father in the viscountcy in 1991. He served under John Major as a Lord-in-waiting from 1992 to 1994 and was a Deputy Speaker of the House of Lords from 1995. He was the only Conservative member of the Welsh National Assembly Advisory Group, and his work in relation to Welsh devolution was described by Dafydd Elis-Thomas (Welsh Assembly Presiding Officer) as "the most significant contribution of any Welsh Conservative politician to the cause of devolution; If Ron Davies was the architect of devolution, Colwyn was his enthusiastic draughtsman. His encouragement was unstinting". As a hereditary peer, he was excluded from the House by the House of Lords Act 1999.

== Family ==
Lord St Davids married Augusta Victoria Correa y Larraín Ugarte from Santiago, Chile in 1965. They had two children:

- Rhodri Colwyn Philipps, 4th Viscount St Davids (b. 16 September 1966)
- Hon. Roland Augusto Iestyn Estanislao Philipps (b. 9 Apr 1970), better known as Todd Sharpville, a blues guitarist

St Davids died in April 2009, aged 70, and was succeeded by his elder son. The requiem mass held at his funeral at St Davids Cathedral on 6 May 2009 was believed to be the first Catholic Mass to be held there since the Reformation.

== Arms ==
Coat of arms of Colwyn Philipps, 3rd Viscount St Davids
Coronet A Coronet of a Viscount Crest A Lion as in the Arms Escutcheon Argent a Lion rampant Sable ducally gorged and chained Or langued and armed Gules Supporters Dexter: a Knight vested in chain armour the Jupon charged with the arms of Philipps and resting his exterior hand upon the Hilt of his Sword; Sinister: a Knight vested in plate armour his Jupon charged with the arms of Wogan (Or on a Chief Sable three Martlets of the field) and resting his exterior hand upon the Hilt of his Sword; both standing upon a Battlemented Wall all proper Motto Ducit Amor Patriae ("Patriotism Is My Motive")

Political offices
Preceded by The Baroness Denton of Wakefield	Lord-in-waiting; 1992–1994	Succeeded by The Lord Lucas
Peerage of the United Kingdom
Preceded by Jestyn Philipps	Viscount St Davids; 1991–2009	Succeeded by Rhodri Philipps
