= Todd Sharpville =

The Honourable Todd Sharpville

Background information
- Born: Roland Augusto Jestyn Estanislao Philipps; 9 April 1970 (age 56); London, England
- Genres: Blues, rock, pop
- Occupation: Musician
- Instruments: Guitar, piano
- Labels: Red Lightnin', Cathouse, Revolver, MiG, Dixiefrog, Repertoire
- Website: www.toddsharpville.com

Todd Sharpville (born 9 April 1970 as The Hon. Roland Augusto Jestyn Estanislao Philipps) is an English musician and the younger son of the 3rd Viscount St Davids.

A British musician, singer-songwriter and lead guitarist, mainly in the blues field, it has been asserted that he is "the world's first blue-blooded bluesman", as a titled member of a British aristocratic family. In 2010, the Conservative Party asked him to stand for election as a prospective parliamentary candidate, but he declined the offer.

== Family ==
The younger son of Colwyn Jestyn John Philipps, 3rd Viscount Saint Davids and Augusta Victoria Correa Larrain Ugarte, he and his brother, Rhodri Colwyn Philipps, the 4th Viscount Saint Davids, were raised in the Roman Catholic faith of their mother, and attended Downside and Worth schools, respectively. Sharpville has two daughters.

== Career ==
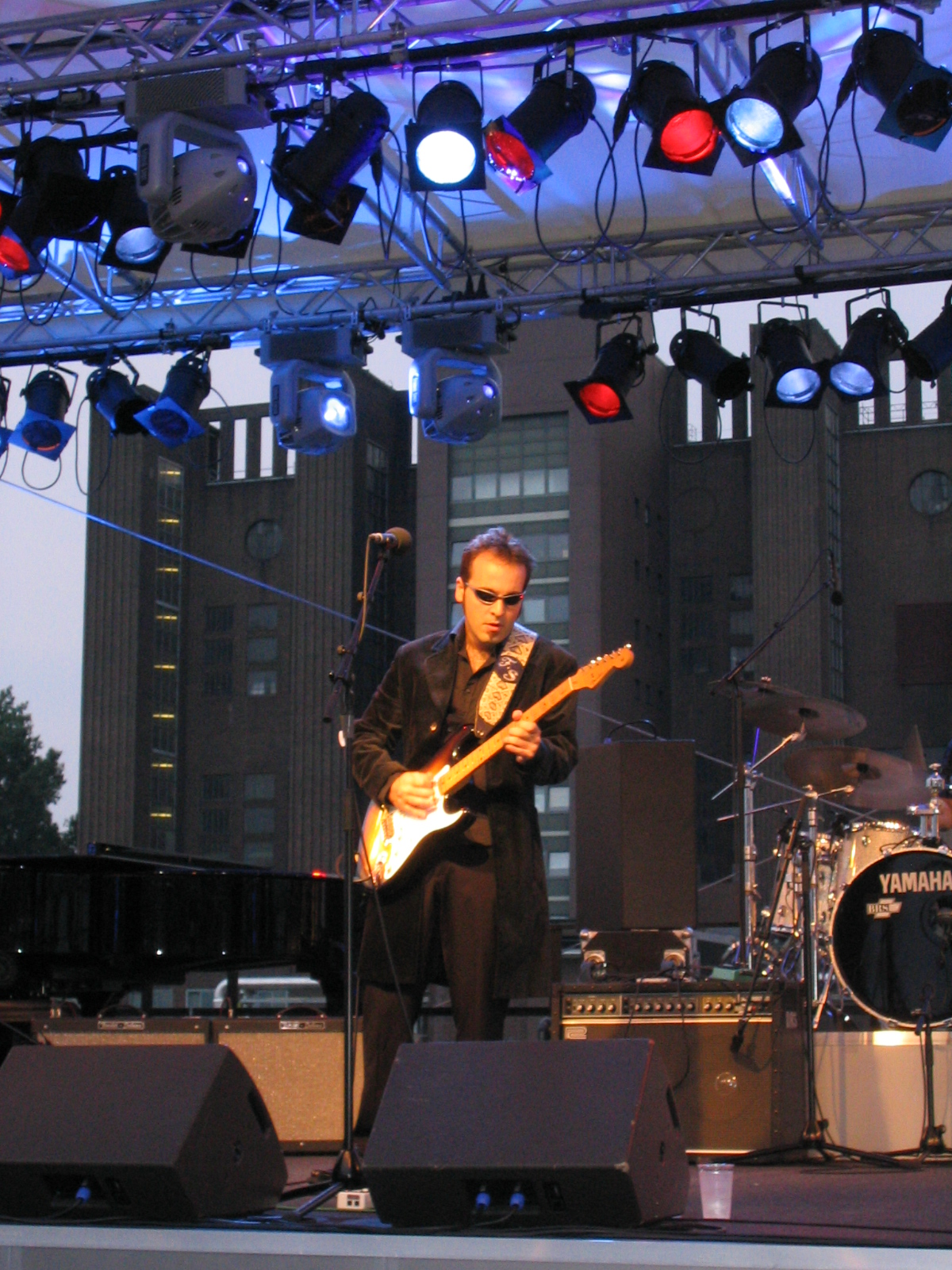
Todd Sharpville in Wolfsburg, Germany, 2004

Sharpville first came to public prominence with his 1994 debut blues album release, Touch of Your Love (Red Lightnin'). The album achieved critical acclaim, winning "Best Album" in 1994 in the British Blues Connection awards (Britain's equivalent to the W.C. Handy Awards). At this time, Sharpville was putting together European backing bands for visiting American blues artists (such as Hubert Sumlin, Ike Turner, Chuck Berry and Byther Smith). He won the British Blues Connection "Best UK Guitarist" award in 1995 (beating fellow nominees Eric Clapton and Gary Moore according to the April 1995 edition of British Blues Connection's Blueprint magazine) and became a mainstay on the European blues circuit as a solo artist.

His second blues album, The Meaning of Life was released in 2001 on Cathouse Records and featured guests Leo Sayer, Eugene "Hideaway" Bridges, Snowy White, Paul Lamb, Keith Dunn, and ex-Rolling Stones guitarist Mick Taylor. In support of this release, Sayer toured extensively, as part of the Todd Sharpville Band. Taylor appeared as a special guest at a limited number of European dates.

Sharpville can also be found on more than 35 compilation albums, and at least five Dana Gillespie releases. He participated in Mick Ronson's Memorial Concert (Citadel Records – recorded at the Hammersmith Apollo in 1994), in Albert Hammond's 2006 release Revolution of the Heart (Sharpville was Hammond's guitarist and musical director) and in Leo Sayer's Voice in My Head (2005). Live performances include appearances with Robbie Williams, Van Morrison, Peter Green, George Michael, Taj Mahal, Albert Collins, Georgie Fame, Kim Wilson, Joe Louis Walker, Tommy Castro, Brian May, and the reformed version of The Yardbirds.

Between 2005 and 2007, Sharpville was the European opening act for Pink, Joe Cocker, and B.B. King. His blues double album, Porchlight, was released on 29 October 2010 by the MiG Music record label. This was produced in Rhode Island by Duke Robillard and featured contributions by Robillard, Joe Louis Walker and Kim Wilson of the Fabulous Thunderbirds.

During the 2020 coronavirus pandemic, Sharpville assembled the world's first professional lockdown backing band which included well known session musicians, living together under one roof in a rented Norfolk mansion. They performed online streaming shows each week, and remotely recorded with a variety of artists. The James Bond film composer David Arnold worked with Sharpville on material forming part of a public awareness campaign, designed to promote unity amongst the general public.

He was chosen as the opening act for Eric Clapton in May 2022, and performed at Clapton’s Royal Albert Hall concerts in London on 7 May 2022 to help promote Sharpville's album, Medication Time.

== Discography ==
=== Albums ===
Year	Title	Record label
1993	Touch of Your Love	Red Lightnin' Records
2001	The Meaning of Life	Cathouse Records
2010	Porchlight	MIG
2022	Medication Time	DixieFrog Records
2023	Live at Rockpalast	Repertoire Records
