= Countess of Loudoun (ship) =

Several vessels have been named Countess of Loudoun (or Countess of Loudon) for the Countess of Loudoun:

- Thetis was launched at Chittagong in 1813. At some point she was renamed Countess of Loudoun (or Countess of Loudon, or erroneously Countess of London). She wrecked in early November 1816 off Palawan.
- Countess of Loudon (1840) was launched in 1840 at Saint John, New Brunswick. She transferred her registry to Glasgow. Her builder was George Thomson, and her dimensions were: 137 ft 10 in (42.0 m) (length), 33 ft 7 in (10.2 m) (breadth), and 22 ft 10 in (7.0 m) (depth of hold). Her tonnage was 702 tons (bm; old measure) and 785 tons (bm;new measure). On 4 August 1854, Shandon caught fire while carrying cargo and 31 passengers from Glasgow to Montreal and Quebec; Countess of Loudon was among the vessels that rescued the crew and passengers.
