= Jestyn Philipps, 2nd Viscount St Davids =

British peer (1917-1991)

Jestyn Reginald Austin Plantagenet Philipps, 2nd Viscount St Davids Bt, (19 February 1917 – 10 June 1991) was a British peer, the only surviving son of John Philipps, 1st Viscount St Davids, and his second wife, Elizabeth Philipps, Viscountess St Davids (née Abney-Hastings).

From his mother, he inherited the baronies of Hungerford, de Moleyns and Strange (de Knockyn).

== Early life ==
St Davids was educated at Eton and Trinity College, Cambridge.

== Professional life ==
At the age of 37, St Davids was forced to sell Roch Castle after his company, which provided canal barge pleasure trips on the Regent's Canal, went bankrupt.

While sitting the House of Lords, St Davids accepted the Labour Whip, although he later described himself as a convert to Thatcherism.

While serving in the Lords, St Davids opposed restriction on immigration. He is also notable for being the first person to raise climate change in the houses of parliament, in 1969, over a decade before it was next mentioned:

"My Lords, can my noble friend say whether he and British Railways have taken account of the fact that what were abnormal temperatures last summer may not be abnormal if we continue to discharge carbon dioxide into the air by the burning of various fossil carbons, so increasing the greenhouse effect?"

St Davids founded a 'pirate club' on the Regent's Canal in Camden Town, north London, which was designed to give local children a chance to spend time on boats.

== Personal life ==
Lord St Davids married three times but had children only by his first wife. His first marriage was to Doreen Guinness Jowett on 5 May 1938. The couple divorced in 1954. His second marriage was to Elisabeth Joyce Woolf on 15 October 1954, but they divorced in October 1959. By his first wife, St Davids had five children:

- Colwyn Jestyn John Philipps, 3rd Viscount St Davids (30 January 1939 – 26 April 2009)
- Hon. Rowena Frances Philipps (1940–2005)
- Hon. Myfanwy Ann Philipps (b. 1944)
- Hon. Rhiannon Elisabeth Philipps (b. 1946)
- Hon. Eiddwen Sara Philipps (b. 1948)

== Arms ==
Coat of arms of Jestyn Philipps, 2nd Viscount St Davids
Coronet A Coronet of a Viscount Crest A Lion as in the Arms Escutcheon Argent a Lion rampant Sable ducally gorged and chained Or langued and armed Gules Supporters Dexter: a Knight vested in chain armour the Jupon charged with the arms of Philipps and resting his exterior hand upon the Hilt of his Sword; Sinister: a Knight vested in plate armour his Jupon charged with the arms of Wogan (Or on a Chief Sable three Martlets of the field) and resting his exterior hand upon the Hilt of his Sword; both standing upon a Battlemented Wall all proper Motto Ducit Amor Patriae ("Patriotism Is My Motive")

Peerage of the United Kingdom
Preceded by John Philipps	Viscount St Davids; 1938–1991	Succeeded by Colwyn Philipps
Peerage of England
Preceded by Elizabeth Philipps	Baron Strange; Baron Hungerford; Baron de Moleyns; 1974–1991	Succeeded by Colwyn Philipps
