= Elizabeth Philipps, Viscountess St Davids =

British peeress (1884-1974)

Elizabeth Frances Philipps, Viscountess St Davids, 22nd Baroness Hungerford, 20th Baroness de Moleyns, 14th Baroness Strange (née Abney-Hastings) (10 June 1884 – 12 December 1974) was a British peeress. Following the passing of the Peerage Act 1963, she became the first woman to take her seat in the House of Lords by virtue of an hereditary peerage as 14th Baroness Strange.

== Biography ==
She was the second daughter and coheir of Hon. Paulyn Abney-Hastings (the second son of Charles Abney-Hastings, 1st Baron Donington and Edith Rawdon-Hastings, 10th Countess of Loudoun) and his wife, Lady Maud née Grimston (the third daughter of James Grimston, 2nd Earl of Verulam).

On 27 April 1916, she married John Philipps, 1st Baron St Davids (created Viscount St Davids in 1918); they had two children.

== Peerages ==
On 19 October 1920, Lady St Davids and her sister, Edith Abney-Hastings, 12th Countess of Loudoun, petitioned the Committee for Privileges for the baronies of Botreaux, Hungerford, de Moleyns, Hastings (de Hastings) and Hastings (de Hungerford), which were abeyant between them and their other sister, Lady Flora, since the death of the 11th Earl. They also petitioned for the baronies of Strange (de Knockyn) and Stanley as descendants of the last holder, Ferdinando Stanley, 5th Earl of Derby. The sisters were confirmed as co-heirs to the baronies on 17 December. On 23 February 1921, the viscountess was granted the baronies of Hungerford, de Moleyns and Strange (de Knockyn), whilst those of Botreaux, Stanley and Hastings (de Hastings) were granted to the countess on 7 March.

On 23 June that year, the two sisters also petitioned for the earldoms of Warwick and Salisbury, and for the baronies of Montagu, Montacute, Monthermer and Pole of Montagu, as descendants of Edward Plantagenet, 17th Earl of Warwick and Margaret Pole, 8th Countess of Salisbury, and for the latter's attainders to be reversed. However, James Gascoyne-Cecil, 4th Marquess of Salisbury and Francis Greville, 5th Earl of Warwick counter-petitioned and the attainders were not reversed.

On 31 July 1963, the Peerage Act 1963 came into effect, which, among other things, enabled women to sit and vote in the House of Lords by virtue of an hereditary peerage. Following the passage of the Act, Lady St Davids applied for a writ of summons to the House of Lords in right of her barony, which was subsequently issued to her, and she took her seat in the House on 19 November 1963.

On the death of Lady St Davids in 1974 her titles passed to her only son, Jestyn.

Peerage of England
Preceded by Ferdinando Stanley	Baroness Strange; 1921–1974	Succeeded by Jestyn Philipps
Preceded by Charles Rawdon-Hastings	Baroness Hungerford; Baroness de Moleyns; 1921–1974	Succeeded by Jestyn Philipps
