= Barbara Abney-Hastings, 13th Countess of Loudoun =

Scottish countess in her own right

The Right Honourable The Countess of Loudoun

Countess of Loudoun
- In office 24 February 1960 – 1 November 2002
- Preceded by: Edith Abney-Hastings
- Succeeded by: Michael Abney-Hastings

Personal details
- Born: 3 July 1919
- Died: 1 November 2002 (aged 83)
- Spouse(s): Walter Strickland Lord; Gilbert Frederick Greenwood; Peter Griffiths
- Children: 6, including Michael Abney-Hastings, 14th Earl of Loudoun
- Parent(s): Edith Abney-Hastings, 12th Countess of Loudoun; Reginald Huddleston
- Relatives: Elizabeth Philipps, Viscountess St Davids (maternal aunt); Norrie MacLaren (nephew)

Barbara Huddleston Abney-Hastings, 13th Countess of Loudoun (3 July 1919 – 1 November 2002), was a Scottish countess in her own right, and a member of the House of Lords. Lady Loudoun was the oldest daughter of Reginald Mowbray Chichester Huddleston and Edith Abney-Hastings, 12th Countess of Loudoun. Her father took her mother's last name. Her only brother, Ian Huddleston Abney-Hastings, styled Lord Mauchline (1918–1944), was killed in Italy in World War II, so as the eldest sister, Barbara succeeded to the earldom in 1960.

Lady Loudoun was a member of the House of Lords until 1999, when the right of hereditary peers to sit in the Lords was abolished. She sat as a cross-bencher, and was concerned with social justice. She lived in Ashby-de-la-Zouch, Leicestershire.

== Ancestry ==
On her mother's side, she was descended from and heir-general of George Plantagenet, 1st Duke of Clarence. Her other notable ancestors include Mary Tudor, Queen of France; King James IV of Scotland; William Cecil, 1st Baron Burghley; and Alice Spencer, Countess of Derby.

== Marriages and children ==
Lady Loudoun married three times. She married, firstly, Captain Walter Strickland Lord on 5 September 1939. They had one child:

- Michael Abney-Hastings, 14th Earl of Loudoun (1942–2012)

Her second marriage was on 21 November 1945 to Captain Gilbert Frederick Greenwood. They had two children:

- Lady Selina Mary Abney-Hastings (b. 1946)
- Hon. Frederick James Abney-Hastings (b. 1949)

Her third and final marriage was to Peter Griffiths on 15 September 1954. They had three children:

- Lady Margaret Maud Abney-Hastings (b. 1956)
- Lady Mary Joy Abney-Hastings (b. 1957)
- Lady Clare Louise Abney-Hastings (b. 1958)

On her death, she was succeeded by her oldest son.

Peerage of Scotland
| Preceded by Edith Abney-Hastings | Countess of Loudoun; 24 February 1960 – 1 November 2002 | Succeeded by Michael Abney-Hastings |
