= Edith Abney-Hastings, 12th Countess of Loudoun =

British peeress (1883-1960)

The Right Honourable The Countess of Loudoun

Countess of Loudoun
- In office 17 May 1920 – 24 February 1960
- Preceded by: Charles Clifton
- Succeeded by: Barbara Abney-Hastings

Baroness Botreaux Baroness Hastings Baroness Hastings
- In office 23 February 1921 – 24 February 1960
- Preceded by: Vacant; Abeyant since 1920; Title last held by Charles Clifton
- Succeeded by: Vacant; Abeyant

Baroness Stanley
- In office 1921 – 24 February 1960
- Preceded by: Vacant; Abeyant since 1594; Title last held by Ferdinando Stanley
- Succeeded by: Vacant; Abeyant

Personal details
- Born: 13 May 1883
- Died: 24 February 1960 (aged 76)
- Spouse: Reginald Huddleston (m. 1916; div. 1947)
- Children: Ian Abney-Hastings, Lord Mauchline; Barbara Abney-Hastings, 13th Countess of Loudoun; Lady Jean Abney-Hastings, Campbell of Loudoun; Lady Iona French; Fiona de Fresnes, Baroness de Fresnes; Lady Edith Maclaren
- Parent(s): Hon. Paulyn Abney-Hastings; Lady Maud Grimston
- Relatives: Elizabeth Philipps, Viscountess St Davids (sister); Norrie MacLaren (grandson)

Edith Maud Abney-Hastings, 12th Countess of Loudoun (13 May 1883 – 24 February 1960) was a British peeress.

== Family ==
She was the first daughter and coheir of Hon. Paulyn Abney-Hastings (the second son of Charles Abney-Hastings, 1st Baron Donington, and Edith Rawdon-Hastings, 10th Countess of Loudoun) and his wife, Lady Maud née Grimston (the third daughter of James Grimston, 2nd Earl of Verulam).

On 12 December 1916, she married Captain Reginald Huddleston, who adopted her surname. They divorced in 1947 after having six children:

- Captain Ian Huddleston Abney-Hastings, Lord Mauchline (1918 – 11 July 1944), killed in Italy in World War II
- Lady Barbara Huddleston Abney-Hastings (1919–2002), later 13th Countess of Loudoun
- Lady Jean Huddleston Abney-Hastings (later Campbell of Loudoun, 1920–1981), married (1) Edgar Wakefield, (2) Arthur Hubble
- Lady Iona Mary Huddleston Abney-Hastings (1922–1990), married Robert French
- Lady Fiona Huddleston Abney-Hastings (1923–1993), married Robert Conroy-Robertson (later de Fresnes), 12th baron de Fresnes
- Lady Edith Huddleston Abney-Hastings (1925–2006), married David Maclaren (they had two children, Norman Angus MacLaren and Roderick John MacLaren).

== Peerages ==
On 17 May 1920, she inherited the earldom of Loudoun from her childless uncle, Charles Clifton, 11th Earl of Loudoun.

On 19 October that year, she and her sister, Viscountess St Davids, petitioned the Committee for Privileges for the baronies of Botreaux, Hungerford, de Moleyns, Hastings (de Hastings) and Hastings (de Hungerford), which were abeyant between them and their other sister, Lady Flora, since the death of the 11th Earl. They also petitioned for the baronies of Strange (de Knockyn) and Stanley as descendants of the last holder, Ferdinando Stanley, 5th Earl of Derby. The sisters were confirmed as co-heirs to the baronies on 17 December. On 23 February 1921, the viscountess was granted the baronies of Hungerford, de Moleyns and Strange (de Knockyn), whilst those of Botreaux, Stanley and Hastings (de Hastings) were granted to the countess on 7 March.

On 23 June that year, the two sisters also petitioned for the earldoms of Warwick and Salisbury, and for the baronies of Montagu, Montacute, Monthermer and Pole of Montagu, as descendants of Edward Plantagenet, 17th Earl of Warwick, and Margaret Pole, 8th Countess of Salisbury, and for the latters attainders to be reversed. However, James Gascoyne-Cecil, 4th Marquess of Salisbury, and Francis Greville, 5th Earl of Warwick, counter-petitioned and the attainders were not reversed.

On Lady Loudoun's death in 1960, her earldom passed to her eldest surviving child, Lady Barbara, whilst her English baronies became abeyant again, between her five daughters.

== The Great Fire ==
On 1 December 1941, the family comprising Lady Loudoun, her daughters and infant granddaughter Sheena, were sleeping in their rooms under the first floor library in Loudoun Castle. Heating was by coal and log fires and it is thought that burning resin came back down the library chimney and set the wooden floor alight. The resulting fire destroyed the building, except for the stone walls.

No one from the family has slept in the castle since that night. In 1995 the castle grounds were converted into a popular amusement park.

Peerage of Scotland
Preceded by Charles Clifton	Countess of Loudoun; 17 May 1920–24 February 1960	Succeeded by Barbara Abney-Hastings
Peerage of England
Vacant Abeyant since 1920 Title last held by Charles Clifton	Baroness Botreaux; Baroness Hastings; 23 February 1921–24 February 1960	Vacant Abeyant
Vacant Abeyant since 1594 Title last held by Ferdinando Stanley	Baroness Stanley; 1921–24 February 1960	Vacant Abeyant
