= Keith Dunn (musician) =

American musician

Keith Dunn is an American harmonica player, singer, producer and songwriter. He was born in Boston and has been playing blues music for over 30 years. He is the founder of record label DeeTone Records.

== Biography ==
As a nine-year-old, Dunn saw his first concert when T-Bone Walker played a free outdoor concert. At the age of 12, he bought a harmonica and began playing it at parties and with street players. In his early career he played only acoustic harmonica.

After seeing the Junior Wells – Buddy Guy Band he put his first real band together, Blue Lightning. They played material by Junior Wells, Jimmy Rogers, Aleck "Rice" Miller (Sonny Boy Williamson II), and also James Cotton and Muddy Waters. Dunn's second band was called the Honeydrippers.

Dunn presently lives in the Netherlands. He works as a record producer and has performed with James Cotton, Hubert Sumlin, Roy Eldridge, Big Walter Horton, Lurrie Bell, Jimmy Rogers and Big Mama Thornton. He regularly tours with The Love Gloves and The International Blues Band and also appears as a guest musician with different artists, such as Big Jack Johnson.

== Solo albums ==
- Alone With The Blues (Keith Dunn) (DeeTone Records, 2003)
- Delta Roll (Keith Dunn and Lars Vegas & The Love Gloves) (2006)

== Albums produced by Keith Dunn ==
- She's Magic (Willem van Dullemen) released on DeeTone Records
