= Britain's Real Monarch =

2004 British historical documentary

- Country of origin: United Kingdom

Original release
- Network: Channel 4
- Release: 3 January 2004

Britain's Real Monarch is a historical documentary presented by Tony Robinson first shown on Channel 4 on 3 January 2004. It has also been broadcast in Australia and in the United States. The documentary discusses the descendants of George Plantagenet, Duke of Clarence, and their claim to the throne of England.

== Thesis ==
The programme based its thesis on the centuries-old claim that Edward IV was illegitimate, born to Cecily, Duchess of York in Rouen, by an English archer (surnamed Blaybourne by some) while her husband, Richard Plantagenet, 3rd Duke of York, was fighting in Pontoise.

The Duke and Duchess of York were in Rouen as Richard was at that time the English King’s lieutenant in France.

The legitimacy of Edward IV was the subject of speculation at the time, and a document in Rouen Cathedral is presented by Michael Jones as indicating that Richard and Cecily were about 100 miles (160 km) apart during the five-week period when Edward's conception must have occurred (assuming that the pregnancy went to a normal term). A number of historians have since challenged the conclusions reached by the programme.

If Edward were indeed illegitimate, then he and his descendants would have had no valid claim to the throne, so the programme suggests that the 'real' monarchs were the heirs of his legitimate brother George, Duke of Clarence. At the time, this line was represented by The 14th Earl of Loudoun (who usually styled himself simply as Michael Hastings), who had emigrated to Australia in 1960, married, fathered five children, and lived in Jerilderie, New South Wales, until his death in June 2012.

== See also ==
- Alternative successions of the English crown, for the genealogical descent serving as the basis for the show
