= Inverkeithny =

Village in Aberdeenshire, Scotland

Coordinates: 57.5115°N 2.6202°W

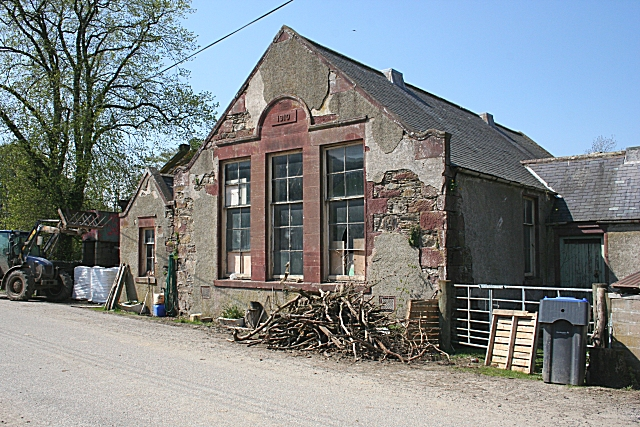
Inverkeithny School

Inverkeithny is a village in the Formartine area of Aberdeenshire, Scotland. The village lies near where the Burn of Forgue flows into the River Deveron, 7 miles (11 km) west of Turriff and 3 miles (5 km) south-east of Aberchirder. In 1990, it was described by Charles McKean as "near-deserted".

Netherdale House, an Italianate mansion on a bluff high above the river, was built in 1774, while Muiresk House dates to before 1604. Carnousie, a Z-plan chateau of the Ogilvies of Carnousie, was built in 1577.

Gordon Hay, the author of the first complete translation of the Bible into the Scots language was raised in Inverkeithny.

== Population of the parish ==
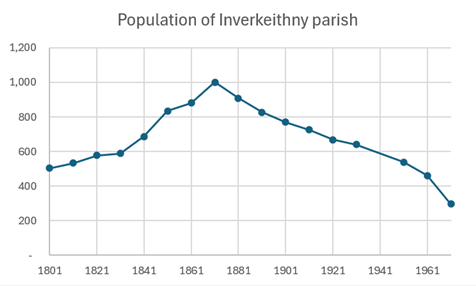

Year	Total population	Population change
1801	503	N/A
1811	533	30
1821	577	44
1831	589	12
1841	687	98
1851	835	148
1861	880	45
1871	1000	120
1881	909	−91
1891	826	−83
1901	769	−57
1911	725	−44
1921	667	−58
1931	640	−27
1951	539	−101
1961	460	−79
1971	297	−163

== Inverkeithny parish church ==
The parish church was built, probably by Alexander and William Reid, in 1881, costing nearly £2,000. The church is now owned and operated by Inverkeithny Kirk Preservation Trust, a registered Scottish charity.
