= Newmilns =

Village in East Ayrshire, Scotland

Coordinates: 55.608°N 4.329°W

Newmilns: Scottish Gaelic: Am Muileann Ùr
- Burgh (Newmilns and Greenholm) and Village
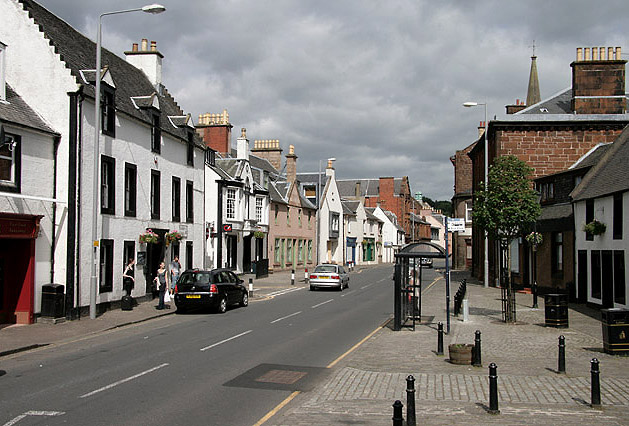
- The main street in Newmilns, 2010

- Location within East Ayrshire
- Population: 2,720 (2020)
- Language: English
- OS grid reference: NS533372
- Council area: East Ayrshire
- Lieutenancy area: Ayrshire and Arran
- Country: Scotland
- Sovereign state: United Kingdom
- Post town: Newmilns
- Postcode district: KA16
- Dialling code: 01560
- Police: Scotland
- Fire: Scottish
- Ambulance: Scottish
- UK Parliament: Kilmarnock and Loudoun
- Scottish Parliament: Kilmarnock and Irvine Valley

Newmilns (Scottish Gaelic: Am Muileann Ùr) is a village in the burgh of Newmilns and Greenholm, in East Ayrshire, Scotland. It has a population of 3,057 people (2001 census) and lies on the A71, around seven miles east of Kilmarnock and twenty-five miles southwest of Glasgow. It is situated in a valley through which the River Irvine runs and, with the neighbouring towns of Darvel and Galston, forms an area known as the Upper Irvine Valley (locally referred to as The Valley).

As the name suggests, the burgh exists in two parts – Newmilns to the north of the river and Greenholm to the south. The river also divides the parishes of Loudoun and Galston, which is why the burgh, although generally referred to as Newmilns, has retained both names.

== Etymology ==
The name itself appears to have its origins in Old English, niwe (new) / mylen (mill), so it could be dated to the Old English period (c. mid-5th to mid-12th centuries). The earliest known recording of the name appears as Nawemeln in 1126, with the use of the plural s dating from at least as early as the 15th century. The Gaelic name Am Muileann Ùr is a translation of the English name.

Of the mills themselves, little now remains. The last in operation was Pate's Mill, which sat on Brown Street opposite the railway station (present-day Vesuvius building). Famed in Allan Ramsay's poem, "The Lass o Pate's Mill", it was demolished in 1977 and all that now remains is part of the mill's exterior wall. The only mill building still intact can be found at the foot of Ladeside. Now used as housing, Loudoun Mill (formerly the Meal Mill / Corn Mill of Newmilns) was in use from 1593 until it stopped producing meal in the 1960s. In 1970, the mill wheel was removed and the lade filled in, with the only remaining suggestion of the site's former use being a motto, "No Mill, No Meal – JA 1914" inscribed on the outer wall.

== History ==
=== Early history ===
Evidence of early habitation can be found across The Valley, with the earliest sites dating from around 2000 BC. To the east of Loudoun Gowf Course, evidence has been found of the existence of a Neolithic stone circle and a Neolithic burial mound lies underneath the approach to the seventh green. A site in Henryton uncovered a Neolith barrow containing stone axes (c. 1500 BC) and a Bronze Age cairn dating from about 1000 BC (the cairn itself contains cists which are thought to have been made by bronze weapons or tools).

Following this early period, from around AD 200 evidence exists of not only a Roman camp at Loudoun Hill, but also a Roman road running through The Valley to the coast at Ayr. The camp was uncovered through quarry work taking place south of Loudoun Hill but tragically much of this evidence has been lost. According to local workmen, many of the uncovered remains & artefacts were taken with the rest of the quarried materials to be used in road construction projects.

Typically, little is known of The Valley's history during the Dark Ages, but it seems likely that an important battle was fought around AD 575 at the Glen Water. In addition, given the strong strategic importance of Newmilns' position as a suitable fording place and a bottleneck on one of Scotland's main east–west trade routes, it is not unlikely that other battles and skirmishes occurred during this period.

The period AD 800 – 1200 can be characterised by the presence of a motte and medieval earthworks north of Loudoun Kirk, the remnants of a medieval castle and lime-kilns to the west of Woodhead Farm and a profusion of forts across Loudoun Parish. These have been attributed to the presence of Vikings in the area.

=== Burgh of Barony ===
Newmilns became a free Burgh of Barony on 9 January 1490, a privilege bestowed upon George Campbell of Loudoun (and consequently the people of Newmilns) by King James IV. This was an important stage in the development of Newmilns as it granted liberties over control of the local economy, the right to elect local Baillies and necessary local government officials and the right to hold weekly markets and annual fairs.

Newmilns is Ayrshire's oldest inland burgh, ahead of Auchinleck (1507), Cumnock (1509) Mauchline (1510), Kilmaurs (1527) and Kilmarnock (1592). The granting of burgh status is generally recognised by residents of Newmilns as the birth of the town, hence the quincentenary celebrations in 1990. Newmilns was upgraded to a Burgh of Regality in 1707 and became a Police Burgh in 1834.

=== Christianity and Conflict ===
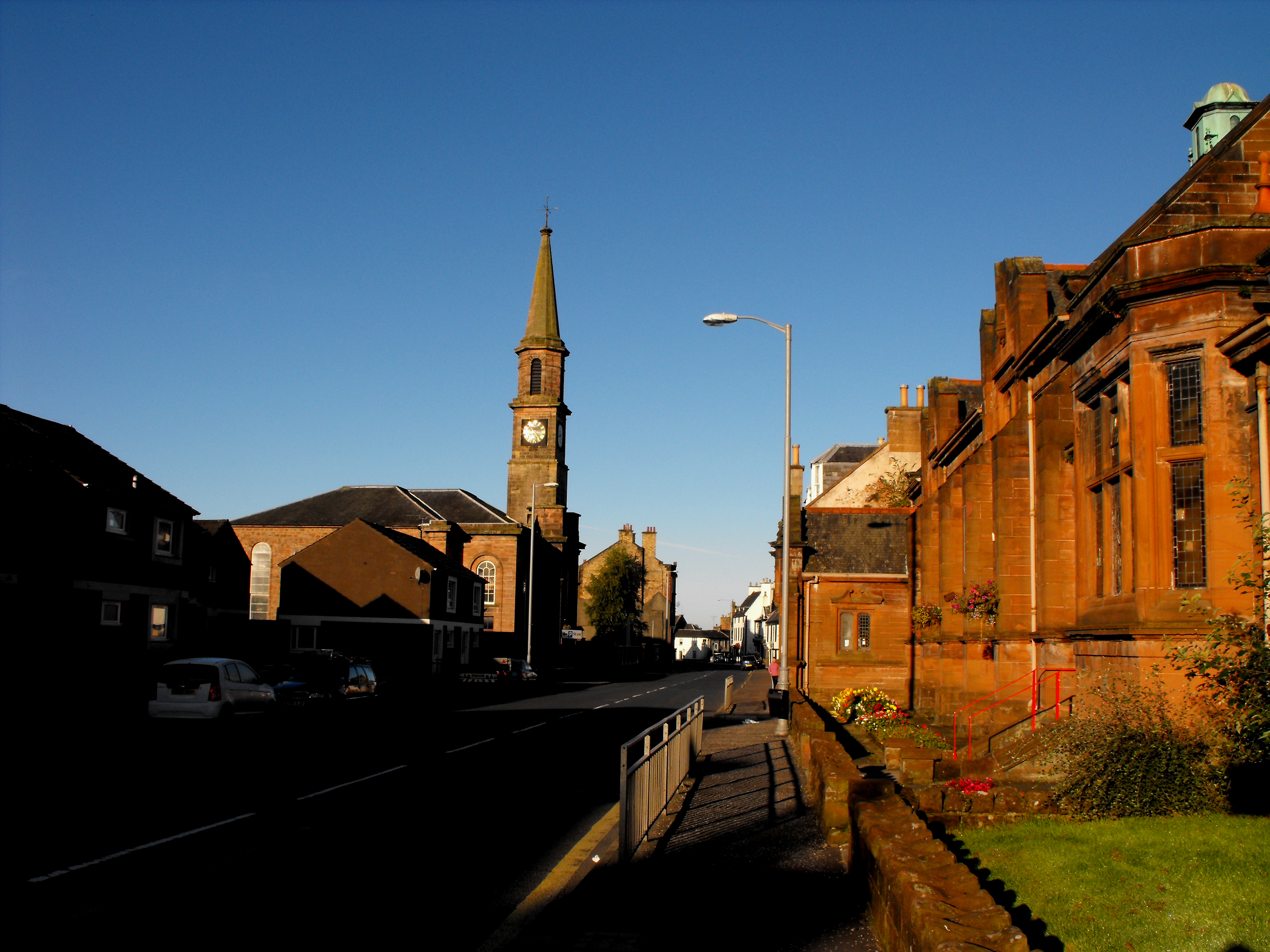
Loudoun Church, as viewed from the Morton Hall.

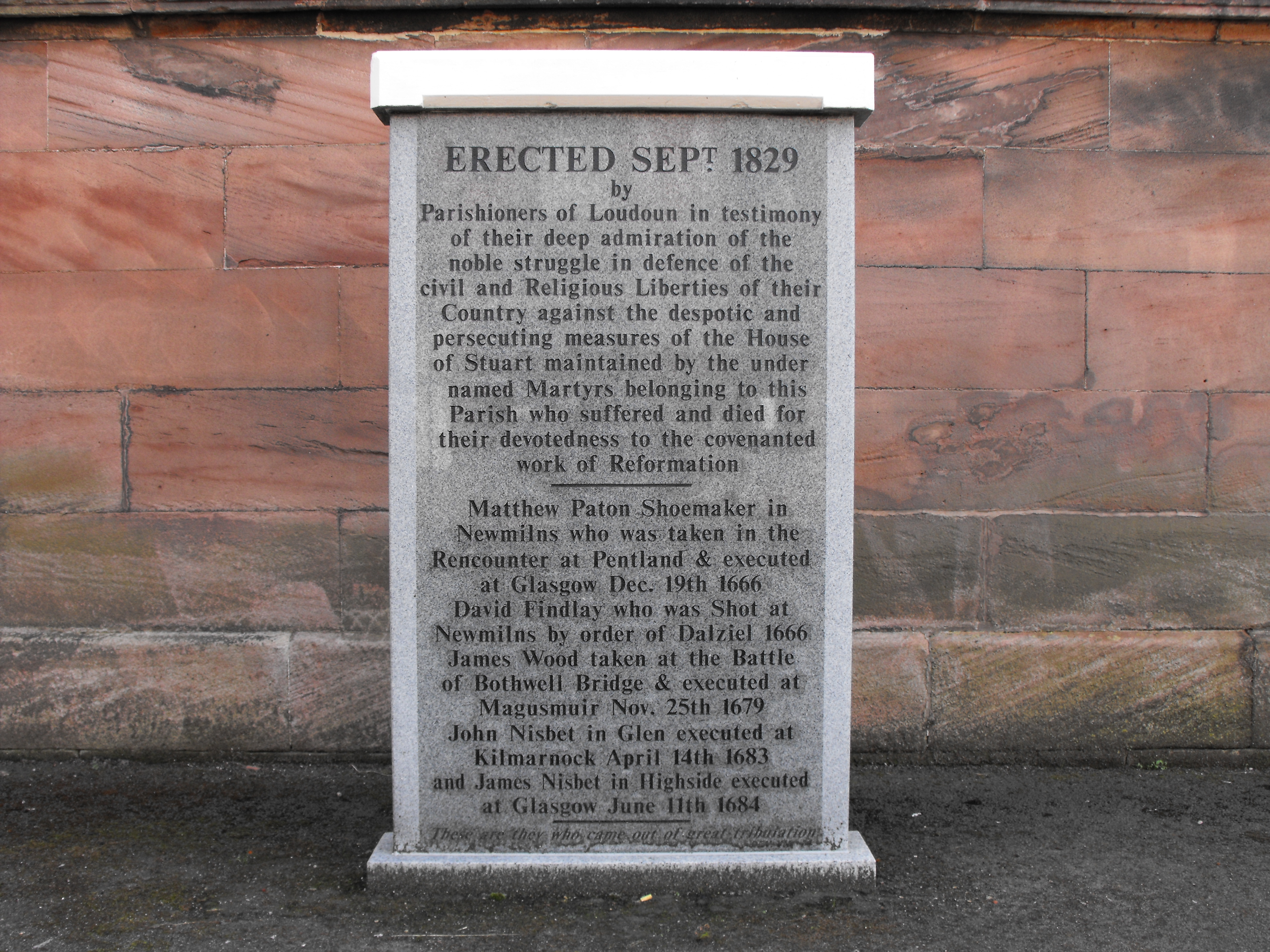
Covenanters memorial in the grounds of Loudoun Church.

The establishment of Loudoun Kirk about two miles west of Newmilns marks the earliest known Christian worship in the area. The building is generally accepted as having been erected in 1451, although this has been disputed. To accommodate Newmilns' growing population, a chapel was erected in 1530 and became the main parish church at some point after 1600. (It is speculated that this happened in 1738, with the erection of a church on the present day Main Street site of Loudoun Church, but no evidence exists to confirm this). Latterly, Newmilns had three distinct congregations and church buildings: Loudoun Old (Church of Scotland), Loudoun East (Free Kirk) and Newmilns West (United Presbyterian). The West Church congregation was dissolved in 1961. The East Church and Loudoun Church congregations amalgamated in 1980, and Loudoun Church is now the main place of Church of Scotland worship in Newmilns. The disused church buildings were demolished in 1961 and 1986 respectively, with West Church Street and East Church Court marking the former whereabouts of these buildings. A congregation of the Free Church of Scotland meets in the Morton Hall in the Main Street.

Around 1520, a local farmer and Lollard called Murdoch Nisbet produced the first Scots Language version of the New Testament. At the time, it was illegal to possess a layman's copy of The Bible, with the offence punishable by either imprisonment or death. This, coupled with the political persecution of Lollards, forced Nisbet to flee the country. Thankfully, Nisbet was eventually able to return and upon his death, bequeathed the book to his son. It was subsequently passed down through generations of the Nisbet family before coming into the possession of the British Museum, where it remains today. In 2003, a new housing development was named Murdoch Nisbet Court in his honour.

The century following Nisbet saw yet more religious upheaval. In 1638, the male head of every household was required to sign the National Covenant which brought all concerned under threat of religious persecution. On 1 June 1679, a large conventicle taking place near Loudoun Hill was attacked by a company of dragoons, led by John Graham of Claverhouse. This encounter was to become known as the Battle of Drumclog and saw the Covenanters successfully rout Claverhouse's forces. It is known that Nisbet's great-grandson, John Nisbet was present at Drumclog, as were Newmilns residents John Gebbie and John Morton, who both died during the battle. From this, it is highly likely that many more Newmilns residents were in attendance.

Alongside Gebbie and Morton, Newmilns claims several other Covenanter martyrs. A memorial stone in the grounds of Loudoun Church records the names of Matthew Paton (captured during the Pentland Rising and executed in Glasgow on 19 December 1666), David Findlay (shot in Newmilns by order of General Dalziel in 1666), James Wood (captured at the Battle of Bothwell Brig and executed at Magus Muir on 25 November 1679), James Nisbet (executed in Glasgow on 11 June 1684) and the aforementioned John Nisbet (fought at Pentland, Drumclog and Bothwell Brig, captured during a service in Fenwick and executed at Kilmarnock Cross on 14 April 1683). A stone plaque in Castle Street also records the name of John Law, who was shot in April 1685 while successfully helping eight Covenanters escape their imprisonment in Newmilns Keep.

=== Weaving, Lace and Industrialisation ===
Towards the end of the 16th century, Huguenot refugees settled in the area and introduced Newmilns to the craft of weaving. About two centuries later, Britain began importing cotton from the United States and as Newmilns by this time had a long-established weaving tradition, the town's handloom industry rose to national prominence. The success of this industry can be seen by the growth in population from around 500 in 1750 to 2,000 in 1850. Newmilns also became very prosperous during this period, evidenced by both buildings around the Cross and the institution of the Trades' Race in 1743, which became an annual event for many years to come.

Born in Newmilns in 1821, Joseph Hood became a major player in the lace industry. By the age of 21, he had already developed, manufactured and supplied many Jacquard Looms and throughout his life, was responsible for many weaving innovations. Handloom weaving however was in decline. The introduction of the power loom in 1877 and general move towards automation left many weavers unemployed, resulting in a population drop as many left Newmilns to find work. Joseph Hood and his colleague, Hugh Morton, installed a lace curtain machine in Newmilns in 1876 and very quickly, others followed suit. Within ten years, a further eight companies had formed, providing work for over 1,500 people.

The success of the lace industry prompted a boom in the urban development of Newmilns. The town expanded rapidly in all directions, particularly to the east of the townfoot and south into Greenholm, with areas such as Loudoun Road, Darvel Road and Borebrae seeing the erection of many villas for Newmilns' growing middle-class. This was further augmented by the creation of council housing during the 20th century, primarily in Gilfoot, Mason's Holm, Campbell Street and Ladeside. Expansion slowed however as the lace industry fell into decline during the 20th century, with foreign competition, World War I, the Great Depression and World War II all contributing to the loss of markets and access to raw materials. The original Hood & Morton factory still stands on Nelson Street, but it is now disused. Only two lace mills remain in operation.

=== Modern era ===
Newmilns has suffered a significant drop in employment through the aforementioned decline of the lace industry, the closure of the Bleachfield, the railway station, the Cooperative and many other major employers including most recently, the Vesuvius plant in Brown Street. Many shopkeepers and tradesmen, who were dependent upon the business of locally employed residents have also gone out of business. This is reflected by the transformation of Newmilns from an industrial town into a commuter town, which is evidenced by a higher-than-average proportion of Newmilns' residents having to travel to their place of employment and a drop in population from a pre-war 5,000 to just over 3,000 today. Newmilns was affected in the July 2007 floods across the UK.

== Environment ==
=== Landscape ===
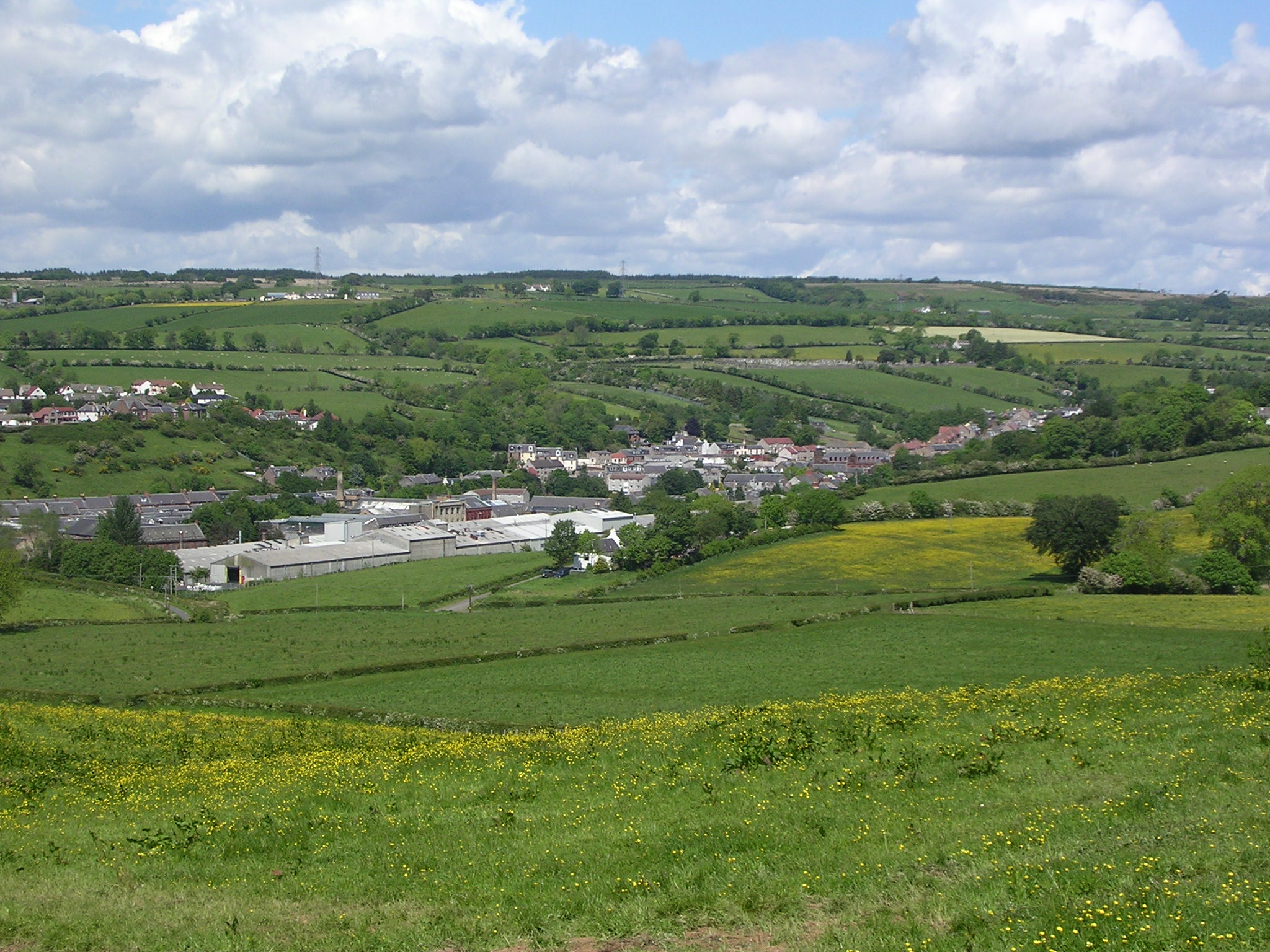
View from Winnyhill showing the shape & contour of The Valley.

Newmilns lies at the foot of a glaciated valley and is mostly surrounded by farmland and woodland. Of particular interest is the Lanfine Estate, which lies to the south of the town. The estate, although much older, came into the possession of the Brown family in 1769 and expanded from an initial 400 acres (1.6 km^{2}) to over 10,000 acres (40 km^{2}) by the end of the following century. The Browns' management of the estate not only oversaw this vast expansion of land, but saw many improvements to the land itself, including a large afforestation program (resulting in the present-day Lanfine Wood), the erection of a stately home and three gatehouses, the installation of Browns Road (which runs from Newmilns to Darvel and allows access to the estate) and the introduction of small game to the area. 2,200 acres (8.9 km^{2}) of the estate were bought by Herr Roesner in 1982 and development has continued, which most notably saw the introduction of wild boar to the estate during the 1990s. Today, both Browns Road and Lanfine are popular walks for residents of Newmilns.

=== Townscape ===
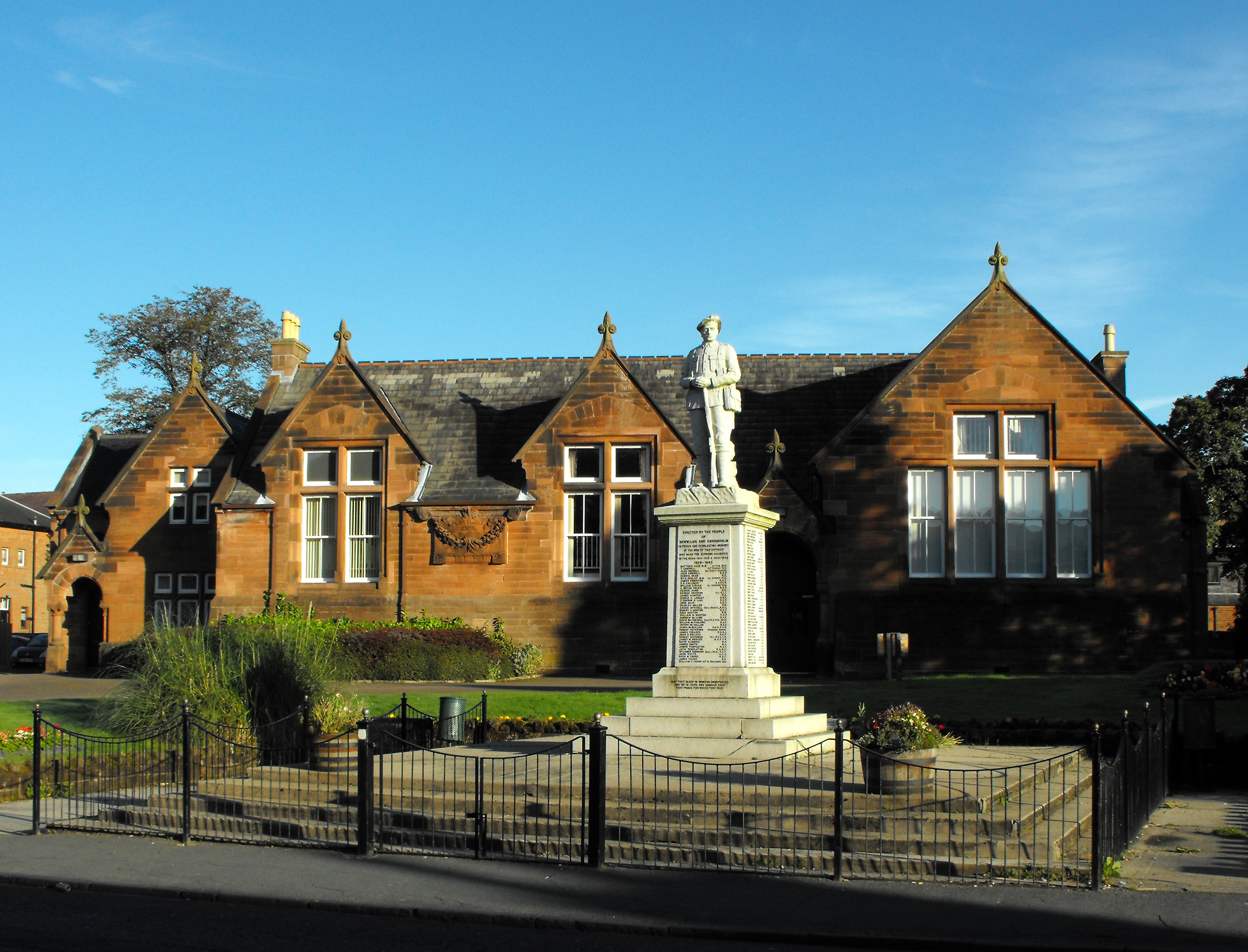
Lady Flora's Institute (built in memory of the tragic Lady Flora Hastings) with war memorial in front.

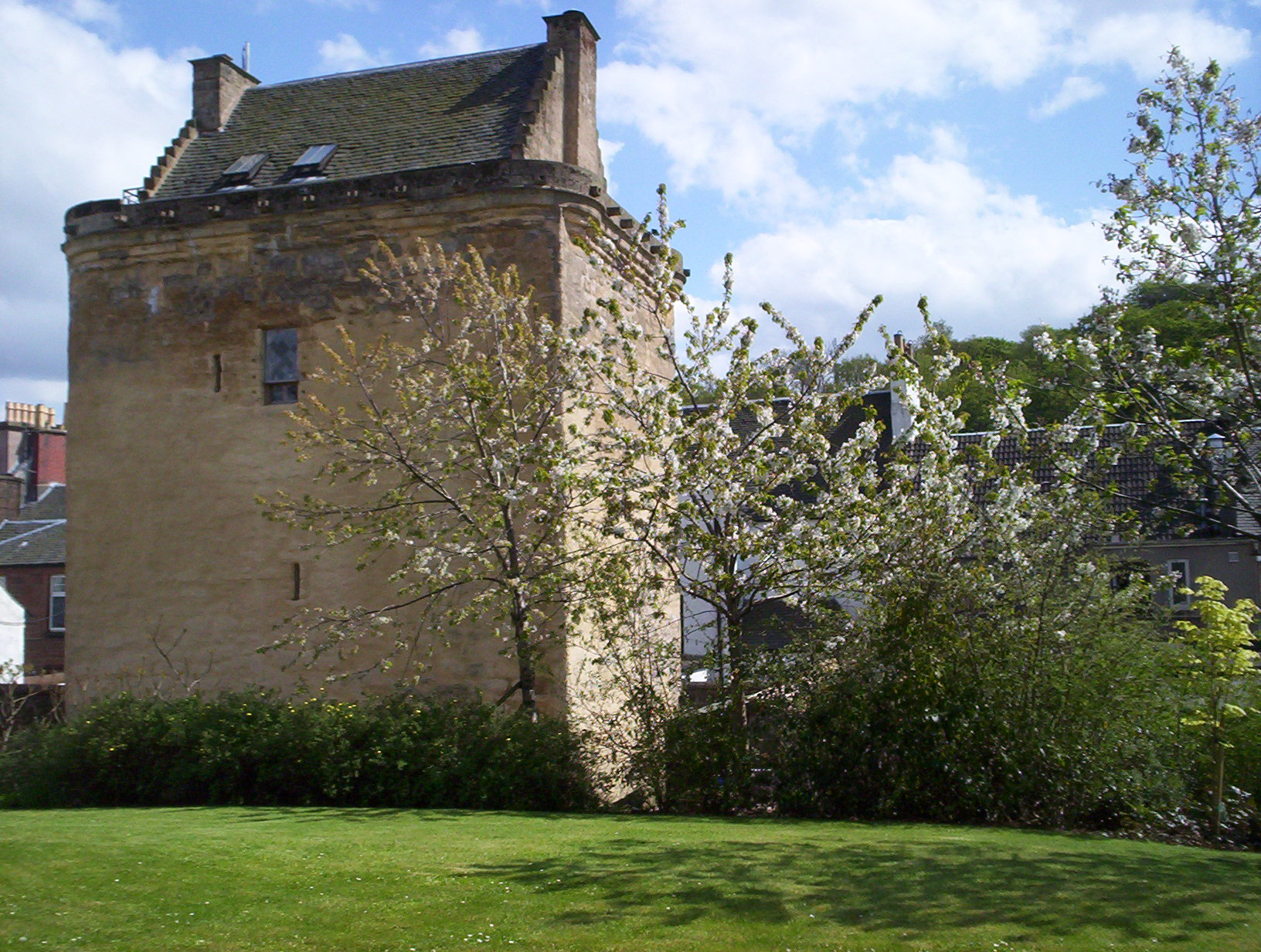
Newmilns Keep, probably built by Sir Hugh Campbell in the 1530s.

Newmilns extends for about two miles along the narrowest part of The Valley and roughly follows the course of the river. Most of the town sits on the north side of the river; the south side remains less developed, despite being generally flatter. Newmilns' urban development is reasonably easy to chart – as the town extends from The Cross to its outskirts, newer buildings become more abundant and the A71 gradually widens. In recent years, redevelopment of disused factories and buildings has brought new housing into older areas of the town, although some of these buildings have retained their original facade.

Newmilns' most significant buildings are concentrated in and around The Cross. The townhouse was built in 1739 and is a sign of Newmilns' prosperity during the handloom period. The townhouse steps led to the council chamber, and the side door (on the Main Street) led to the jail underneath. The town bell (housed in the belltower above the building) is engraved with the date 1547, predating the building below. At the far end of The Cross from the townhouse is the Browns Institute, which was given to Newmilns by Ms Martha Brown (of Lanfine) in 1872. Across the road stands the Loudoun Arms, which was built during the 18th century. To the east of The Cross can be found three adjacent buildings, the Commercial Inn, Morton Hall and Lady Flora's, which date to 1869, 1896 and 1875 respectively. Both Lady Flora's and the Commercial Inn have since been turned into housing, but have retained their original facade. The Morton Hall still serves as Newmilns' town hall, however with regionalisation in 1975, responsibility for the hall was transferred to Kilmarnock & Loudoun District Council (now East Ayrshire Council), taking it out of the hands of the Newmilns' townsfolk to whom it had been given.

Standing behind The Cross in Castle Street, The Keep (occasionally referred to as Newmilns Tower) is Newmilns' oldest building. The building dates from the 1530s and was probably built by Sir Hugh Campbell (not to be confused with either Hugh Campbell, 1st Lord Campbell of Loudoun or Hugh Campbell, 3rd Earl of Loudoun, who both lived much later). Over its history, The Keep has served many purposes, including being used as a barracks, prison, grain store, doocot, band hall and beer cellar. After falling into a state of disrepair for many years, it was restored in 1997 and now exists as housing.

On Brown Street at the Greenholm Bridge stands Lamlash House (formerly Bank House) an imposing red sandstone property of traditional Scots vernacular architecture which was built from 1888 to 1889 by Robert Carmichael Mitchell, the local Bank Agent and Match Manufacturer in Glasgow. The land on which the house sits was purchased from Ms Martha Brown of Lanfine Estate. In the entrance staircase of the house, there are 5 Stephen Adam designed stained glass windows which feature images of James Hogg, Sir Walter Scott, Allan Ramsay, Robert Tannahill and Robert Burns. Each of the windows contains a floral panel which links back to the image of Flora, the Roman Goddess of flowers and the season of spring. The property was Listed by Historic Scotland in 1992 and since 2006, has undergone a major programme of internal and external restoration works to ensure its longterm integrity.

Royal Bank of Scotland vacated the ground floor of the property in 2015 after over a century and a further programme of restoration has been carried out to reinstate the Victorian detailing which had been removed in the past. As part of the regeneration of Newmilns, the former Bank will be used for private events and functions.

=== Wildlife ===
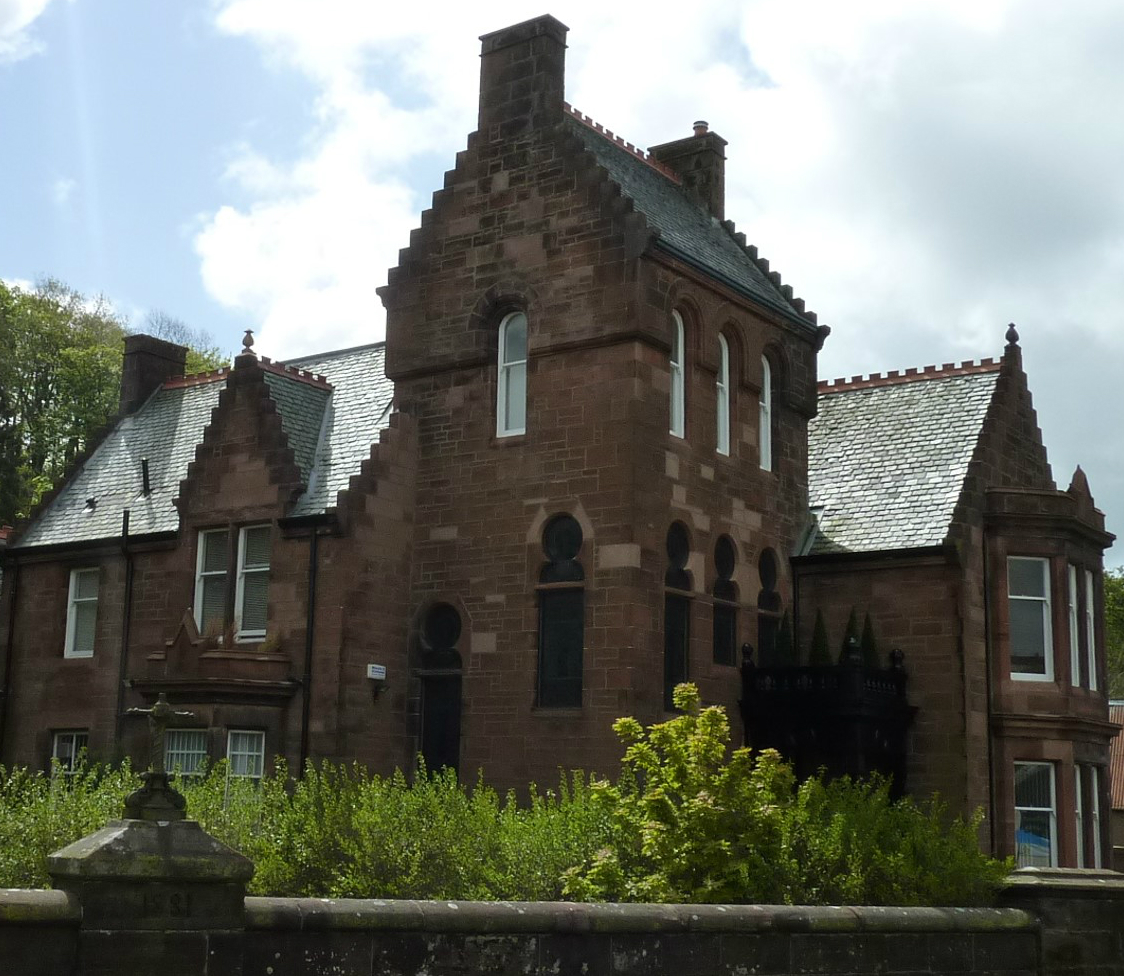
Lamlash House (Formerly Bank House) Newmilns

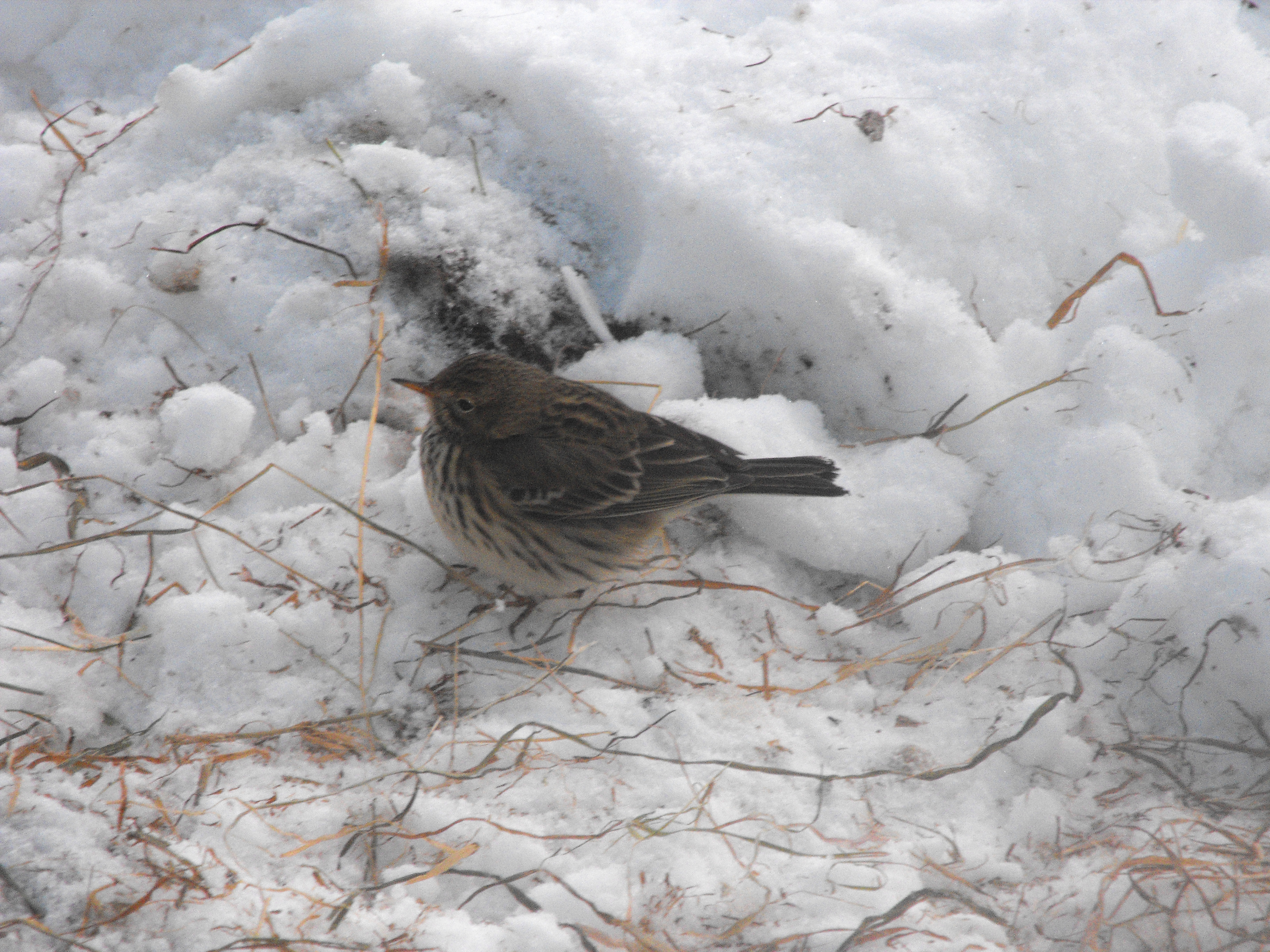
Mistle thrush in a snow-covered Downiesburn Park.

With its mix of agricultural, wooded, urban, and freshwater environments, Newmilns is home to a wide variety of wildlife. Notably, this includes a red squirrel population which has largely escaped the reduction of its numbers seen elsewhere in the country. Alongside squirrels more common mammals can be found, such as the badger, fox, deer, rabbit, hare, weasel, stoat, hedgehog and species of rats, mice, shrews and voles. The river provides home to minnows, salmon and trout; frogs, toads, bats and a large and varied insect population can be found nearby. To the west of Newmilns, local residents have sighted common kingfishers along the riverbank which, although elusive, are a popular aspect of the river's biodiversity.

Newmilns is also home to a large bird population. The Eurasian jackdaw is perhaps the most common resident and can be found nesting and feeding in buildings and gardens throughout the town. Accompanying the jackdaw are its close relatives, carrion crows and rooks (rooks are generally found on the outskirts of Newmilns) alongside a variety of other birds including the common swift, barn swallow, sparrowhawk, Eurasian wren, dunnock, robin, common starling, pied wagtail, spotted flycatcher, Eurasian magpie, dipper, oystercatcher, curlew, treecreeper, fieldfare, house sparrow, collared dove, woodpigeon, goose, common cuckoo, buzzard and multiple species of gull, duck, warbler, tit, thrush (notably the common blackbird) and finch. Grey herons are commonplace along the river and common kestrels are often found to the west of the town. Owls (generally tawny and barn) are also found in the area, although their numbers have reduced over the years.

=== Lammas Floods ===
On 18 October 1954, residents of Newmilns were shocked to witness an avalanche of "black debris-littered scum" make its way down Darvel Road before eventually settling at the East Strand. The black tide caused damage to homes and businesses across the east of Newmilns and prompted one factory owner, James Inglis, to sue the town council for damages. The town coup, which for eighteen years prior had been situated in a field above Darvel Road, had been washed downhill by severe rainfall and left much of Newmilns swamped in filth.

Many residents who witnessed this were reminded of the night of 10 August 1920, when severe rainfall caused the river to burst its banks in several places. The damage most notably occurred along the Main Street and Kilnholm Street, where the force of the river caused the adjacent stone wall to collapse (replaced by the current-day Red Wall) and caused the near-destruction of the Iron Brig (replaced by the current Iron Brig). It also caused great damage to the Henderson, Morton, Inglis & Co factory, which was built over the Norrel Burn. The high volume of water caused the lade to burst and consequently, the burn flooded the factory floor causing damage to both machinery and electricity cables.

These floods are extreme examples of a phenomenon known as the Lammas Floods. As the floods usually occur around August, it is likely the name derives from Lammas Day, which falls on 1 August. Since 1954, better planning, understanding of rainfall patterns and sturdier building has severely marginalised the impact of the Lammas Floods, however both 2007 and 2008 saw their return to Newmilns, when heavy rainfall caused burns north of the town to burst their banks and flow through the streets, again causing damage to homes and businesses across the town.

== Recreation ==
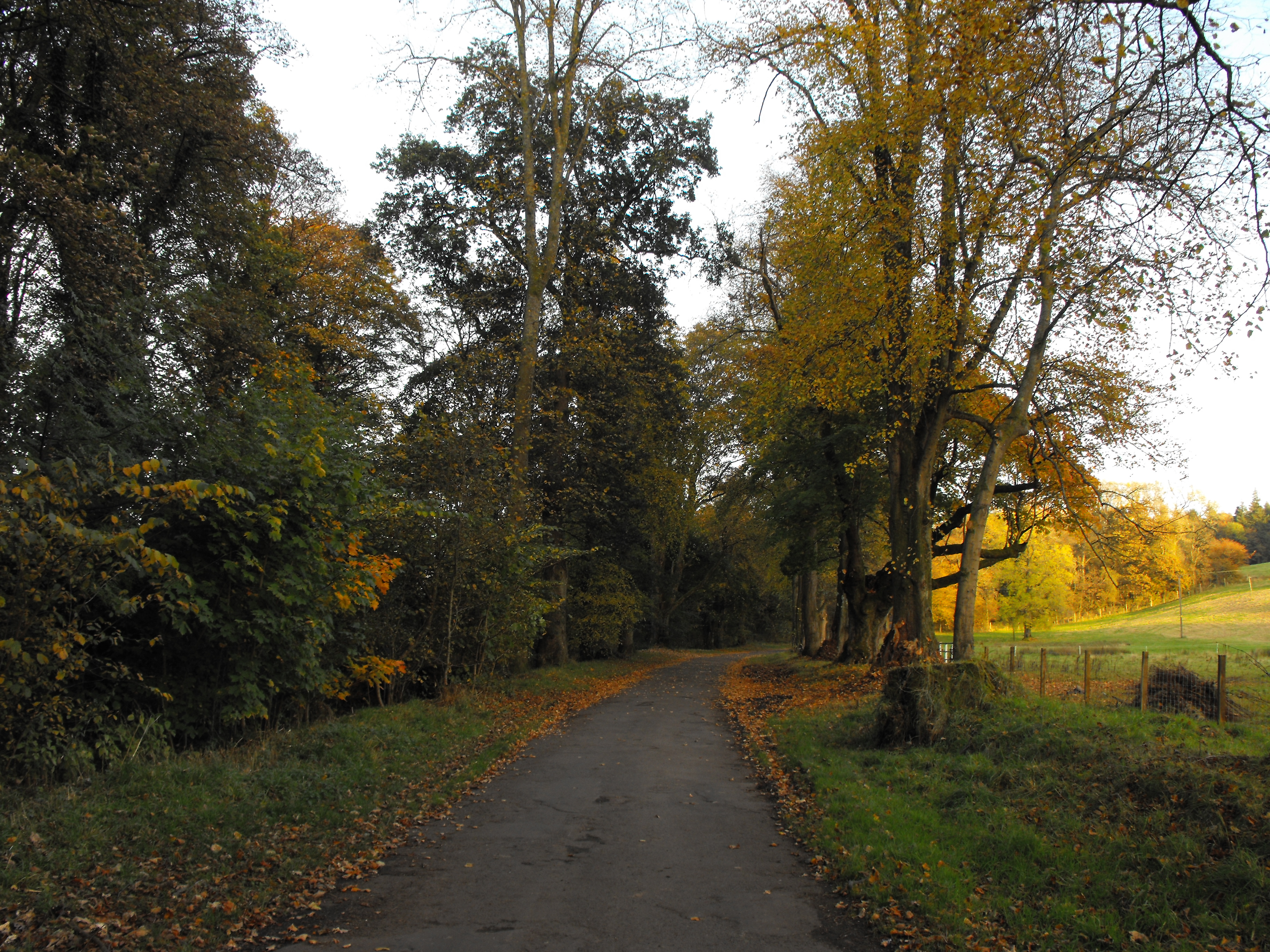
Walking is a popular Newmilns pastime. The Broons Road (seen here in autumn) is a popular destination throughout the year.

=== Popular Pastimes ===
Aside the usual array of clubs and organisations catering for different age ranges and interest groups, Newmilns is host to a variety of different sports, leisure & social pursuits including a bowling club, a dry ski slope and mountain-bike track, three public houses, an annual cattle show, a library and three public parks at Greenside, the Glebe and Gilfoot. Jamieson Park (Gilfoot) is also home to Newmilns' amateur football team, Newmilns Vesuvius AFC, who currently play in the Premier Division of the Ayrshire AFC.Vesuvius disbanded in 2008 but in 2022 Newmilns Greenholm AFC was founded by a group of locals. 'The holm' will begin playing in the Ayrshire Sunday Amateur League in 2023 and are sponsored by The Riverside Inn and the club badge incorporates the traditional red and white colours of previous clubs in the town.On August 13th Newmilns beat Lawthorn 2-0 in the clubs first ever league game.

=== Irvine Valley Walking Festival ===
2003 saw the commencement of the Irvine Valley Walking Festival. The 2003 festival was attended by 400 people and has since become an annual event, growing in size and stature over this time. The festival is based around the Irvine Valley Paths Network, which connects some 35 miles worth of disused railway line, rights of way and country roads around The Valley and nearby Hurlford. Participants are usually accompanied by guides, who impart their knowledge of local points of interest found along the way. The Irvine Valley Regeneration Partnership, which runs the event, is based in the townhouse at Newmilns Cross.

=== Gala Day ===
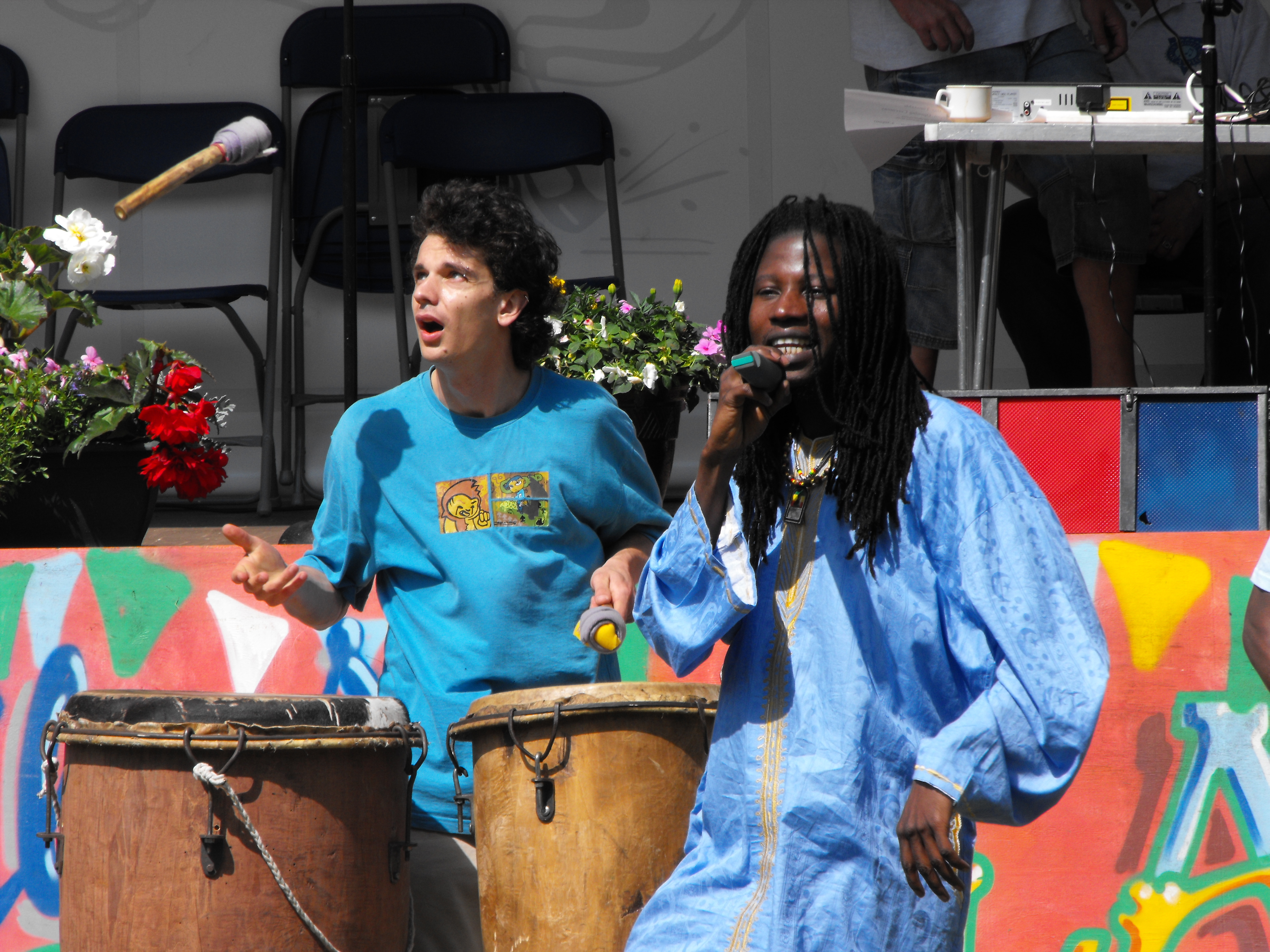
Band entertaining the crowd during the 2009 Gala Day

Like many towns, Newmilns holds an annual gala day. The day starts with a brass band-led parade, which includes representatives from local groups, businesses, organisations and members of the wider community. The parade assembles at Gilfoot and heads east along Loudoun Road, Kilnholm Street and the Main Street, before turning right onto Union Street and disbanding at Greenside Park (until recent years the parade followed the reverse of this route, assembling in Union Street and disbanding at the Jamieson Park).

The main event usually lasts throughout the afternoon and plays host to bands, battle reenactments, races, stalls and amusements such as tug-o-war and beat-the-goalie competitions, with the events of the afternoon culminating in the crowning of the gala queen. The gala day is viewed as an important event in Newmilns' social calendar as it brings together and caters for the whole community. The Newmilns Gala Committee, which organises the event, also holds fundraisers throughout the year, which again are viewed as important social events for similar reasons.

== Interesting facts ==
=== Age of Steam ===
The present-day Vesuvius site was originally a railway station. It was opened in 1850 and proved successful until around the 1930s, when passengers gradually switched to the local bus service. From then on, the railway mainly carried freight and mail. Despite remaining financially viable, Newmilns' railway service was axed during Richard Beeching's Reshaping of British Railways in the 1960s.

The area behind Newmilns Fire Station was formerly home to Loudoun Colliery, with a bogey line carrying coal from the colliery to the main railway. Subsequent housing development has rendered the bogey line undetectable, but the hump in the road outside the entrances to Gilfoot and Mason's Holm marks the spot where it crossed the A71. The road running up to Woodhead Farm is known locally as The Pit Brae, as it provided access to the colliery.

=== Anti-Slavery Society ===
In response to the American Civil War, the Newmilns Anti-Slavery Society was formed. After writing to the U.S. Government to declare their support for the anti-slavery cause, an appreciative Abraham Lincoln presented Newmilns with an American flag. The flag however was eventually lost, leading U.S. Consul, General Dayle C McDonough to present a new one during Newmilns' Civic Week celebrations in 1949.

=== The Battle of the Lime Road ===
The Lime Road, which is found on the western periphery of Newmilns, was once a popular walk for local residents. From 1878 to 1893, Baron Donington of Loudoun Castle erected barriers, in a bid to block walkers' access. Local residents took the case to court and eventually won, protecting the Lime Road's status as a public right-of-way. It is now recognised by the Irvine Valley Path Network, although certain barriers have been erected to block free access to Loudoun Castle Theme Park.

=== Robert Burns ===
In 1786, Robert Burns used the proceeds from his Kilmarnock Edition to book passage from Greenock to Jamaica, in the hope of making a better life for himself abroad. At this time he was relatively unknown in Scotland and was only dissuaded from leaving after receiving a letter from the Edinburgh-based poet, Thomas Blacklock. This letter arrived only days before Burns was due to leave, but succeeded in encouraging him to stay and publish more work (which also saved Burns' life, as the ship sank en route to the West Indies). Blacklock himself had only recently become aware of Burns, after receiving a copy of the Kilmarnock Edition from one Rev. George Lawrie, of Loudoun Manse.

Lawrie is known to have received Burns several times at the manse. In reference to this, Burns' brother Gilbert wrote, "This was a delightful family scene for our poet, then lately introduced to the world. His mind was roused to a poetic enthusiasm and the stanzas were left in the room where he slept." Alongside the stanza referred to, Burns also presented Lawrie's daughters with verses describing his visits to Loudoun Manse and on one window pane in the manse, scratched the following line with his diamond, "Lovely Mrs. Lawrie, she is all charms."

=== Football ===
Around the start of the 20th century, many local footballers went on to have successful careers in both the Scottish and English leagues. The best-remembered of these is perhaps Hugh Wilson, who in 1890 was capped for Scotland against Wales whilst playing for Newmilns Seniors. He not only won further caps for Scotland, but went on to win three English league titles with Sunderland in 1892, 1893 & 1895, before returning to Scotland to win the league & cup with Third Lanark in 1904 & 1905 respectively.

In 1891, local lace manufacturers, Johnstone Shields & Co, opened a factory in Gothenburg, using Newmilns employees to set up and run the site. Whilst in Gothenburg, the employees established a team, Örgryte Idrottsällskap and won Sweden's first ever football match. The employees went on to form another team, which eventually evolved into the world-renowned IFK Göteborg.

Two years later, Johnstone Shields set up a factory in Barcelona and again used their Newmilns workforce. The men from Newmilns set up another football team, Colonia Escocesa, which, according to local historians, contested the first ever Spanish cup final. This is slightly ambiguous, the first Copa del Rey final was contested between Club Vizcaya (later Athletic Club de Bilbao) and FC Barcelona. Records do show however that in 1900, Colonia Escocesa lost 2–0 to FC Barcelona, in a match recorded as Amistoso Internacional (Catalan for International Friendly). Whilst seemingly not part of an official tournament, it is quite possible that the participating players viewed the match as an international cup final, explaining why oral tradition remembers it as such.

At least one Newmilns man, George Girvan, went on to play for FC Barcelona before returning to Scotland. Such was Barca's immediate success, it is not unlikely that he and other Newmilns residents would have won silverware with the club.

=== Gowf ===
The site which occupies Loudoun Gowf Club was originally rented from the Earl of Loudoun in 1908. The rental was under the condition that were the club to close, the area should be returned to its pre-rental state. As the club was notoriously poor at turning a profit, it's believed it only survived because until 1947, it never had sufficient funds to return the area to its original condition.

=== Street Names ===
Over the years, various street name changes have taken place. High Street was originally divided into three parts, known from bottom to top as Doitburn Street, Grey Street & High Street. Nelson Street was similarly divided, known from west to east as North Devon Place, Waterwynd & Nelson Street. The area of the Main Street around the Brigend was known as West Strand. The East Strand was located at the gardens on the Main Street, opposite the Long Entry. Castle Street was originally New Road and Kilnholm Street led to an area known simply as The Wilderness. Loudoun Road West was known (locally at least) as the Toll Road and King Street was formerly known as Back Street. A sign on an entry-wall in Loudoun Road (at the corner of Shields Road) records the name Jeffrey Place, although it is uncertain what area this encompassed.

Names of streets have changed, but one area of Greenholm has all but disappeared. Stewarts Place occupied the area between Browns Road and the Tilework Brae and was built to accommodate navvies brought to Newmilns for the purpose of extending the railway line to Darvel. Stewarts Place gradually fell into disrepair and became locally known as Bedlam, due to this. Remnants of the buildings still stand, but lie behind a large, stone wall and as such are largely unnoticed by local residents.

Gilfoot was built from 1936 to 1939 and was pragmatically fitted out with electric street lighting. Initially, the street lights were not connected to an electricity supply, so gas lights were hung from lamp-posts until electrification could take place. The sight of this gave the area an eastern feel, leading local residents to refer to Gilfoot as Shanghai. Although the name is not in common use today, it persisted for many years after the gas lights were removed.

== See also ==
- Castle and Lands of Auchruglen – A Nesbitt and Campbell keep located near the Auchruglin Glen at Crosstree Farm.
