= Galston =

Galston may refer to:

== Places ==
- Galston, East Ayrshire, a town near Kilmarnock in Scotland, United Kingdom
  - Galston parish, a civil parish
- Galston, New South Wales, a town near Sydney in Australia

== People ==
- Arthur Galston (1920–2008), American botanist and bioethicist
- William Galston (born 1946), American philosopher and politician
