= Castle and Lands of Auchruglen =

Scottish castle

Auchruglen Castle
- Newmilns, East Ayrshire, Scotland
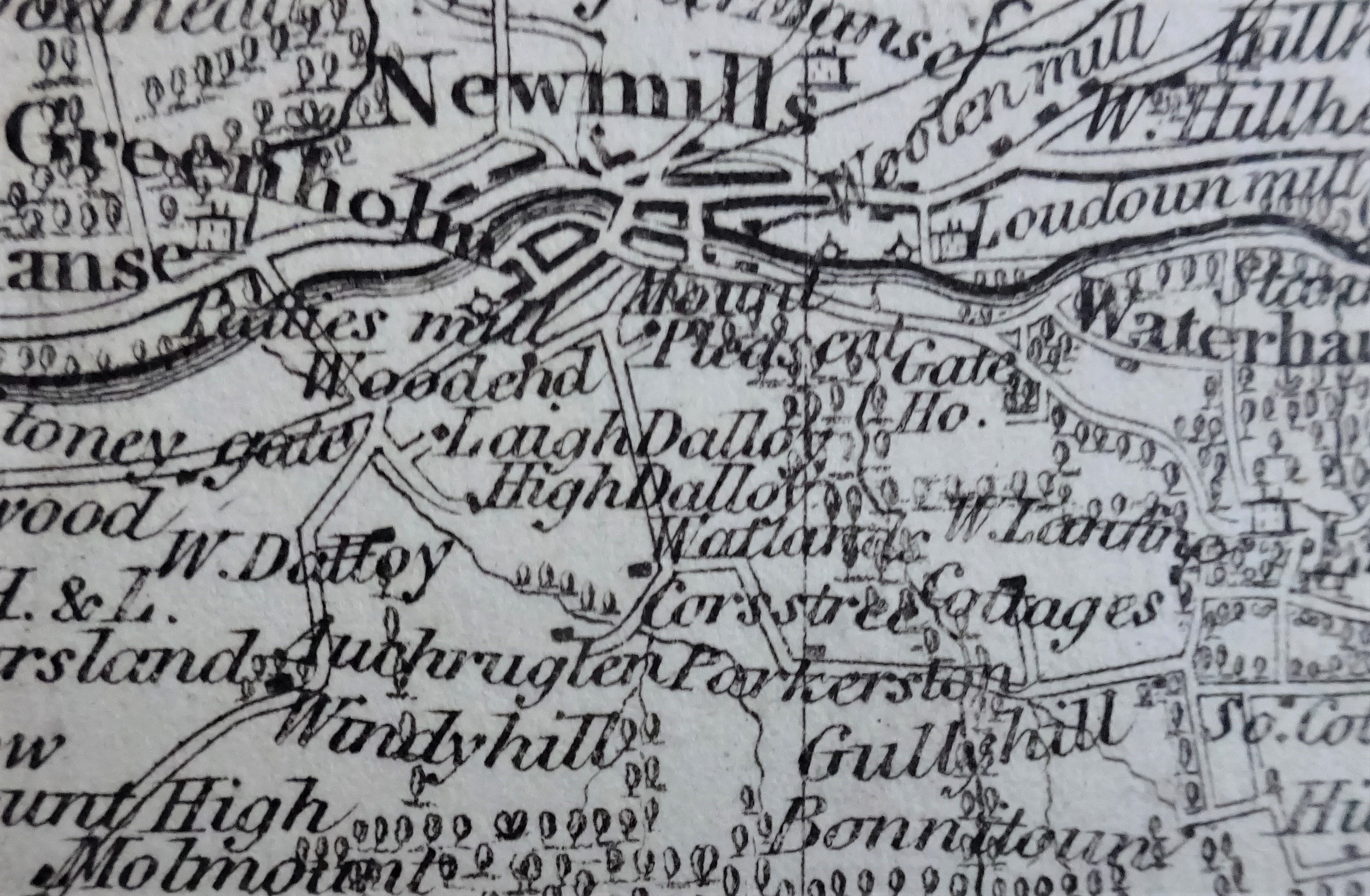
- Auchruglen on an 1828 Map

Site information
- Type: Tower
- Owner: Private
- Controlled by: Clan Nesbitt and Clan Campbell
- Open to the public: No
- Condition: Demolished

Location
- Location within East Ayrshire
- Coordinates: 55.602718°N 4.3244500°W
- Grid reference: grid reference NS5365436797

Site history
- Built: 16th century
- Materials: Stone

The Castle and Lands of Auchruglen (NS5365436797) was a peel tower in the old district of Kyle held at different times by the Nesbitt and Campbell Clans and located near Newmilns, Parish of Galston, East Ayrshire, Scotland.

== History ==
A wide variety of alternative spellings of the castle's name are recorded, such as Achruglen, Auchenruglane, Achinruglan, and Achinrugglan, John Smith's survey of sites states that Auchruglen Tower was located in the Galston district, held by the Kennedy's, but its exact site is uncertain.

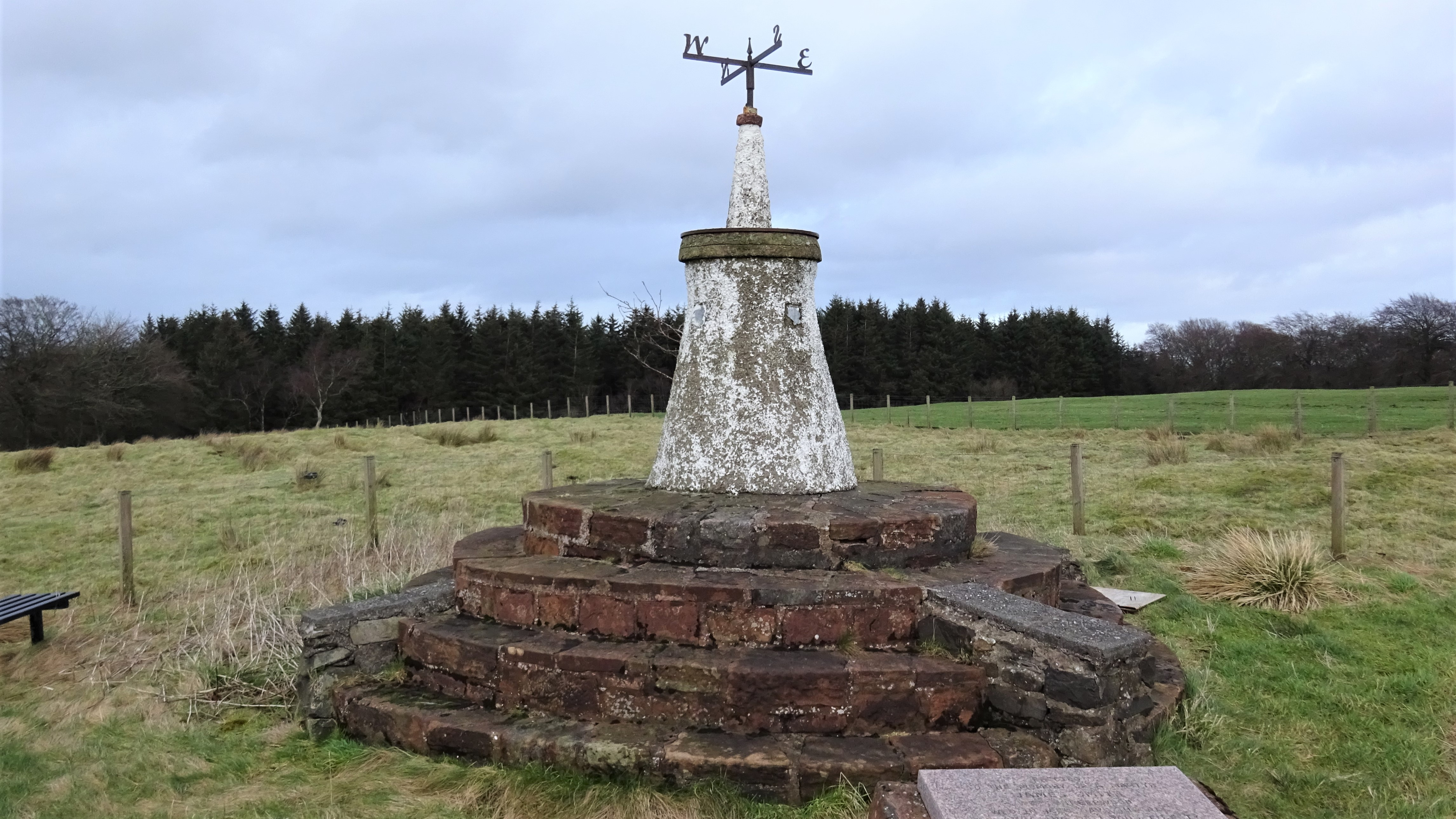
Gallow Law Covenanter Memorial

In 1775 the castle is not recorded on Andrew Armstrong's map however an 'Auchen' is marked. James Paterson recorded that Archruglen was an old tower, the remains of which were still visible and well known in 1866, located on a steep eminence on the banks of the River Irvine. James Paterson states that the castle was a property of the Campbells of Loudoun, but not their principal residence. Craufuird Loudoun states that Auchruglen was a square peel tower that lay between High Dalloy and Crosstrees Farms and had been built around 1527, not as a formidable fortress, but as a keep, a place of refuge, built for the purposes of protection and shelter under the circumstances of a sudden emergency.

In 1846 it was stated that the ruins of the castle were still pointed out by locals.

Gallow Law Cairn lies above the castle's location and it is said to have been the site of a barony court hangings in feudal times. A Gallow Hill Cairn in 1926 was built by local miners to the memory of the Covenanter James Smith of Threepwood, who died for civil and religious liberty in 1684.

=== Lairds and tenants of Auchruglen ===
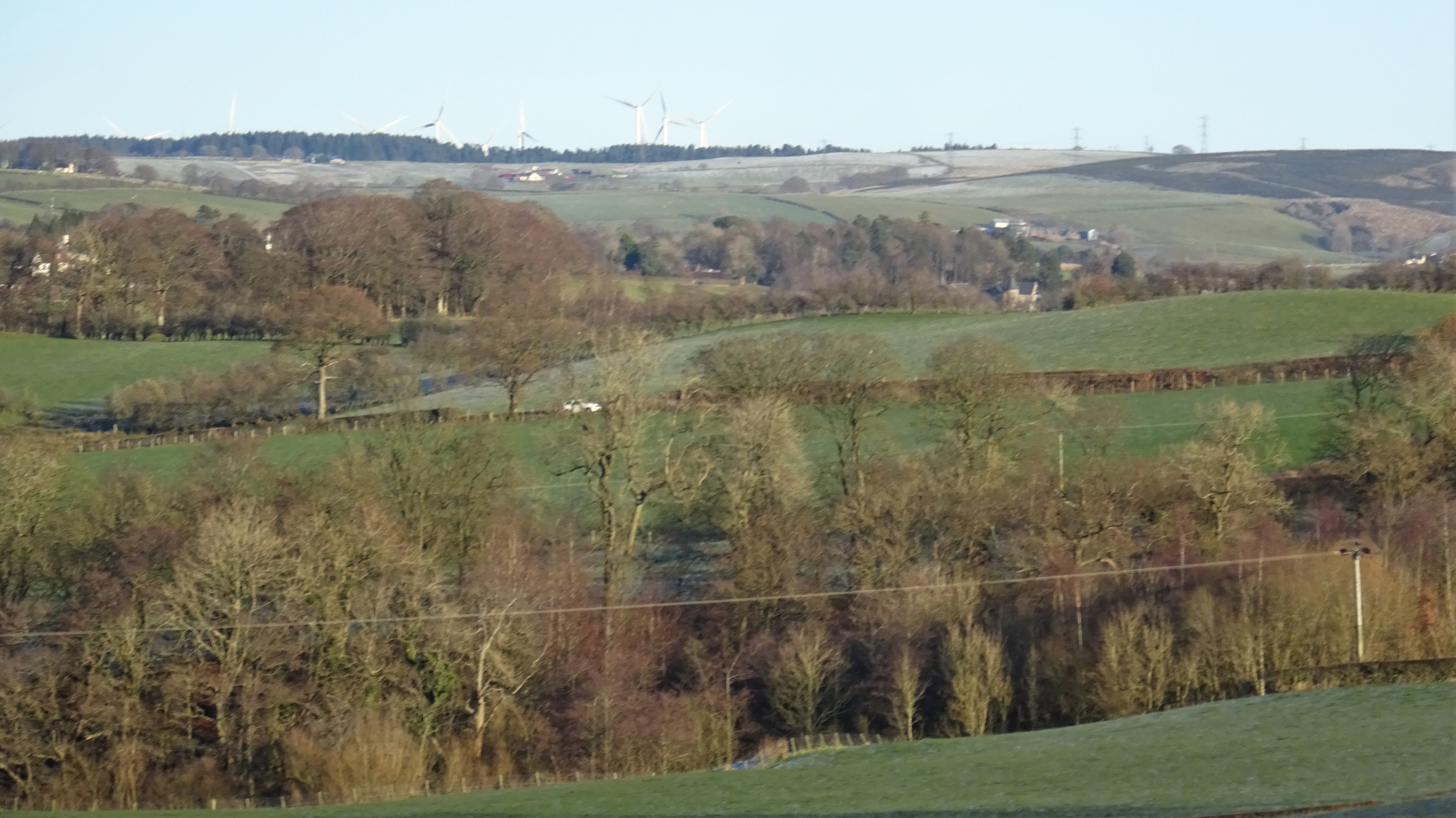
Possible site of Auchruglen Castle on the highest point to the right, above the glen and Crosstrees Farm

It is not clear whether a Barony of Auchruglen existed. The property lay in Kyle which although associated with lowland clans such as the Kennedys was at the time also a stronghold of the Campbells. James Nesbit (1457 to 1514) was granted sasine of Greenholm near Newmilns, Auchenruglane and Sorn as heir to his father in 1496. In 1607 Margaret Nisbet daughter of Alexander Nisbet of Greenholm was the spouse of Hugh Campbell of Auchruglen. In 1607 Elizabeth Gordon was the wife of Matthew Campbell of Batreshill and Hew Campbell of Auchruglen was their eldest son. In 1578 Mariota Nisbet and her mother were heir portioner who had in 1553 sold Auchinrugland to Hugh Campbell. The 40s lands of Auchinruglane during the years 1536 up to 1550 were in the care of whoever had the wardship of the two Nisbet daughters. Margaret Donald was born in Auchruglen on 8 Dec 1774 to Mary Millar.

A John Campbell of 'Newmilns' was taken with several 'Lollards of Kyle', mostly minor lairds, to trial as a Lollard, the earliest Scottish Protestants, and was executed. It is not clear if he was a Campbell of Auchruglen.

Nicol Brown Esq held the £100 land of Auchruglen in 1803 after the death of John Brown (1729-1802), as recorded in the Land Tax Rolls.

=== Burning of Auchruglen Castle ===
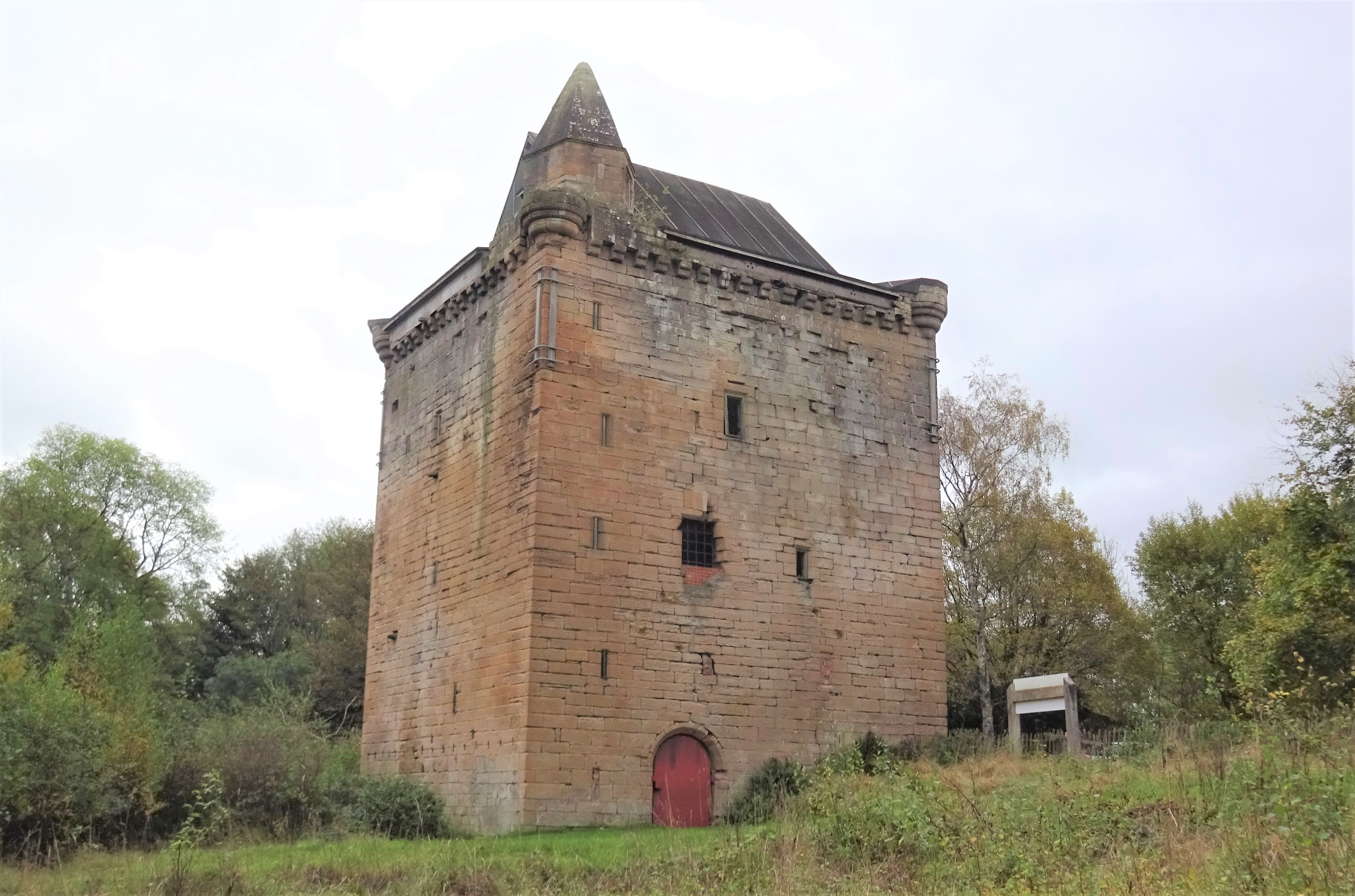
Sauchie, a typical Scottish Tower Castle

Paterson states that the Kennedys destroyed Auchruglen Castle in revenge for the murder of the Earl of Cassilis at Prestwick in 1527 by Hugh Campbell of Loudoun and his followers. The Kennedys made repeated forays into Campbell lands, however no record of the destruction of the castle has been found in the criminal records of the time. Many versions exist of the ballad of 'Adam of Gordon and his Men' regarding the 1571 burning of Towie Castle first published by Lord Hailes. One version, long known in the district, refers to the burning of Loudoun Castle. In past times wandering minstrels would alter ballads to fit in with incidents at locations they were visiting. Craufuird Loudoun considered that the burning of Lady Loudoun and her children took place at the 'Auld Place' otherwise known as Arclowdun Castle on the Hag Burn near the existing Loudoun Castle.

William Robertson recorded that local tradition was that the Campbell's keep of 'Achruglen' was burned, together with Lady Loudoun and her children who the Kennedy's had discovered to be at this keep rather than at Loudoun Castle itself. The Scottish Statistical Account of 1845 relates that Achruglen Tower was burned by the Kennedys.

The writer of the 1845 Statistical Account states that the old castle is supposed to have been destroyed by fire about 350 years before, making the event in around 1500.

Edom o Gordon or Adam of Gordon

"It was in and about the Martinmas time,
When the wind blew schill and cauld,
That Adam o Gordon said to his men,
Whare will we get a hauld?

'Do ye not see yon bonnie castell,
That stands on Loudon lee?
The lord and I hae a deadlie feed,
And his lady fain wuld I see.

Lady Campbell was standing in the close,
A preenin o her goun,
Whan Adam o Gordon and his men
Cam riding thro Galston toun.

The dinner was na weel set doun,
Nor yet the grace weel said,
Till Adam o Gordon and a' his men
Around the wa's war laid.

'Come doun, come down, Ladie Campbell,' he said,
'Come doun and speak to me;
I'll kep thee in a feather bed,
And thy warraner I will be.

'I winna come doun and speak to thee,
Nor to ony lord nor loun;
Nor yet to thee, thou bloody butcher,
The laird o Auchruglen toun.

'Come doun, come doun, Ladye Campbell,' he said,
'Cum doun and speak to me;
I'll kep thee on the point o my sword,
And thy warraner I will be.

'I winna come doun and speak to thee,
Nor to ony lord or loun,
Nor yet to thee, thou bludie butcher,
The laird o Auchruglen toun."

This section of a version of the old ballad implies that the attacker was the Laird of Auchruglen.

=== Auchruglin ===
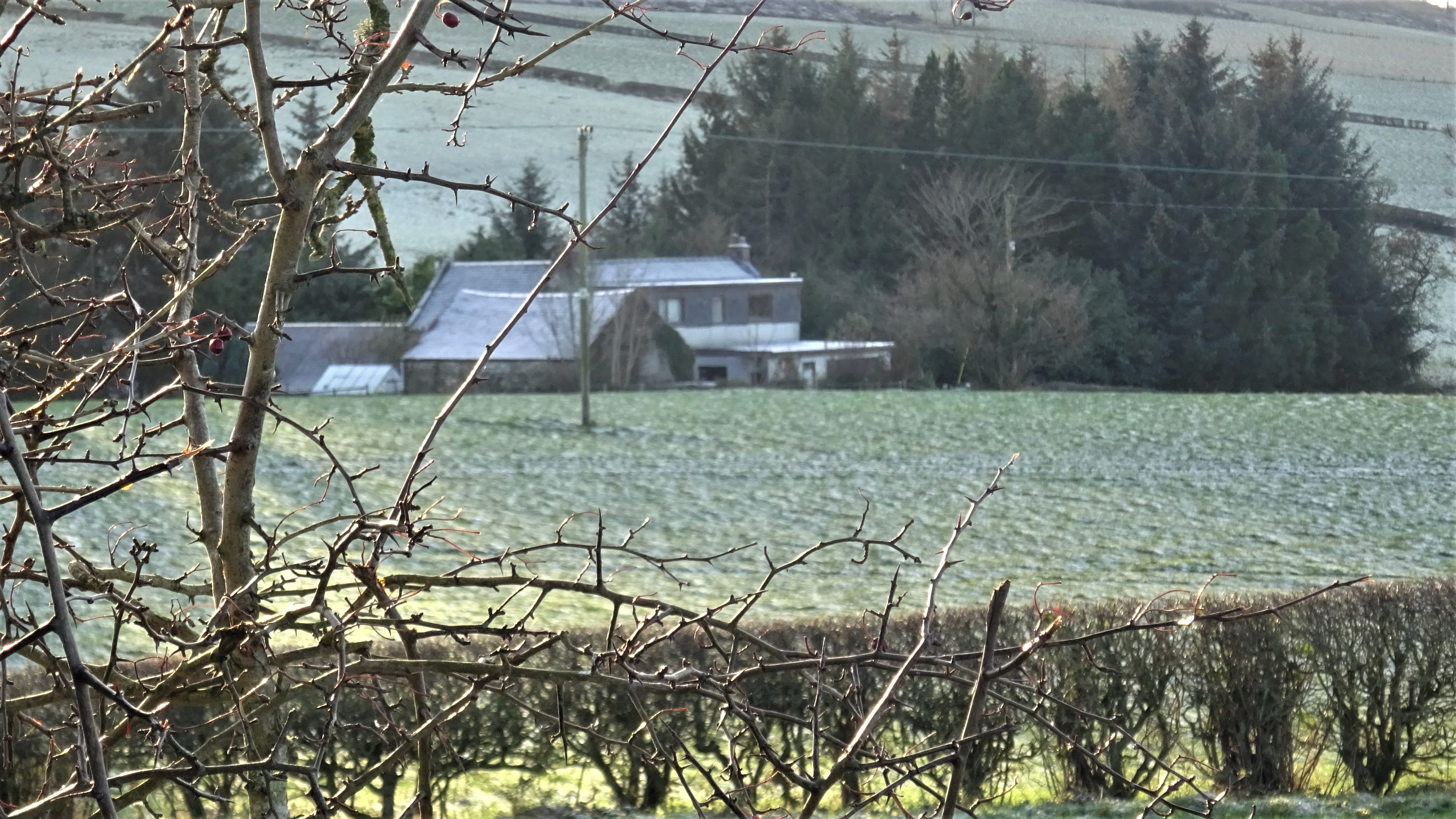
Crosstrees Farm and the Auchruglin Glen

A dwelling, rather than a castle, 'Auchruglen' is shown between Windyhill and Corsstree, later Crosstree on John Thomson's map of 1832 The location does not appear to match with the description of the tower as being on an eminence. The 1843-1882 OS map records a dwelling, Auchruglin, located close to the Auchruglin Glen (NS534363) on the west side of the burn. A footbridge over the burn connects this property to farms in the district, such as High Dalloy. By 1895 this property was abandoned, but still named and had been linked by a lane to Crosstrees. Thomas Gebbie of Auchruglen had a single horse recorded in the Farm Tax Rolls 1797–1798. Scotlands Places records Auchruglen was a Cottage, rather than a farm, occupied by a Hugh McInnes and in 1855-57 was the Property of Thomas Brown Esqr Lanfine.

The Auchruglin Burn rises East of the Trig [Trigonometrical] Station on Gallow law and flows passed Auchruglin High and Laigh Dalloy before having its confluence with the Irvine Water.

== Cartographic evidence ==
Gordon's map of 1636-52 shows an Achinruglan Castle The castle is clearly indicated on an eminence in the old district of Kyle, a short distance from the River Irvine. Timothy Pont and Joan Blaeu's map of 1560-1614 clearly shows the castle of Achinrugglan on the east bank of then Achinrugglan Burn above Dalluy, now Dalloy Farm. Achinrugglan is recorded below Momout, now Molmont Hill and to the east of a water course, on Herman Moll's Ayrshire map of 1745 William Roys 1750s map does not show the castle. An 'Auchen' is marked on the Andrew Armstrong map of 1775. Later maps do not indicate a castle or tower however an 'Auchruglen' is shown between Windyhill and Corsstree, later Crosstree on John Thomson's map of 1832. Lidar mapping suggests a structure close to Mount Pleasant and Crosstrees Farms.

== Historical timeline ==
1496 - James Nesbit (1457 to 1514) was granted sasine of Greenholm, Auchenruglane and Sorn as heir to his father.

1527 circa - The Kennedys are by tradition said to have destroyed Auchruglen Castle by burning in revenge for the murder of the Earl of Cassilis at Prestwick.

1536 to 1550 - The 40s lands of Auchinruglane were in the care of whoever had the wardship of the two Nisbet daughters.

1553 - Mariota Nisbet and her mother had in 1553 sold Auchinrugland to Hugh Campbell.

1607 - Margaret Nisbet daughter of Alexander Nisbet of Greenholm was the spouse of Hugh Campbell of Auchruglen.

1607 - Elizabeth Gordon was the wife of Matthew Campbell of Batreshill and Hew Campbell of Auchruglen was their eldest son.

1636-52 - Gordon's map of 1636-52 records the location of an Achinruglan Castle.

1560-1614 - Timothy Pont and Joan Blaeu's map clearly shows the castle of Achinrugglan on the east bank of then Achinrugglan Burn above Dalloy Farm.

1745 - Achinrugglan is recorded below Molmont Hill and to the east of a water course, on Herman Moll's Ayrshire map. This is the last clear recording of a castle of that name.

1774 - Margaret Donald was born in Auchruglen on 8 December to Mary Millar.

1775 - An 'Auchen' is marked on the Andrew Armstrong map on the west side of the Auchruglin Burn.

1797-1798 - Thomas Gebbie of Auchruglen had a single horse recorded in the Farm Tax Rolls.

1803 - Nicol Brown Esq held the £100 land of Auchruglen after the death of John Brown (1729-1802).

1832 - A dwelling, rather than a castle, 'Auchruglen' is shown between Windyhill and Crosstree farms, later Crosstree on John Thomson's map.

1845 - The Statistical Account states that the old castle is supposed to have been destroyed by fire about 350 years before, making the event in around 1500.

1843-1882 - The first OS map records a dwelling, Auchruglin, located close to the Auchruglin Glen (NS534363) on the west side of the burn.

1855-1857 - Auchruglen was a Cottage, rather than a farm, occupied by a Hugh McInnes and was the Property of Thomas Brown Esqr Lanfine.

1895 - The Auchruglin property was abandoned, but still named and had been linked by a lane to Crosstrees.
