= A Glasgow Bible =

Scots paraphrase of the Bible

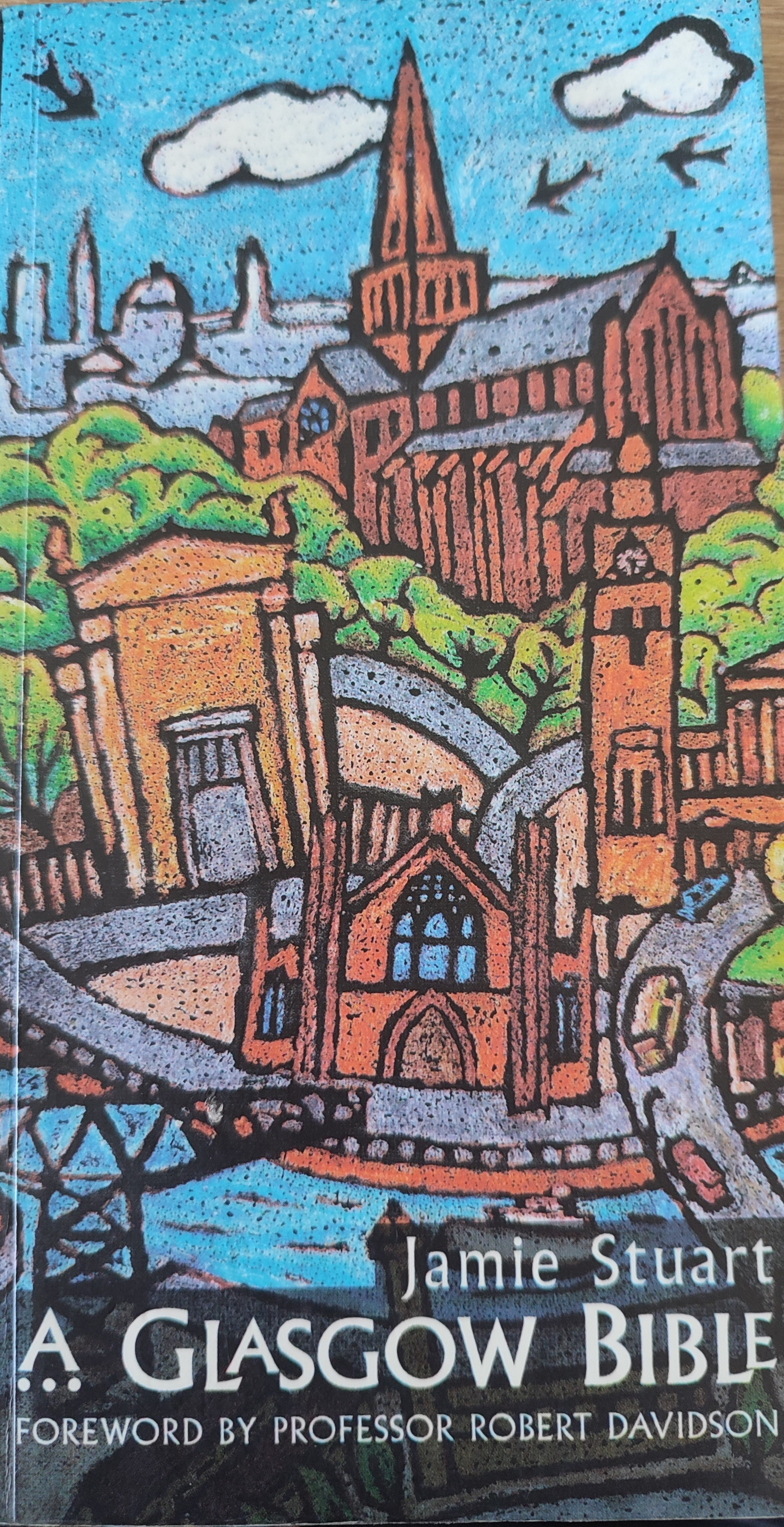
- Full name: A Glasgow Bible
- Abbreviation: Glasgow
- Language: Scots
- Publisher: Saint Andrew Press
- Copyright: 1997 by Jamie Stuart
- Genesis 1:1–3 It wis a lang time ago, right enough – thoosans an thoosans o years since. There wis nuthin whaur the earth is the noo – absolutely nuthin at aw. 'Weel noo,' God says tae himsel wan day, 'I'll fix a wee bit dod o land – doon there.' So, tae stert wi, God ordered up some light tae brek oot ower aw the darkness.

A Glasgow Bible is a Scots paraphrase of selected passages of the Bible by Jamie Stuart (1920–2016) in the Glaswegian dialect.

In 1981, Stuart visited the Edinburgh Festival to see Alec McGowan, who had memorised the whole of the Gospel of Mark in the Authorised Version. It caused Stuart to ponder about translating the gospel into Scots. Over the next two years, the four Gospels were combined into a one-man play titled 'A Scots Gospel in the Guid Scots Tongue', which toured around churches and halls in Scotland, Canada and New York state.

This encouraged others to invite him to publish it into a book. The original book was called 'The Glasgow Gospel', published in 1992. The copies sold out within hours of their publication, and went top of the Scottish bestsellers' chart. In the following years, he followed the success of 'The Glasgow Gospel' with two books of 'Auld Testament Tales' (in which David challenges Goliath with "Weel, come oan then, ya big scrawny plook!"). In 1997, both books were combined into a single volume called A Glasgow Bible.

A Glasgow Bible ran into several editions, and was also issues as a bestselling DVD featuring actors such as Tony Roper, Andy Cameron and Johnny Beattie and the Govan-born Manchester United manager Sir Alex Ferguson.

His other books include Proverbs in the Patter, a Glasgow dialect version of the Book of Proverbs, which includes such pearls of wisdom as: "The lazy lout (is) a pain in the behouchie tae the honest folk wha hiv tae thole him" and "The bevvy-drinker isnae clever: it’s daft tae get fu wi the hard stuff."

In 2014 he published his autobiography, Still Running.
