= Newmilns Tower =

Fortification in the Parish of Ochiltree, East Ayrshire, Scotland

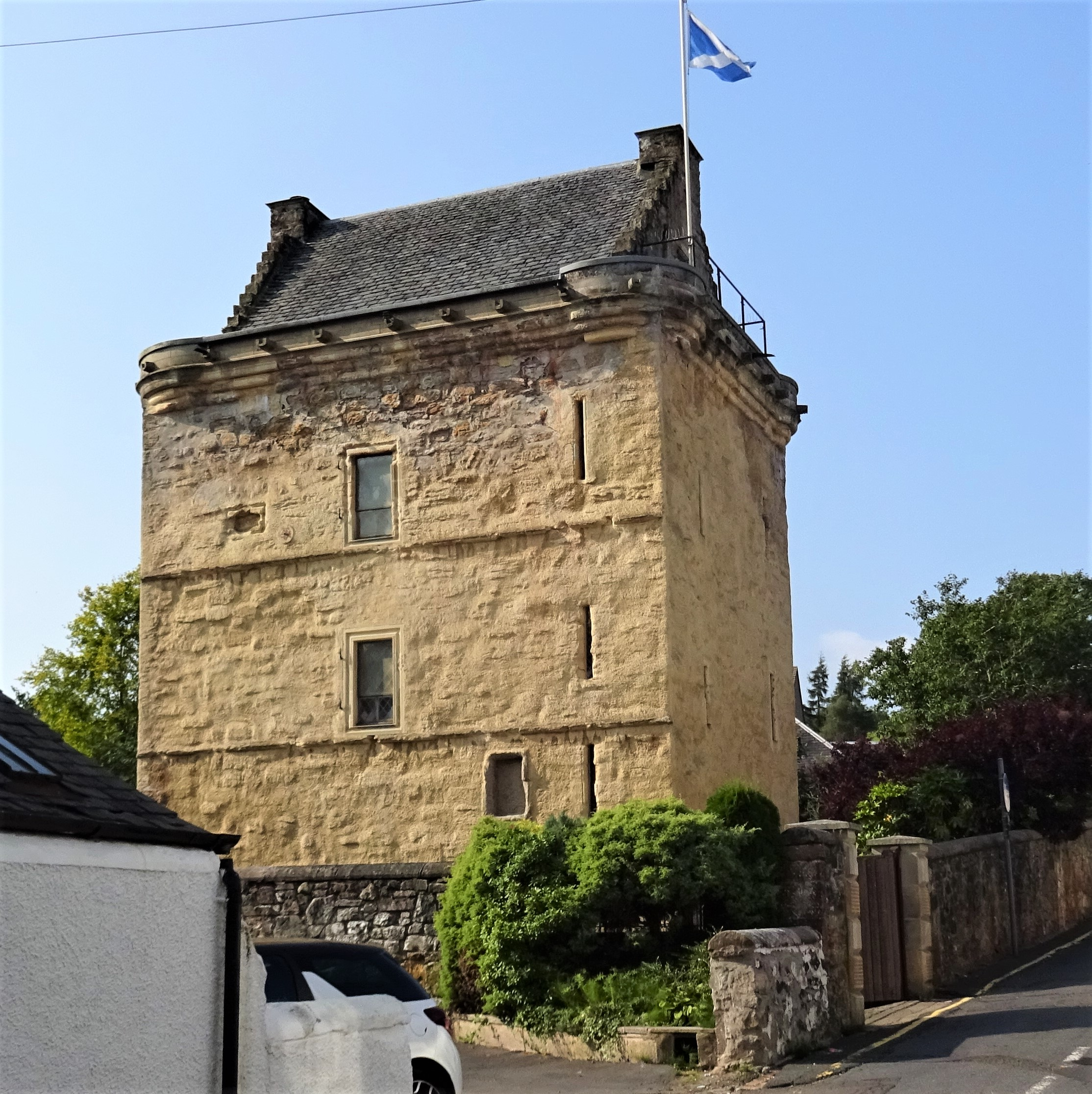
- Newmilns Tower, Newmilns, East Ayrshire

Site information
- Condition: ruined

Location
- Coordinates: 55.6077240°N 4.3249209°W

Newmilns Tower is a 16th-century tower house, on Main Street, Newmilns, north of the River Irvine, East Ayrshire, Scotland. It may also be called Newmilns Castle or Ducat Tower.

== History ==
The Campbells of Loudon owned the castle, Sir Hugo Campbell owned it in 1530. It may also be called Newmilns Castle or Ducat Tower Covenanters were imprisoned there in the 17th century, but a Covenantor force captured the tower, although their leader, John Low died in the attack. His gravestone is in the wall round the castle.

== Structure ==
Newmilns Tower is a rectangular tower house, measuring 30 by 24 feet (9.1 m × 7.3 m), with walls 5 feet (1.5 m) thick, having three storeys and an attic. There is a parapet. The corners are topped by corbelled-out rounds. It has a chamber in each floor, and a vaulted basement. The entrance is at ground level, protected by a heavy, double-planked, oak door, once secured by three oak drawbars with drawbar slots. The great hall was on the first floor; it has an open fireplace, a garderobe in the north wall, a large window in a recess in the south wall, defensive slit windows in the east and west walls, and two aumbries. Some iron bars inserted into the windows, and two cell doors with heavy locks, from the time when this floor was used as a prison divided into cells. remain in the building. There is a wheel-stair in the southeast angle.An iron yett protected upper floors. There would have been a surrounding wall. Timothy Pont recorded the tower as “surrounded by orchards, gardens and pleasances”.

== See also ==
- Castles in Great Britain and Ireland
- List of castles in Scotland
