= Murdoch Nisbet =

Scottish notary and bible translator (died 1559)

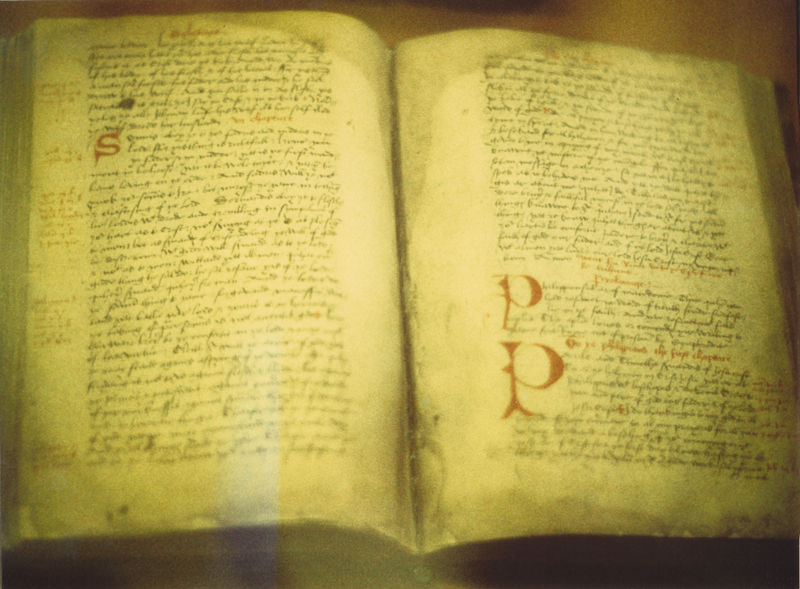
Murdock Nisbet's translation of the New Testament. British Museum, photo taken in 1975.

Murdoch Nisbet (died 1559) was a Scottish notary public in the diocese of Glasgow who created one of the earliest Bible translations into Scots. Living in the parish of Loudoun, Ayrshire, Nisbet's work as a notary public brought him into contact with local religious dissidents. He participated in a conventicle where he illicitly conducted readings of his translation. In 1539, Nisbet "digged and built a Vault in the Bottom of his own House" to hide his New Testament manuscript and conventicle activities.

Murdoch Nisbet was of the Hardhill Farm, Parish of Loudon, Ayrshire, Scotland. He was an early member of the Nisbet's of Greenholm, living near Newmilns, along the Irvine River. He joined the Lollards (early English Protestants) who followed the teachings of Wycliffe: Wycliffe and his assistants translated the Latin Bible into English about 1384. One of those assistants was John Purvey who revised Wycliffe's Bible about 1395. Murdoch Nisbet obtained a copy of Purvey's revision and began translating the New Testament into Scots, the indigenous lowland language derived from northern Middle English. It took Murdoch about 20 years to manually transcribe the New Testament and his work was passed on in the Nisbet of Greenholm family for 200 years.

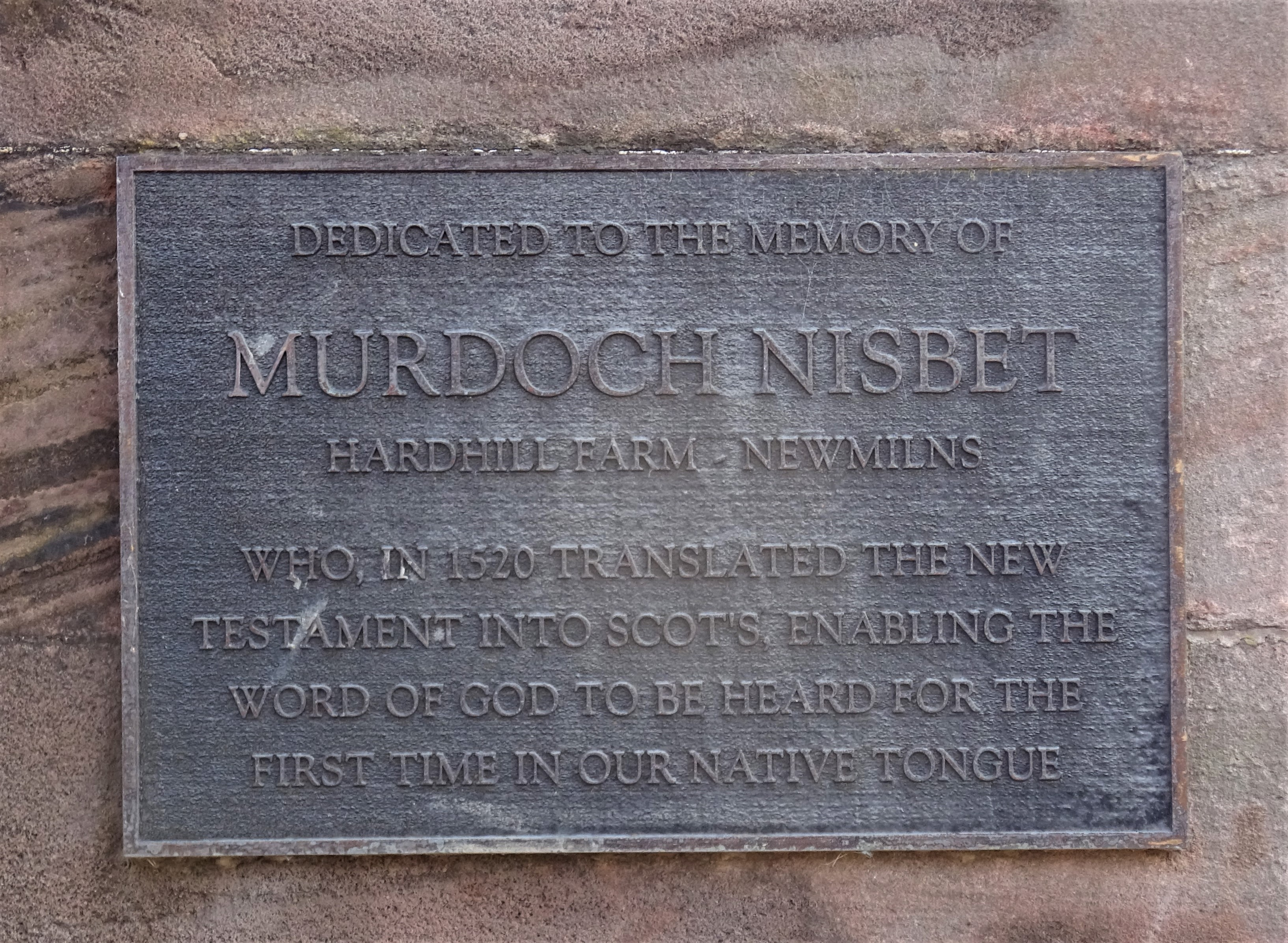
Memorial to Murdoch Nisbet at Loudoun Parish Church.

Possessing a layman's version of the Bible was punishable by imprisonment or death, and Murdoch's manuscript was passed in secret within the family at Hardhill. John Nisbet the martyr gave it to his son James Nisbet who was a Sergeant at Arms at the Edinburgh Castle. Sergeant James Nisbet gave Murdoch's manuscript to Sir Alexander Boswell who kept it in his library at Auchinleck. The manuscript was held for a nephew, but he proved unreliable and sold it. Alexander Boswell immediately bought it back and it was kept in his library for 150 years until 1893. Lord Amherst of Hackney placed it at the service of the Scottish Text Society for publication about 1900. Murdoch's original manuscript is now in the British Museum of Rare Books and Manuscripts, where it is found on display in the Bible Room opened in 1938.

One of Nisbet's descendants was the covenanter martyr, John Nisbet.

== See also ==
- Covenanter
- Diocese of Glasgow and Galloway
- Archdiocese of Glasgow
