= Scottish Text Society =

- Founded: 1882
- Country of origin: United Kingdom
- Headquarters location: Edinburgh
- Distribution: Boydell & Brewer
- Publication types: Books
- Nonfiction topics: Historic texts
- Official website: www.scottishtextsociety.org

The Scottish Text Society (STS) is a text publication society founded in 1882 to promote the study of Scottish literature. The Society publishes scholarly editions of important texts from the country's literary history, and has played a significant role in the revival of interest in the literature and languages of Scotland.

To date, the Society has published approximately 150 volumes, from the 14th to the 19th centuries, but with a focus on Middle Scots works of the 16th to 18th centuries. These editions include poetry, drama and prose works.

Professor Sally Mapstone Principal and Vice-Chancellor of the University of St Andrews is Honorary President of the Society.

== Notable publications ==
- The Brus, by John Barbour
- The Actes and Deidis of the Illustre and Vallyeant Campioun Schir William Wallace, by Blind Hary
- The Buke of the Law of Armys, by Gilbert Hay
- The Shorter Poems of Gavin Douglas
- Virgil's Aeneid, Translated into Scottish Verse by Gavin Douglas, Bishop of Dunkeld
- The works of Alexander Montgomerie
- History of the House of Angus, by David Hume
- The Complaynt of Scotland
- The New Testament in Scots, by Murdoch Nisbet.

In 2014, the Society launched a new publication of the original poem Buke of the Howlat.

== See also ==
- Scottish Gaelic Texts Society
