= Gordon Hay =

Scottish author and translator

Gordon McKenzie Hay MBE (born 1952 or 1953) is a Scottish author, translator and former solicitor who has translated a range of works into the Doric dialect of the Scots language. He is best known for writing the first complete translation of the Bible into Scots.

== Early life ==
Gordon McKenzie Hay was born in 1952 or 1953 and raised in Inverkeithny in the historic county of Banffshire. He attended Inverkeithny Parish Church which was then part of the Church of Scotland and his passion for Doric was inspired by Charles Murray's poem "It wisna his Wyte", which he performed at a school concert.

== Career ==
Hay was a solicitor when he started working on a Doric translation of the New Testament in 2006, finishing and publishing it in 2012. He then began working on a translation of the Old Testament, retiring as a solicitor during this time and publishing it in 2023. While parts of the Bible had previously been translated into Scots, Hay's translation is the first to cover it completely. He was invited by Jackie Dunbar, the MSP for Aberdeen Donside, to appear at the Scottish Parliament's Time for Reflection to read parts of the translation.

In 2021, Hay published a compilation of nursery rhymes titled Doric Nursery Rhymes for Loons & Quines which subsequently won the 2022 Bairns' Beuk o the Year from the Scots Language Awards. Other works he has translated include Peter and the Wolf and parts of The Pickwick Papers and George Frederic Handel's Messiah.

Hay was appointed a Member of the Most Excellent Order of the British Empire as part of the 2025 New Year Honours.

== Personal life ==
Hay has 3 children and 4 grandchildren. He is an elder of the Church of Scotland, a church organist and the choirmaster at Longside Parish Church.

== Bibliography ==
- The Doric New Testament (2012)
- Doric Nursery Rhymes for Loons & Quines (2021)
- The Doric Aul Testament (2023)
