= Scottish Gaelic Texts Society =

Scottish Gaelic Texts Society logo

The Scottish Gaelic Texts Society is a text publication society established "to provide the publication of texts in the Scottish Gaelic language, accompanied by such introductions, English translations, glossaries and notes as may be deemed desirable." It was established in April 1934.

"The Society’s publications have focused primarily on poetry, as might be expected, but its catalogue also includes significant work in Gaelic prose. While early emphasis was often on texts from the sixteenth to eighteenth centuries, SGTS editions increasingly reflect the richness of nineteenth- and twentieth-century Gaelic literature, including both oral and written traditions."

As of 2026, the Society has published 32 volumes.

== Publications ==
- Scottish Verse from the Book of the Dean of Lismore, edited by Professor William J. Watson. 1937.
- The Songs of John MacCodrum, bard to Sir James MacDonald of Sleat, edited by William Matheson. 1938.
- Heroic Poetry from the Book of the Dean of Lismore, edited by Neil Ross. 1939.
- The Songs of Duncan Ban MacIntyre, edited by Angus MacLeod. 1952. 1978.
- Prose writings of Donald MacKinnon 1839-1914, edited by Lachlan Mackinnon. 1956.
- The Prose Writings of Donald Lamont 1874-1958, edited by Thomas M. Murchison. 1960. 1998.
- Adtimchiol an Chreidimh: the Gaelic version of John Carswell’s Catechismus Ecclesiae Genevensis, edited by R. L. Thomson. 1962.
- Òrain Iain Luim. Songs of John MacDonald, Bard of Keppoch, edited by Annie M. Mackenzie. 1964.
- Òrain agus Luinneagan Gàidhlig le Màiri nighean Alasdair Ruaidh. Gaelic Songs of Mary Macleod, edited by James Carmichael Watson. 1965, 1982.
- Bàrdachd Shìlis na Ceapaich: Poems and songs by Sìleas MacDonald, edited by Colm Ó Baoill. 1972.
- Foirm na n-Urrnuidheadh: John Carswell’s Gaelic translation of the Book of Common Order, edited by R. L. Thomson. 1970.
- The Blind Harper (An Clàrsair Dall): the Songs of Roderick Morison, edited by William Matheson. 1970.
- Sporan Dhòmhnaill: Gaelic poems and songs by the late Donald Macintyre, the Paisley Bard, edited by Somerled MacMillan. 1968.
- Eachann Bacach and Other Maclean Poets (Eachann Bacach agus Bàird Eile de Chloinn Ghill-Eathain), Colm Ó Baoill. 1979.
- Highland Songs of the Forty-Five (Òrain Ghàidhealach mu Bhliadhna Theàrlaich), edited by John Lorne Campbell. 1984. 1997.
- Sgrìobhaidhean Choinnich MhicLeòid: the Gaelic prose of Kenneth MacLeod, edited by Thomas M. Murchison. 1988.
- The MacDiarmid MS Anthology, edited by Professor Derick S. Thomson. 1992.
- Tenants and Landlords (Tuath is Tighearna), edited by Donald E. Meek. 1995.
- Mairghread nighean Lachlainn, song-maker of Mull, edited by Colm Ó Baoill. 2009.
- Tales from Highland Perthshire, translated and edited by Sylvia Robertson and Tony Dilworth. 2009.
- Os Cionn Gleadhraich nan Sràidean: Sgrìobhaidhean Thòmais MhicCalmain, edited by Donald E. Meek (Dòmhnall E. Meek). 2010.
- Màiri nighean Alasdair Ruaidh: Song-maker of Skye and Berneray, edited by Colm Ó Baoill. 2014.
- Laoidhean Spioradail Dhùghaill Bhochanain, edited by Donald E. Meek. 2015.
- Còmhraidhean nan Cnoc: The Nineteenth-Century Gaelic Prose Dialogue, edited by Sheila M. Kidd. 2016.
- A Borrowing of Verses (Iasad Rann), edited by William Gillies and Donald E. Meek. 2018.
- Iain mac Mhurchaidh: the Life and Work of John MacRae, Kintail and North Carolina, Edited by Màiri Sìne Chaimbeul. 2020.
- Na Sgeulachdan Gàidhlig: Iain Mac a’ Ghobhainn, compiled by Iain MacDhòmhnaill and Moray Watson. 2022.

=== New Series ===
In 1996, the SGTS launched a parallel paperback called "New Paperback Series". The aim of the New Series is to provide selections from the work of individual writers, complete texts where only a small body of work survives, or themed miscellanies. Volumes include introductions, notes, and glossaries where appropriate, but do not normally provide full translations.

- Alasdair Mac Mhaighstir Alasdair: Selected Poems, edited by Professor Derick S. Thomson. 1996.
- Màiri Mhòr nan Òran: Taghadh de a h-Òrain, edited by Professor Donald E. Meek (Dòmhnall E. Meek). 1998.
- Mo Là Gu Seo: Eachdraidh mo Bheatha le Tòmas M MacCalmain, edited by Donald E. Meek. 2011.
- Òran na Comhachaig le Dòmhnall mac Fhionnlagh nan Dàn, edited by Pat Menzies. 2012.
- Dugald Buchanan (1716–1768): The poet, the translator, and the manuscript evidence (The Canna Lecture 2016), by Donald E. Meek. 2019.

== Canna Lecture ==
Since 2016, there is a lecture that the Scottish Gaelic Text Society host every year in Scotland.

Canna Lecture 2025
Date	21 November 2025
Speaker	Dr Martin Macgregor, Senior Lecturer in Scottish History at the University of Glasgow
Venue	University of Edinburgh
Title	“Ach thèid an crann a thoirt dhen fharadh”: Celebrating Thirty Years of Tuath is Tighearna (‘Tenants and Landlords’), 1995-2025

Canna Lecture 2024
Date	19 November 2024
Speaker	Dr Anja Gunderloch (University of Edinburgh)
Venue	University of Edinburgh
Title	The Gaelic Ways of Life in the Poetry of Donnchadh Bàn Macintyre

Canna Lecture 2023
Date	6 December 2023
Speaker	Dr Priscilla Scott
Venue	University of Edinburgh
Title	‘Seinnidh mi le deòin do chliù’: Praise of patrons, public figures, and personal friends in the songs of Màiri Mhòr nan Òran

Canna Lecture 2019
Date	25 May 2019
Speaker	Professor Hugh Cheape
Venue	University of Aberdeen
Title	John Lorne Campbell of Canna: pioneer and polemicist

Canna Lecture 2017
Date	7 September 2017
Speaker	Professor Sheila Kidd (University of Glasgow)
Venue	National Library of Scotland
Title	Gaelic Writing from the Bible to the stage

Canna Lecture 2016
Date	17 October 2016
Speaker	Professor Emeritus Donald E. Meek
Venue	University of Glasgow/ St George’s Tron Church of Scotland, Glasgow
Title	Dugald Buchanan (1716-68): Man, Myth and Scholarly Circle

== See also ==
- Scottish Text Society
