= Galston parish =

Parish in East Ayrshire, Scotland

Coordinates: 55.60037°N 4.3798°W

Galston Parish
- Location within East Ayrshire
- Population: 6,500 (Census 2001)
- Language: English
- OS grid reference: NS569200
- Council area: East Ayrshire
- Lieutenancy area: Ayrshire and Arran
- Country: Scotland
- Sovereign state: United Kingdom
- Police: Scotland
- Fire: Scottish
- Ambulance: Scottish
- UK Parliament: Kilmarnock and Loudoun
- Scottish Parliament: Kilmarnock and Irvine Valley; South Scotland

Galston Parish is situated in East Ayrshire, Scotland, some five to ten miles east of Kilmarnock and roughly encompasses the southern half of the Upper Irvine Valley (locally known as The Valley). The parish shares strong links with the parish of Loudoun, with which it shares a border along the River Irvine.

== Etymology ==
The earliest reference to the name appears as Gallistoun. The consensus is that the name combines the Gaelic word Gall (meaning stranger) and the Anglian word tun (meaning hamlet or enclosure). It is impossible to say who the strangers were, but it is generally accepted that they were Gaels, due to the profusion of Gaelic names in the area.

== Geography ==
The parish covers an area of about 61.4 square kilometers (23.7 square miles) and shares borders with six neighbouring parishes: Avondale (east), Kilmarnock (north-west), Loudoun (north), Mauchline (south-east), Riccarton (south-west) and Sorn (south). Of these six parishes, Galston is most commonly linked with Loudoun, because the parishes share strong historical and social links, as well as public services.

Within the parish can be found the town of Galston, along with Greenholm and the village of Priestland. The most prominent buildings in the parish are Cessnock Castle and The Barr Castle. In modern times, Galston, Greenholm and Priestland are often said to be in Loudoun, but this is incorrect as all three lie south of the River Irvine, which marks the border between the two parishes. The mistake most likely stems from the fact that in modern times the name Galston is almost exclusively used to refer to the town, but Loudoun is still used to define an area.

== Auchruglen Castle ==
The Castle and Lands of Auchruglen lay within the parish.

== Further Study ==
- James Mair, A Pictorial History of Galston, Alloway Publishing, 1988
- Bobby Young, Galston: Place Of The Strangers, 1999
- Hugh Maxwell, Old Galston, Stenlake Publishing, 2001
