= John Nisbet =

Scottish Presbyterian soldier (d. 1685)

John Nisbet of Hardhill
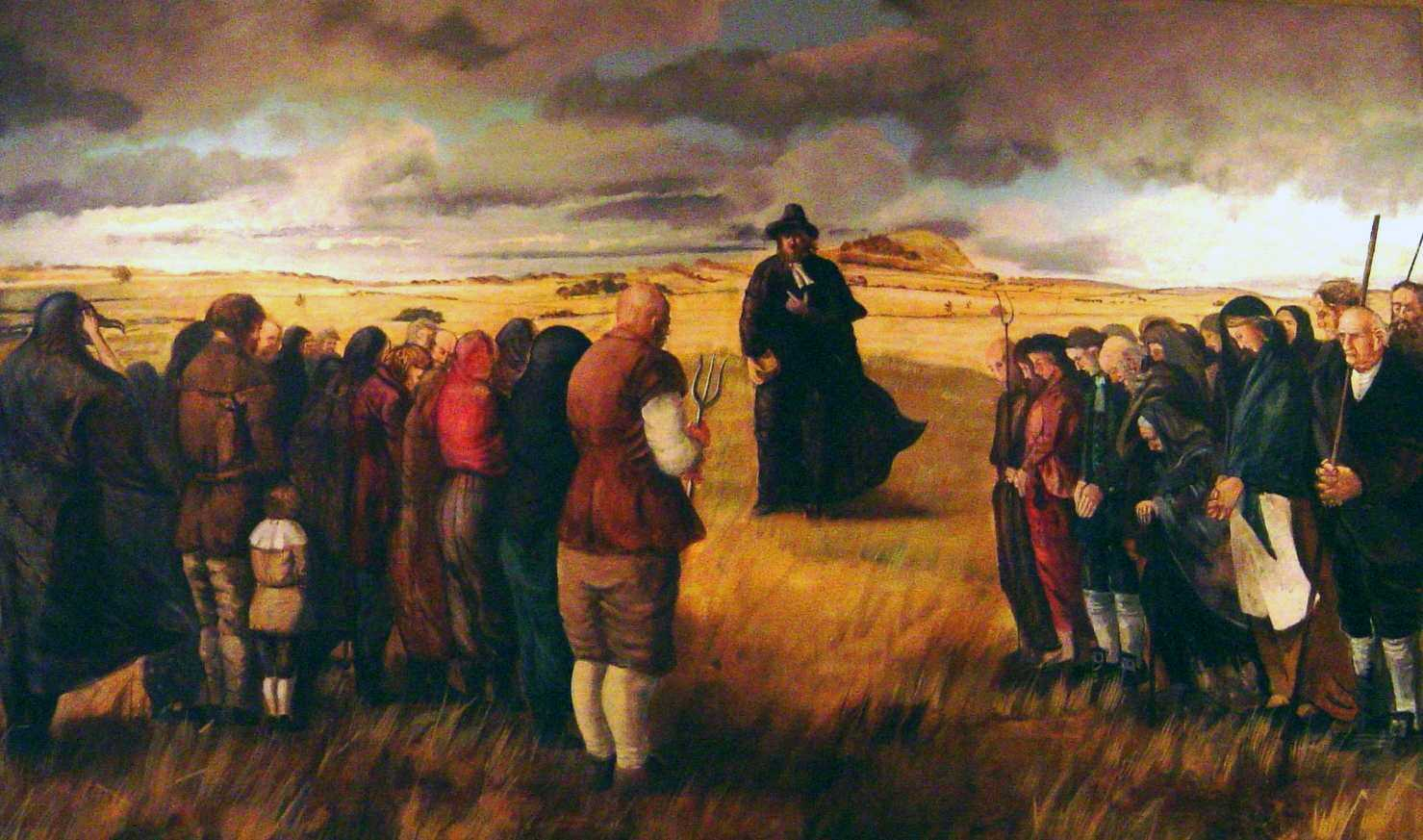
- conventicle near Loudoun Hill
- Born: 1627
- Died: 4 December 1685 (executed); Grassmarket, Edinburgh
- Burial place: Greyfriars Kirkyard
- Military career
- Rank: Captain
- Conflicts: Battle of Rullion Green; Battle of Drumclog; Battle of Bothwell Bridge

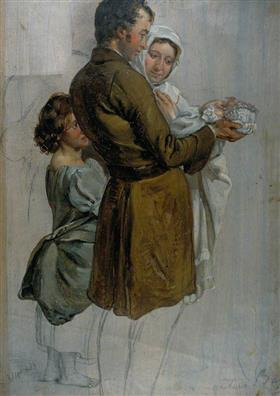
Nibset was threatened with excommunication for having his child baptised by one of the expelled ministers

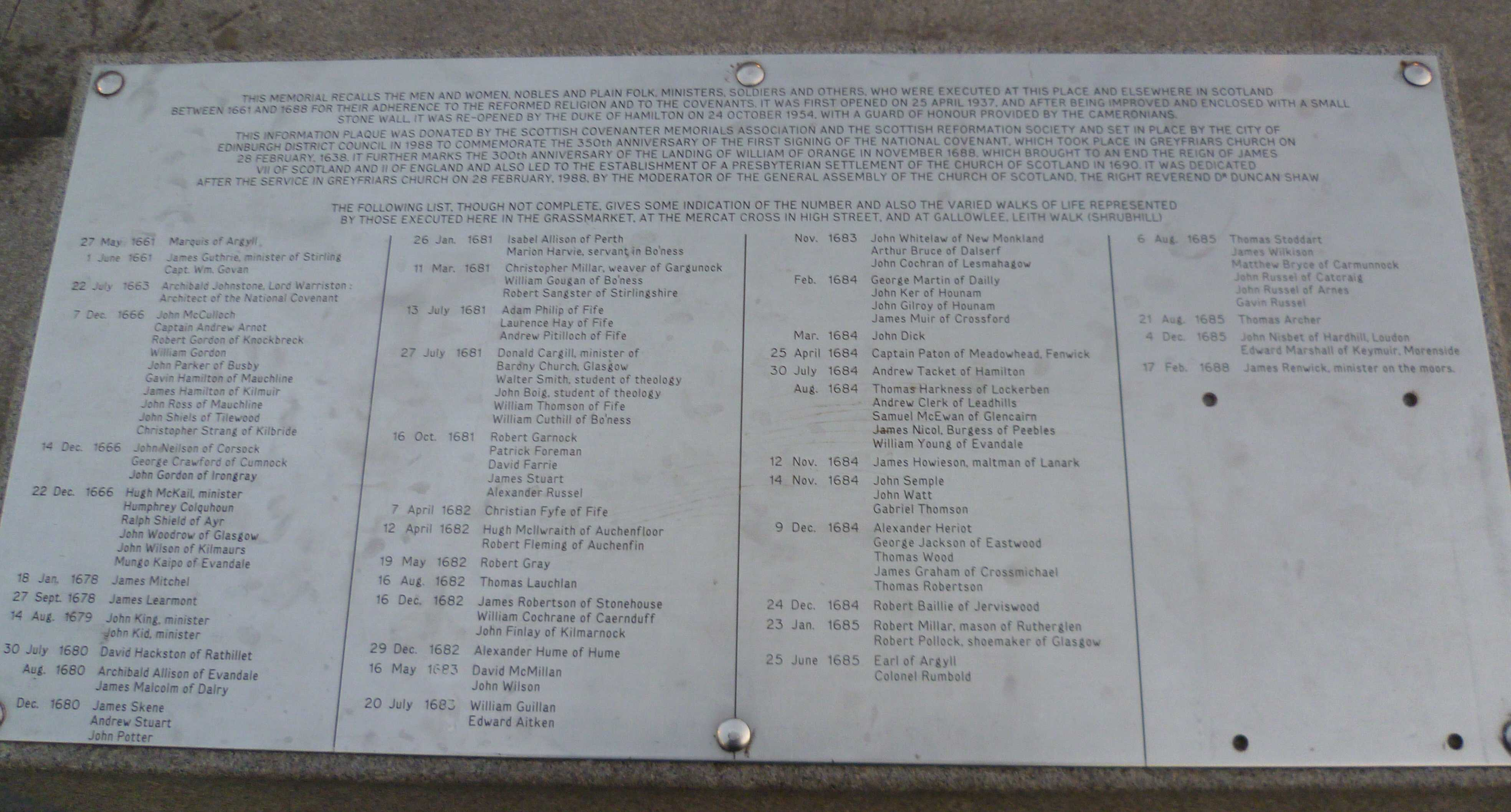
Plaque, Grassmarket

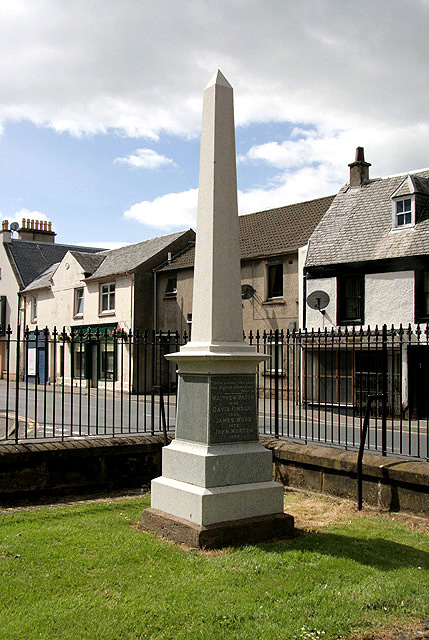
Covenanter memorial to John Nisbet and his son James Nisbet and to John Nisbet, the younger and others

John Nisbet (1627–1685) was a Scottish covenanter who was executed for participating in the insurgency at Bothwell Brig and earlier conflicts and for attending a conventicle. He took an active and prominent part in the struggles, of the Covenanters for civil and religious liberty. He was wounded and left for dead at Pentland in 1666 but lived and fought as a captain at Bothwell Bridge, in 1679. He was subsequently seized and executed as a rebel. He was a descendant of Murdoch Nisbet, a Lollard who translated the Bible into the Scots language.

== Life ==
He was the son of James Nisbet an Ayrshire tenant farmer at Drakemyre, and his wife, Jane Gibson. He travelled to mainland Europe where he participated in the Thirty Years' War as a professional soldier. He attended the 1650 coronation of Charles II at Scone, where he subscribed the covenant, swearing his allegiance to ‘all the acts of reformation attained to in Scotland from 1638 to 1649’. After returning to the family home at Hardhill, near Loudoun, he married Margaret Law in 1651.

In 1664 he incurred the displeasure of the Episcopalian incumbent of his parish, for having had a child baptized by one of the ejected ministers. The curate declared from the pulpit, that he intended to excommunicate him next Lord's day, but was prevented by sudden death.

After the Restoration he took an active and prominent part in the struggles of the covenanters for religious and civil liberty. He refused to countenance the curates, and attended the ministrations of the ‘outed’ ministers, renewed the covenants at Lanark in 1666, and was one of the small band who published the declarations of the Societies at Rutherglen, Glasgow, and Sanquhar. He fought at Rullion Green (28 Nov. 1666) till, covered with wounds, he fell down and was stripped and left for dead upon the field. At nightfall, however, he crept away unobserved, and lived to take part in the engagements at Drumclog (1 June 1679) and Bothwell Brig (22 June), where he held the rank of captain. For this he was denounced as a rebel and forfeited, three thousand merks (£165 sterling) being offered for his head. On 16 April 1685, Nisbet and Alexander Peden was almost captured in Nisbet's house. In November 1685 he was surprised, with three others, at a place called Midland, in the parish of Fenwick, Ayrshire, his captor being a cousin of his own, Lieutenant Robert Nisbet. His companions were instantly shot, but for the sake of the reward he was spared, and, being brought to Edinburgh, was tried and condemned to death.

== Death ==
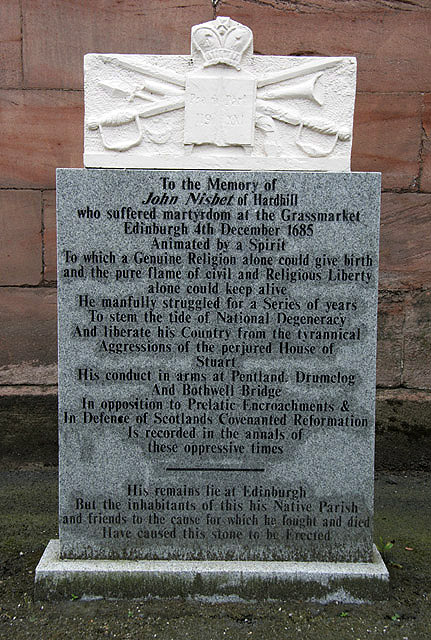
memorial in Loudoun Parish Churchyard

Nisbet was eventually captured at Fenwick and following trial was executed in the Grassmarket in Edinburgh on 4 December 1685 by hanging. Nisbet is buried at Greyfriars Kirkyard in Edinburgh, and there is a memorial monument at Loudoun Parish Kirk in Newmilns.

== Family ==
He married Margaret Law in 1651. By his wife, Margaret Law, he had several children, but only three sons survived him, namely, Hugh, James, and Alexander. Serjeant James Nisbet was son to John Nisbet of Hardhill, and died in 1726, in Edinburgh Castle. His diary is chiefly religious. For extracts see Appendix to "Memoirs of Veitch and Brysson." His speaking portrait of Peden will be found in "The Fifty-Years' Struggle," by Dodds, p. 339.

== Works ==
With a short account of his last words on the Scaffold. 4 December 1685. Dr. Tweedie said: "Few, perhaps, would now approve of all the sentiments emitted by John Nisbet; but there can be as few who do not admire the fortitude with which he endured for what he reckoned the truth, and the patience with which he suffered rather than consent to violate his conscience or compromise his convictions.". [The first edition appeared in 1718, with a preface by James Nisbet his son, then in Edinburgh Castle.]

== See also ==
- Murdoch Nisbet
- John Nisbet, the younger
