= Bible translations into Scots =

The Bible has been completely translated into Lowland Scots, with parts also translated. In 1513–1539 Murdoch Nisbet, associated with a group of Lollards, wrote a Scots translation of the New Testament, working from John Purvey's Wycliffite Bible. However, this work remained unpublished, in manuscript form, and was known only to his family and Bible scholars. It was published by the Scottish Text Society in 1901–1905. The first direct translation of a book of the Bible from one of the original languages, rather than a pre-existing English model was Peter Hately Waddell's The Psalms: frae Hebrew intil Scottis, published in 1871.

William Lorimer, a noted classical scholar, produced the first New Testament translation into modern Scots from the original koine Greek (though, in an appendix, when Satan speaks to Christ, he is quoted in Standard English), and this work too was published posthumously, in 1983.

In the 1990s, Jamie Stuart published A Glasgow Bible, which is a collection of paraphrased Biblical stories into the Glaswegian dialect of Scots.

The Gospel of Luke has been published in Ulster Scots under the title Guid Wittins Frae Doctèr Luik. It was published in 2009 by Ullans Press, with the copyright held by the Ulster-Scots Language Society.

Gordon Hay, a retired solicitor, translated both testaments into the Doric dialect of Scots spoken in the northeast of Scotland. He published his translation of the New Testament in 2012, followed by the Old Testament in 2023.

== See also ==
- Bible translations into Scottish Gaelic
- Modern English Bible translations
