= Abney-Hastings =

Abney-Hastings is a double-barrelled surname created from the surnames Abney and Hastings.

The family is most notable for their royal heritage as the senior descendants of George Plantagenet, 1st Duke of Clarence, as explained in the BBC historical documentary, Britain's Real Monarch, presented by Tony Robinson. And historic tradition of reference for their family seat, Loudoun Castle, a 19th-century country house near Galston, in the Loudoun area of Ayrshire, Scotland. Which was referred to as, The Windsor of Scotland.

Notable people with this surname include:

- Barbara Abney-Hastings, 13th Countess of Loudoun (1919–2002), British aristocrat
- Charles Abney-Hastings (1792–1858), British politician
- Edith Abney-Hastings, 12th Countess of Loudoun (1883–1960), English aristocrat
- Frank Abney Hastings (1794–1828), British naval officer
- Michael Abney-Hastings, 14th Earl of Loudoun (1942–2012), British-born Australian rice researcher, also known as King Michael
- Simon Abney-Hastings, 15th Earl of Loudoun (born 1974), Australian peer, also known as King Simon

== See also ==
- Abney-Hastings baronets
