= Loudoun Castle =

Ruined 19th-century country house in Ayrshire, Scotland

Coordinates: 55°36′38″N 4°22′22″W

Designations

Inventory of Gardens and Designed Landscapes in Scotland
- Official name: Loudoun Castle
- Designated: 30 June 1987
- Reference no.: GDL00269

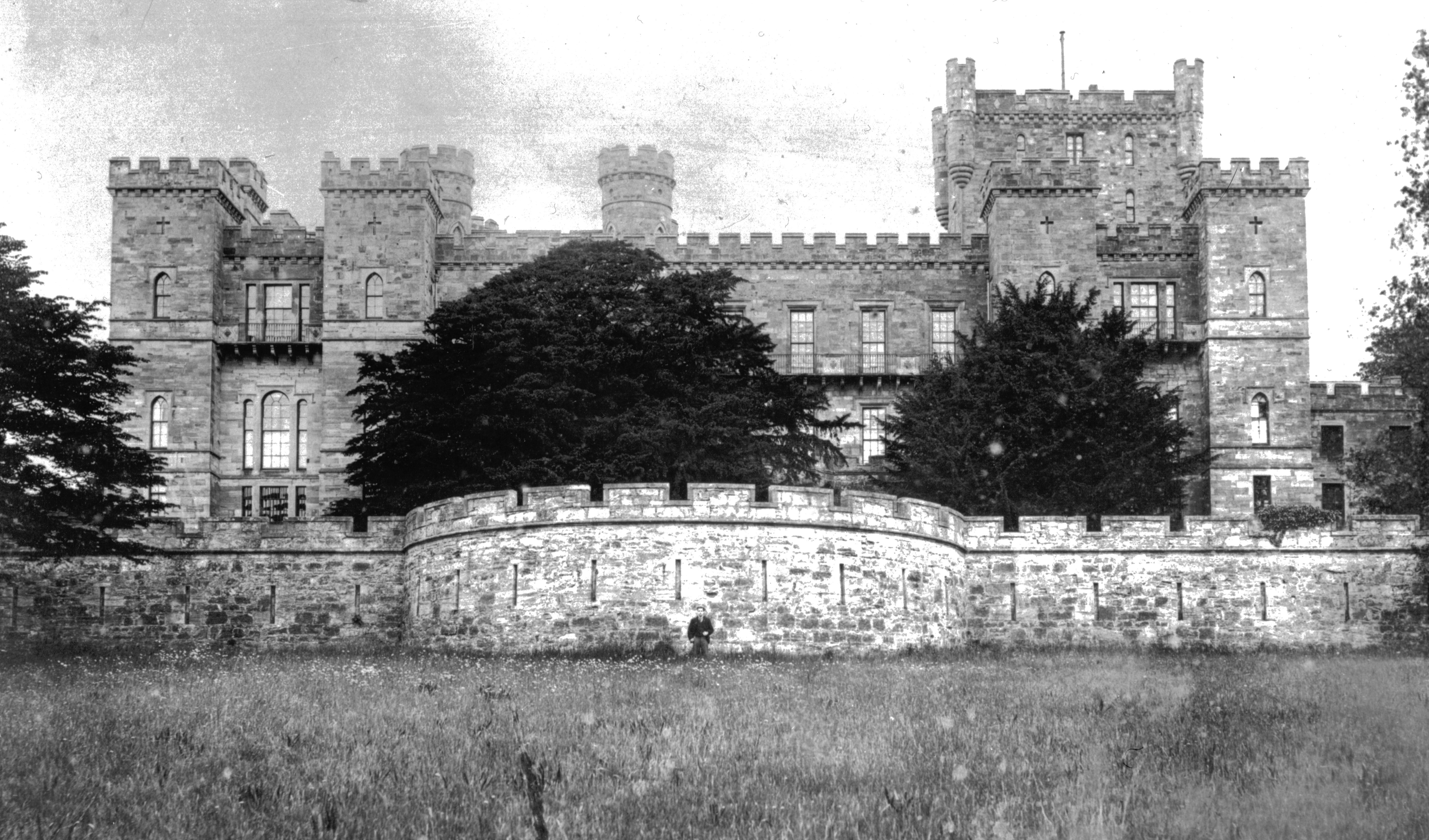
Garden front of Loudoun Castle in the 1890s

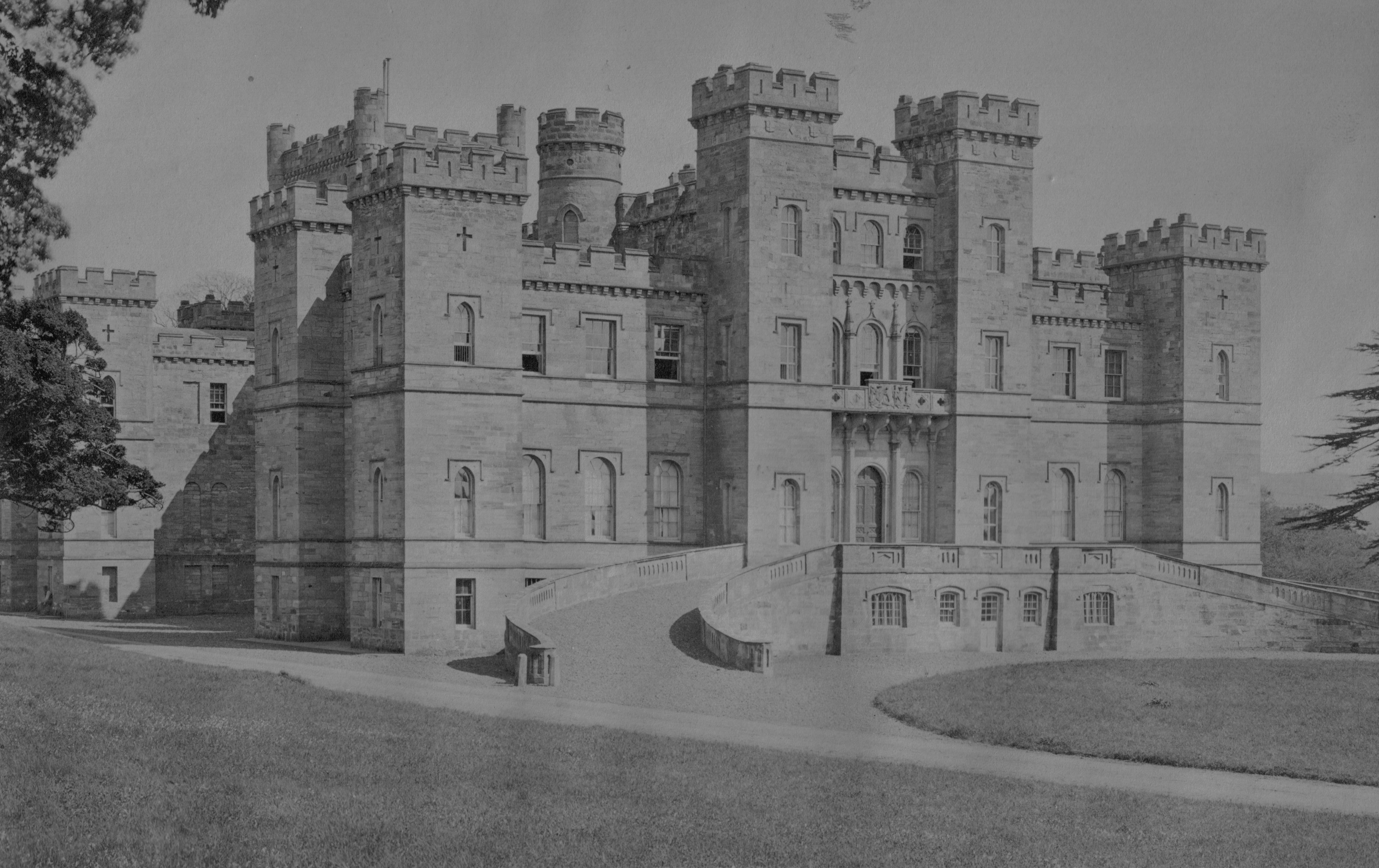
Entrance front of Loudoun Castle in the 1890s

Map of Loudoun Castle

Loudoun Castle is a ruined country house nicknamed the "Windsor of Scotland" located near Galston, in the Loudoun area of Ayrshire, Scotland. The majority of the building was constructed from 1804 to 1811 around existing structures dating to the 15th and 17th centuries. The building was destroyed by fire in 1942 and never rebuilt, while the rest of the property was converted into the Loudoun Castle theme park in 1995, which closed in 2010. The ruins are protected as a category A listed building.

== History ==
Loudoun Castle is the former home of the Mure-Campbell family. Upon the marriage by Flora Mure-Campbell, 6th Countess of Loudoun, to Francis Rawdon-Hastings, 2nd Earl of Moira (later Marquess of Hastings), on 12 July 1804, it became the home of the Rawdon-Hastings family. While Loudoun was in the ownership of Edith Rawdon-Hastings, the ownership named encountered a change once more by the death of Sir Charles Abney-Hastings, 2nd Bt. In Edith's inheritance there was a condition from Sir Charles, a natural grandson of the 10th Earl of Huntingdon – brother of Lady Edith's grandmother – that by Royal Licence and Act of Parliament, whoever inherited the estate of the Abney family shall take on the surname of Abney-Hastings.

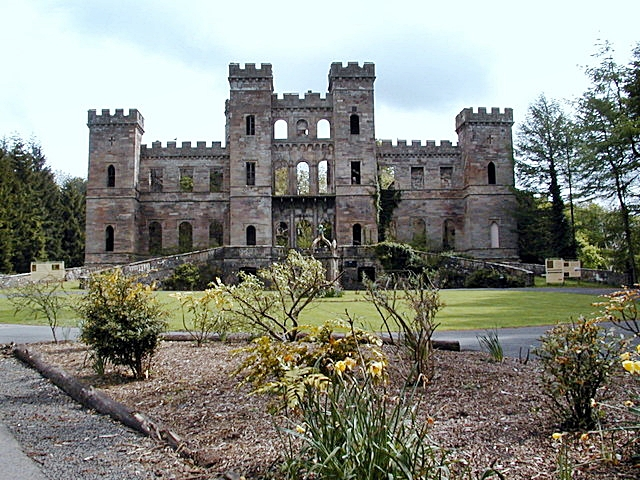
Remains of Loudoun Castle, c. 2003

The present castle was built for Flora, adjoining the 17th-century extension, and the 15th-century keep. The plans of Loudoun Castle were drawn up in 1805 by the architect Archibald Elliot. One estimate suggests that the "improvements" to Loudoun Castle between 1804 and 1811 cost over £100,000 – over £3,500,000 in today's money. The massive structure, known as The Windsor of Scotland, had over 90 apartments, and was dominated by the main tower in the rear of the building. The regal library on the south front, measured 100 feet in length and contained upwards of 11,000 volumes. Archibald Elliot's plans included a large banqueting hall on the north front, but this was not built through lack of money.

The plantations around the castle comprise a great variety of trees, many of them of very stately appearance and brought from America by John Campbell, 4th Earl of Loudoun, who was governor of Virginia in 1756 and who during his military services in various parts of the world sent home every kind of valuable tree he met with. He also formed an extensive collection of willows selected from England, Ireland and Holland.

Janet Little (1759 to 1813), author of The Poetical Works of Janet Little, The Scotch Milkmaid worked at Loudoun Castle and was buried at Loudoun Kirk.

A 300-pound stone from Loudoun Castle in Scotland was presented to Loudoun County, Virginia by the Countess of Loudoun and the Queen's representative, the Rouge Dragon, in a special ceremony. In 2015, during the 15th Earl's inaugural trip, he visited Loudoun County and posed for photos with Loudoun County Board of Supervisors Chairman Scott York.

== Fire ==
On 1 December 1941, the Loudon family comprising Lady Loudoun, her daughters and infant granddaughter Sheena, were sleeping in their rooms under the first floor library. Heating was by coal and log fires and it is thought that burning resin came back down the library chimney and set the wooden floor alight. The resulting fire destroyed the building, except for the stone walls.

== Wallace's Sword ==
Published text from The Antiquarian –

"The Countess of Loudoun recently arrived at Loudoun Castle with the sword of Wallace. This sword has been reserved in Loudoun Castle from death of Wallace until five years back when it was removed by the late Marquis of Hastings to his seat in Leicestershire. On the death of the marquis in 1868 it passed into possession of the present countess who has just brought back to its old home. It will be remembered that the mother of Wallace was a daughter of Loudoun, and that on death of his uncle Sir Reginald Crawford of Loudoun – hanged by the English at Ayr Wallace – Wallace had the custody of his only daughter Susanna Crawford of Loudoun married a son of Sir Niel Campbell of Argyll and ancestress of the present Countess of Loudoun the hereditary custodian of the sword of William Wallace.

"One of Wallace's swords was a treasured family possession, and was hung in Loudoun Castle's entrance hall. To give a visual perspective, the hall was around 70 feet by 30 feet, and the Wallace Sword was placed in a position of honour on the east wall."

== Traditions ==
A ley tunnel is said to run from Loudoun Castle, under the River Irvine, to Cessnock Castle over 2 kilometres (1.2 mi) to the south.

== See also ==
- Loudoun Kirk
- Loudoun Castle (theme park)
- Castle and Lands of Auchruglen
