= Hugh Morton =

Hugh Morton may refer to:

- Hugh Morton (actor) (1903–1984), English actor
- Hugh Morton (footballer) (1902–1980), Scottish footballer of the 1920s and 1930s
- Hugh Morton, Baron Morton of Shuna (Hugh Drennan Baird Morton, 1930–1995), Scottish lawyer and judge.
- Hugh Morton (photographer) (Hugh MacRae Morton, 1921–2006), American photographer and nature conservationist

== See also ==
- C. M. S. McLellan (1865–1916), dramatist who wrote under the name "Hugh Morton"
