= James Leslie =

James or Jim Leslie may refer to:

- James Leslie (bishop) (died 1695), Anglican bishop in Ireland
- James Leslie (Canadian politician) (1786–1873), Canadian businessman and politician
- James Leslie (engineer) (1801–1889), Scottish civil engineer
- James Leslie (footballer) (1908–1980), Scottish footballer with Kilmarnock
- James Leslie (British politician) (1958–2009), former MLA for North Antrim
- James Graham Leslie (1868–1949), Northern Irish politician, Lord Lieutenant of Antrim
- James Leslie (principal) (c. 1610–1678), Scottish physician and principal of Marischal College
- Jim Leslie (businessman) (1922–2012), Australian businessman, chairman of Qantas, chancellor of Deakin University
- Jim Leslie (footballer) (fl. 1890s), Scottish footballer with Clyde and Sunderland
- Jim Leslie (journalist) (1937–1976), journalist and public relations executive assassinated in 1976

== See also ==
- Sir James Lesley, also spelled Leslie; soldier
- James Lesslie (1802–1885), Ontario bookseller, reform politician and newspaper publisher
