= Priestland =

Coordinates: 55.609°N 4.259°W

- Location within East Ayrshire
- Population: 121 (Census 2001)
- Language: English
- OS grid reference: NS577374
- Council area: East Ayrshire
- Lieutenancy area: Ayrshire and Arran
- Country: Scotland
- Sovereign state: United Kingdom
- Post town: DARVEL
- Postcode district: KA17
- Dialling code: 01560
- Police: Scotland
- Fire: Scottish
- Ambulance: Scottish
- UK Parliament: Kilmarnock and Loudoun
- Scottish Parliament: Kilmarnock and Irvine Valley

Priestland is a village in East Ayrshire, Scotland. It has a population of 121 (Census 2001) and lies on the A71, around two miles west of Loudoun Hill, ten miles east of Kilmarnock and twenty miles south of Glasgow. It is situated in a valley through which the River Irvine runs and alongside the burghs of Galston, Newmilns and Darvel (with which it borders), forms an area known as the Upper Irvine Valley (locally referred to as The Valley).
