= Loudoun Kirk =

- Loudoun Kirk
- 55.60668°N 4.39390°W
- Location: Loudoun, East Ayrshire
- Country: Scotland
- Denomination: Presbyterian
- Previous denomination: Roman Catholic

History
- Status: Parish church
- Founded: 1198 or 1451
- Dedication: St Michael

Architecture
- Functional status: Preserved
- Style: Gothic

Administration
- Parish: Loudoun

Loudoun Kirk is a disused church located about one mile west of Loudoun Castle, East Ayrshire. It served as Loudoun's parish church until some point after 1600, when this function moved to the church in nearby Newmilns. It subsequently fell into a state of disrepair, however since 1994 has been preserved by a local charity, Friends Of Loudoun Kirk.

== Early history ==
Loudoun Kirk (11/06/10)

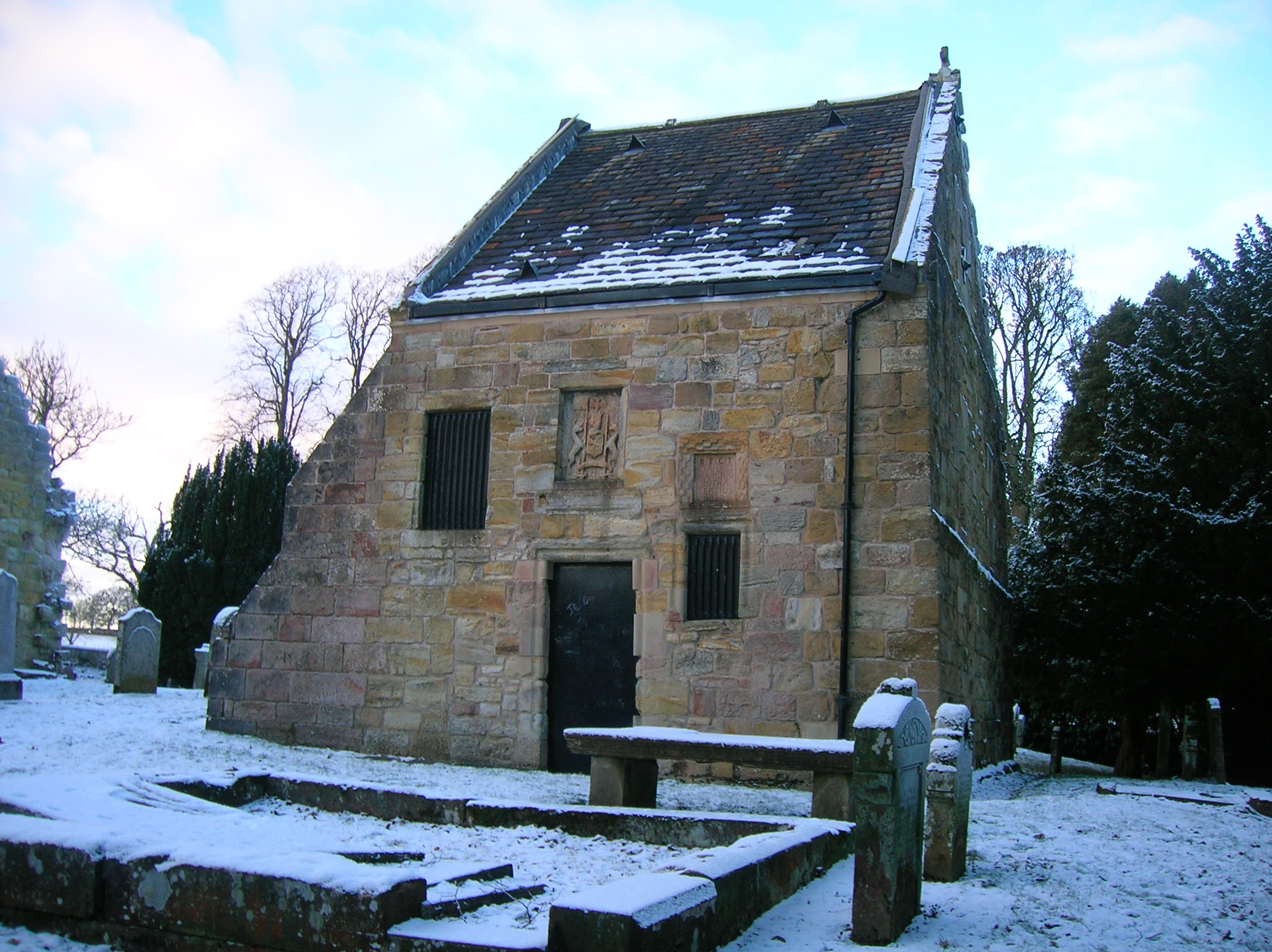
Loudoun Kirk from the South.

The establishment of Loudoun Kirk marks the earliest known Christian worship in the surrounding area. It is widely regarded as having been founded in 1451, with most local historians taking this date from an 1890 translation of the Latin text, Muniments of the Royal Burgh of Irvine. Recently however, local historian Alastair Hendry unearthed a letter referring to church rents dating prior to 1451. After retranslating the Muniments of Irvine, he dated Loudoun Kirk to 1198. At or soon after its foundation, the revenues of Loudoun Kirk, were allocated to support the monks of the newly founded Kilwinning Abbey, however they were obliged to provide a priest (curate) to attend to the spiritual needs of the parishioners.

During the Campbell versus Kennedy feuds of 1527/8, Loudoun Kirk was badly damaged, but soon rebuilt. In 1530, in recognition of the shift in population, a chapel was built at Newmilns. Loudoun Kirk remained the parish church until at least the 17th century, at which time the chapel in Newmilns was upgraded to parochial status. Loudoun Kirk and its kirkyard continued in use for occasional church services, but more particularly as the last resting-place of generations of the parishioners of Loudoun. The building was repaired in 1898 by the Third Marquis of Bute.

== Ministers ==
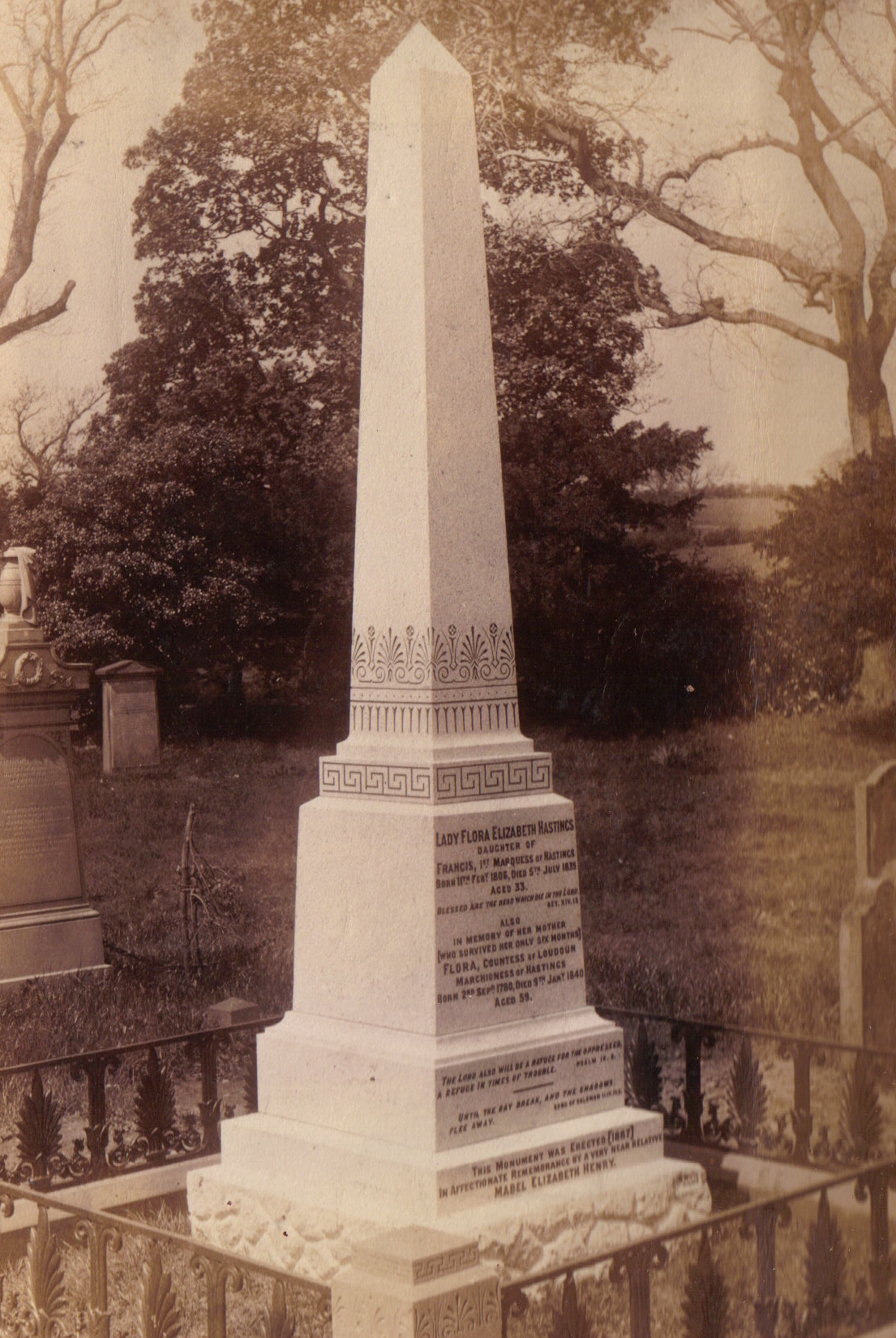
Memorial to Lady Flora Hastings, her niece and mother in Loudoun Kirk.

During the Covenanting times (1638–88), the Rev. John Nevoy of Loudoun Kirk was the chaplain to the Covenanter army led by General Leslie who were fighting the Irish MacDonnels who had invaded the west of Scotland. In 1647 the fortress of Dunaverty was taken and at Nevoy's urging the entire Irish garrison were driven over a cliff to their deaths.

== Graveyard ==
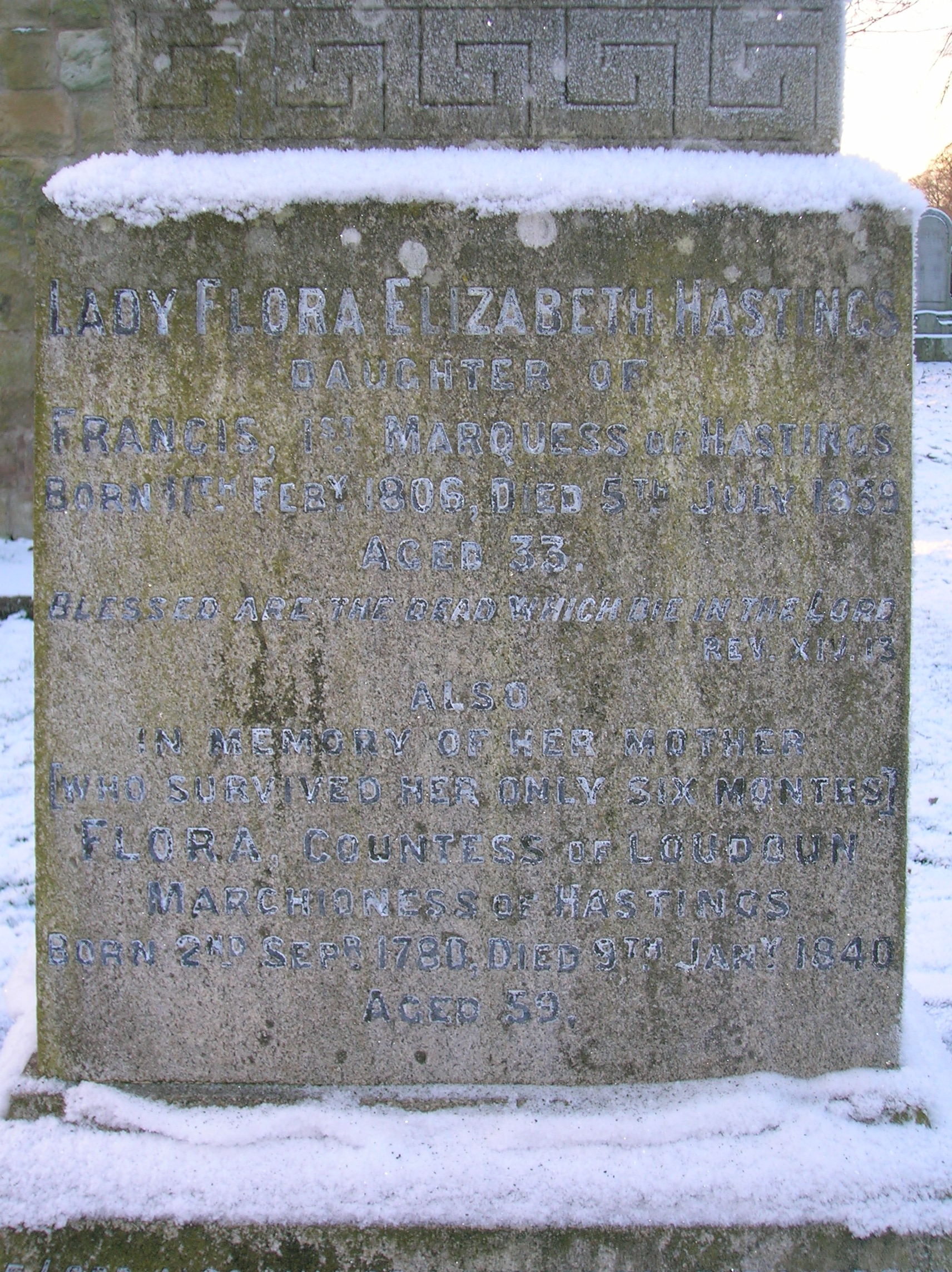
Inscription on the memorial to Lady Flora Hastings and her mother.

Loudoun Kirk's vault and surrounding graveyard served as a burial site for both Loudoun's nobility and locals. Amongst those interred are John Campbell (1st Earl of Loudoun), John Campbell (4th Earl of Loudoun), Lady Flora Hastings, Janet Little who published The Poetical Works of Janet Little, The Scotch Milkmaid and Thomas Fleming (Covenanter, killed at the Battle of Drumclog).

Francis Rawdon-Hastings, 2nd Earl of Moira and Marquess of Hastings, died on 28 November 1826 aboard HMS Revenge (1805) off Naples and following his directions his right hand was cut off and buried with his wife, Flora Mure-Campbell, Marchioness of Hastings and 6th Countess of Loudoun (1780 – 8 January 1840) who was the second daughter of James Mure-Campbell, 5th Earl of Loudoun and Lady Flora Macleod. This wish was complied with, and his hand now rests clasped with hers in the family vault.

Recently, Friends of Loudoun Kirk completed a survey of the headstones and plaques found within the graveyard, with the findings being made available to the public via digital media.

== Dead bell ==
The Loudoun Kirk dead bell still survived in 1894, having originally been sent to the parishioners from Holland by the 2nd Earl of Loudoun, James Campbell. It had Loudoun Kirk cast in raised lettering and was used at funeral processions; it was held by Mrs Semple at Loudoun Village in 1875.

== Belgian SAS ==
In February 1944, the 5th SAS, under Lieutenant-Colonel Eddy Blondeel (then Captain), was stationed at Loudoun Castle to train for the D-Day Landings of the same year. Members of the 5th SAS returned for 50th anniversary celebrations on 7 November 1994 and during the course of this, gave money to Friends of Loudoun Kirk under the proviso that it be used to erect a plaque on the wall of Loudoun Kirk, bearing the words - In memory of all members of the Belgian Special Air Service Regiment who under the command of Colonel E. Blondeel, D.S.O. were stationed at Loudoun Castle during 1944 and who wish to express their gratitude for the hospitality and friendship extended to them by the Loudoun Family and the people of Scotland. November 27th, 1994.

== Loudoun Village ==
The old kirk is situated next to the site of the village of Loudoun. The village was occupied by local miners, but after the Second World War the houses fell into disrepair. With no mains gas or electricity supply, the residents were moved into the new houses in Galston and the village was abandoned. Foundations of the cottages can be seen in local fields close to the lane. A plan to build a new village in the 1990s came to nothing.

== Further Study ==
- Bobby Young, F.O.L.K., 1995
- Friends Of Loudoun Kirk
