= Baron Morton =

Baron Morton may refer to:

- Fergus Morton, Baron Morton of Henryton (1887-1973), British barrister and judge
- Hugh Morton, Baron Morton of Shuna (1930-1995), Scottish lawyer, judge and politician.
