= Dead bell =

Hand bell rung in conjunction with deaths and funerals

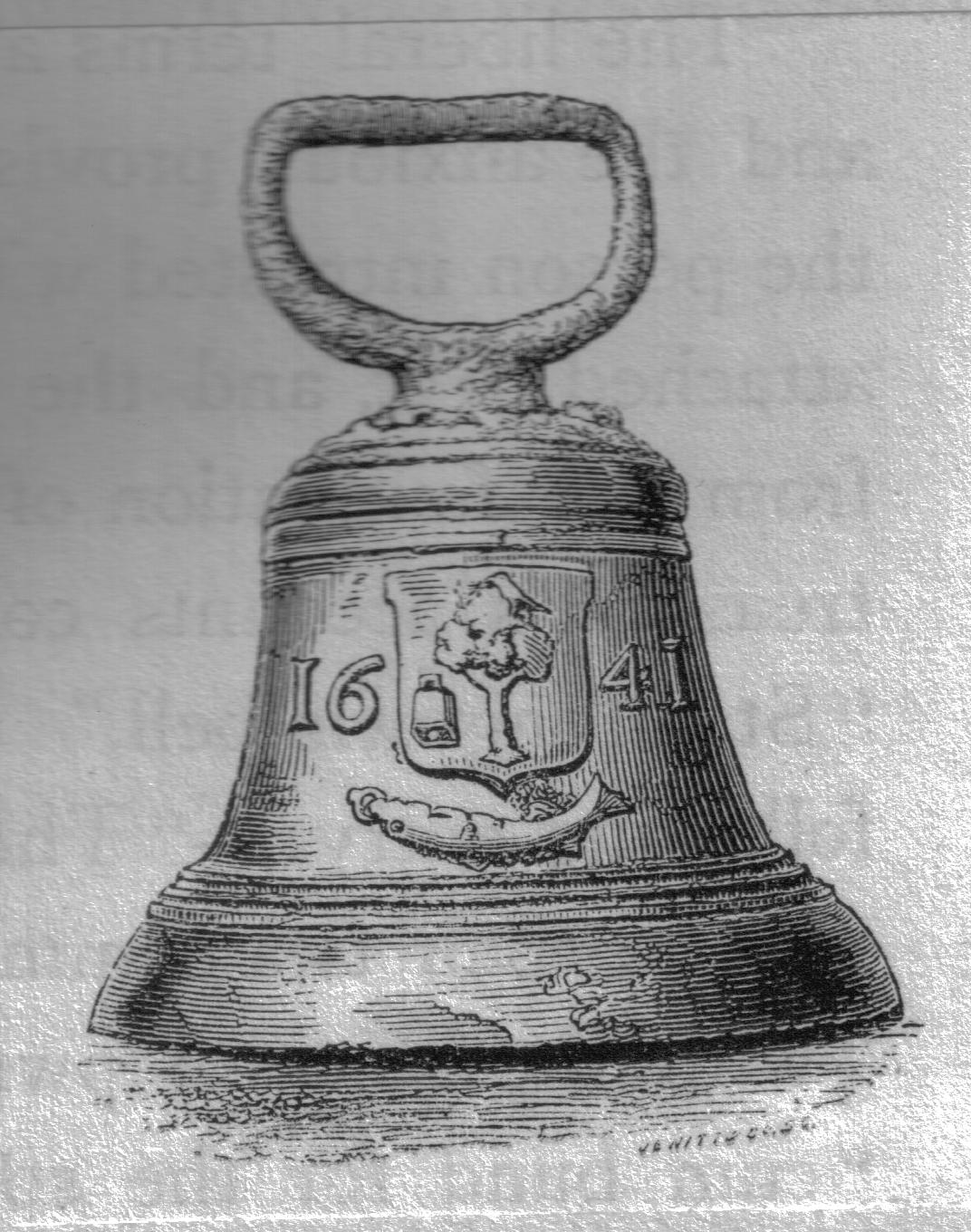
The 1641 Glasgow ‘deid bell’, now on display in Glasgow's People's Palace on Glasgow Green. The bell features the city's coat of arms: the tree, the bell, the fish and the bird, recalling events from the life of St Mungo.

A dead bell or deid bell (Scots), also a 'death', 'mort', 'lych', 'passing bell' or 'skellet bell' was a form of hand bell used in Scotland and northern England in conjunction with deaths and funerals up until the 19th century.

== Origins ==
Belief in the supernatural was common in the Middle Ages and special protective powers were sometimes attributed to certain objects, including bells. The Church itself condoned the use of bells to frighten away evil spirits and this ensured the practice's survival and development. Bells were often baptised, and once baptised were believed by many to possess the power to ward off evil spells and spirits. The use of the dead bell was typical of this belief, rung for the recently deceased to keep evil spirits away from the body.

The dead bell was therefore originally rung for two reasons: firstly to seek the prayers of Christians for a dead person's soul, and secondly to drive away the evil spirits who stood at the foot of the dead person's bed and around the house.

The use of the dead bell is illustrated on the Bayeux Tapestry at the funeral of Edward the Confessor and may have been brought over to Britain by the Normans.

The 14th Century story The Pardoner's Tale tells of a bell rung at a funeral

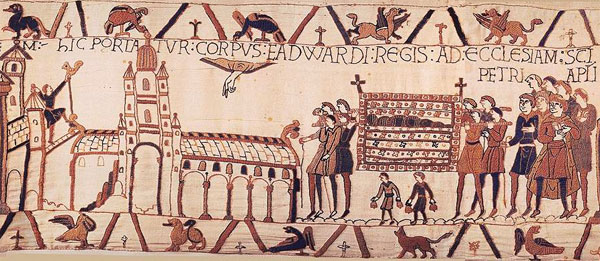
The funeral procession of Edward the Confessor to Westminster Abbey as depicted on the Bayeux Tapestry. Note the dead bells held by the two people next to (below) the deceased.

== Uses ==
Before the Reformation, friars in Glasgow rang the dead bell through the streets for the repose of the soul of the deceased, especially if the individual was a benefactor of the church. It is known that the ancient bell of Saint Mungo (aka Saint Kentigern) was used for this purpose. From 1454 a record survives of the bell being rung annually for the soul of Johne Steuart (John Stewart), the first Provost of Glasgow, who had left lands and property to the church. A record of 1509 for Sir Archibald Crawford of Cadder also shows that the ringing of the dead bell sometimes took place more than once and was intended to encourage others to pray for the deceased, his ancestors, and other Christian souls. In 1594 the presbytery of Glasgow attempted to recover the right of use of the dead bell, arguing that it was an ecclesiastical and not a secular function.

The Ballad of Willie's Lyke-Wake from the north of Scotland records the payment of a groat for the ringing of the dead bell at his funeral by the bedral or bell-man.

In later, secular times, the bell ringer would pass through the streets of villages, towns or cities announcing the name of a recently deceased person, with details of the funeral. At the funeral the bell ringer, often the beadle, would walk at the head the cortege, solemnly ringing the bell from the home of the deceased until the church was reached. The bell was also sometimes used to indicate the point at which the coffin-bearers were changed.

The dead bell ringer was instructed to go through the town no more than twice and was not permitted to use the words "faithful" or "God". He was not permitted to ring the bell before sunrise or after sunset.

Kirk session records show that in one Ayrshire parish the dead bell ringer was paid at a rate of a penny a mile at first, rising to two pence per mile by 1762. The income from the ringing of the dead bell went to the kirk session and was used to support the poor.

The ballad of "Barbara Allan" reads:

"She had not gane a mile but twa,
When she heard the deid bell ringing,
And every jow that the deid bell gaed,
Twas wae to Barbara Allan."

Records show that the use of the dead bell was common in Eastern Scotland during the seventeenth and eighteenth century and for many years before. In pre-reformation times the dead bell was also used to summon the priest to administer the last rites.

In the eighteenth century, the church beadle went around the parish farms, Kirton, and hamlets at the time of the death and later when the funeral arrangements had been settled.

At poor people's funerals the dead bell was hung on a tree and rung throughout the service.

The dead bell was held in high regard and one bell ringer was reportedly sacked for an indecent use of the dead bell.

In the Inns of Court, as well as the usual use, a passing bell was rung on the appointment of a member as a Serjeant-at-Law, who was said to have "died to the Inn" as he left his Inn of Court and joined Serjeant's Inn, until appointments of Serjeants ceased in the 19th century.

== Examples ==
The Loudoun Kirk dead bell still survived in 1894, having originally been sent to the parishioners from Holland by James Campbell, 2nd Earl of Loudoun who died in 1684. It had Loudoun Kirk cast in raised lettering and was used at funeral processions; it was held by Mrs. Semple at Loudoun Village in 1875. Loudoun parish church at Newmilns has a dead bell inscribed "Countess of Loudoun". The Kilmarnock example had the town's name and the date "1639" and was preserved in the town hall. The Galston example had the name and the date "1722". The Maybole dead bell had no markings and after being exhibited at the 1911 Glasgow Exhibition it remained in the Kelvingove Museum's collections. A Hawick dead bell is recorded.

An example of 1641 from Glasgow was made to replace the ancient Saint Mungo's. This bell had the Chapter of Glasgow's seal on it, a tree and a salmon, together with a representation of an ancient square-shaped bell; like that of Saint Mungo, which still existed at that date. Saint Mungo's bell was rescued by a Glasgow magistrate, James Laing, after the reformation and the Glasgow officials purchased it for the substantial sum of £10 Scots in 1577. In 1640 the council had a new dead bell made, Saint Mungo's bell probably having become too worn. This was then used for many years and then lost; however, in 1867 it was recovered and returned to the Glasgow corporation. The present whereabouts of Saint Mungo's bell is unknown.

The Kilmarnock funeral bell carries the inscription "Kilmarnock, 1639" and is made of bell metal, 8 inches 8 inches (20 cm) high and 7 inches 7 inches (18 cm) wide at the mouth. Its use was remembered by local inhabitants still alive in the 1850s. In 1873 the Dunblane dead bell was kept in Dunblane Cathedral. Partick's dead bell was similar to Glasgow's and was dated 1726 and after many travels it was given to the Partick Curling Club. Hexham, Carlisle and Penrith are recorded to have used dead bells as late at the 1870s in the case of Penrith.

== Gravestones ==
In Northern England and Scotland dead bells are not uncommon as symbols of death on funerary monuments. As an emblem of mortality the dead bell was mainly confined to eighteenth-century tombstones in the North-East of Scotland, especially in Morayshire and Aberdeenshire. In Angus and Perthshire its use is rare and further south it only occurs on seventeenth-century stones. The handbell is more common than the church bell and rope, the wooden handle on former being clearly depicted.

== Omens ==
James Hogg, the Ettrick Shepherd, wrote that the dead bell was the 'tinkling in the ears' which the country people regard as the secret intelligence of some friend's decease.

== See also ==
- Death knell
- Funeral toll
