= Peerie Cunningham =

Scottish footballer (1898–1972)

Personal information
- Full name: Henry Cunningham
- Date of birth: 9 January 1898
- Place of birth: Irvine, Scotland
- Date of death: 17 September 1972 (aged 74)
- Place of death: Ayr, Scotland
- Position: Forward

Senior career*
Years	Team	Apps	(Gls)
- Irvine Victoria
- Irvine Meadow
- Cumnock Juniors
1921–1925	Ayr United	140	(33)
1925–1931	Kilmarnock	156	(100)
Total		296	(133)
- * Club domestic league appearances and goals

Henry "Peerie" Cunningham (9 January 1898 – 17 September 1972) was a Scottish footballer who played as a forward, initially being deployed on the right wing or in a creative role but later recording a high scoring rate as a central striker. He spent his early years in junior football in Ayrshire before five seasons at Ayr United, then six at regional rivals Kilmarnock after Ayr were relegated from the top division in 1925.

Cunningham won the Scottish Cup with Kilmarnock in 1929 and set club records for top seasonal goalscorer in the Scottish Football League (34 from 35 appearances) and both major competitions (36 from 39), both in the 1927–28 season; the overall record was soon beaten in 1933 by his replacement in the Killie side, Bud Maxwell, while the league record was equalled by Andy Kerr in 1961 (playing one match fewer).

At representative level he played in an international trial during his time at Ayr United in 1924, but never received a full cap for Scotland.
