= Jock McEwan =

Scottish footballer (1903–1957)

Personal information
- Date of birth: 16 September 1903
- Place of birth: Crookedholm, Scotland
- Date of death: 10 October 1957 (aged 54)
- Place of death: Kilmarnock, Scotland
- Position: Left half

Senior career*
Years	Team	Apps	(Gls)
- Darvel
- Irvine Meadow
1923–1935	Kilmarnock	353	(32)
- * Club domestic league appearances and goals

John McEwan (16 September 1903 – 10 October 1957) was a Scottish footballer who played as a left half. His only club at the professional level was Kilmarnock, where he spent twelve seasons.

He began his career with local junior teams Darvel and Irvine Meadow before joining Kilmarnock in 1923. He quickly became a regular in the side, and was on the field when Killie won the Scottish Cup in 1929 and finished runners-up after a replay in 1932. He made 395 appearances in the cup and Scottish Football League Division One, and visited North America (the club's first tour overseas) in the summer of 1930.
