= Frances Dunlop =

Scottish heiress and landowner

Frances Anna Wallace Dunlop
- Frances Dunlop
- Born: 16 April 1730
- Died: 24 May 1815 (aged 85)

Frances Anna Wallace Dunlop (16 April 1730 – 24 May 1815) was a Scottish heiress, landowner, and correspondent and friend of poet Robert Burns.

== Life ==
Dunlop was born on 16 April 1730. She descended from a brother of William Wallace, the Scottish patriot, and was the last surviving daughter of Sir Thomas Wallace of Craigie, by his wife Eleonora, daughter of Colonel Agnew of Lochryan. Her only brother died before her father, and on her father's death in 1760 she inherited the property. Previous to this, in 1747 at the age of seventeen, she had become the wife of Mr John Dunlop of Dunlop. She was the patron of Janet Little who published The Poetical Works of Janet Little, The Scotch Milkmaid.

=== Relationship with Burns ===
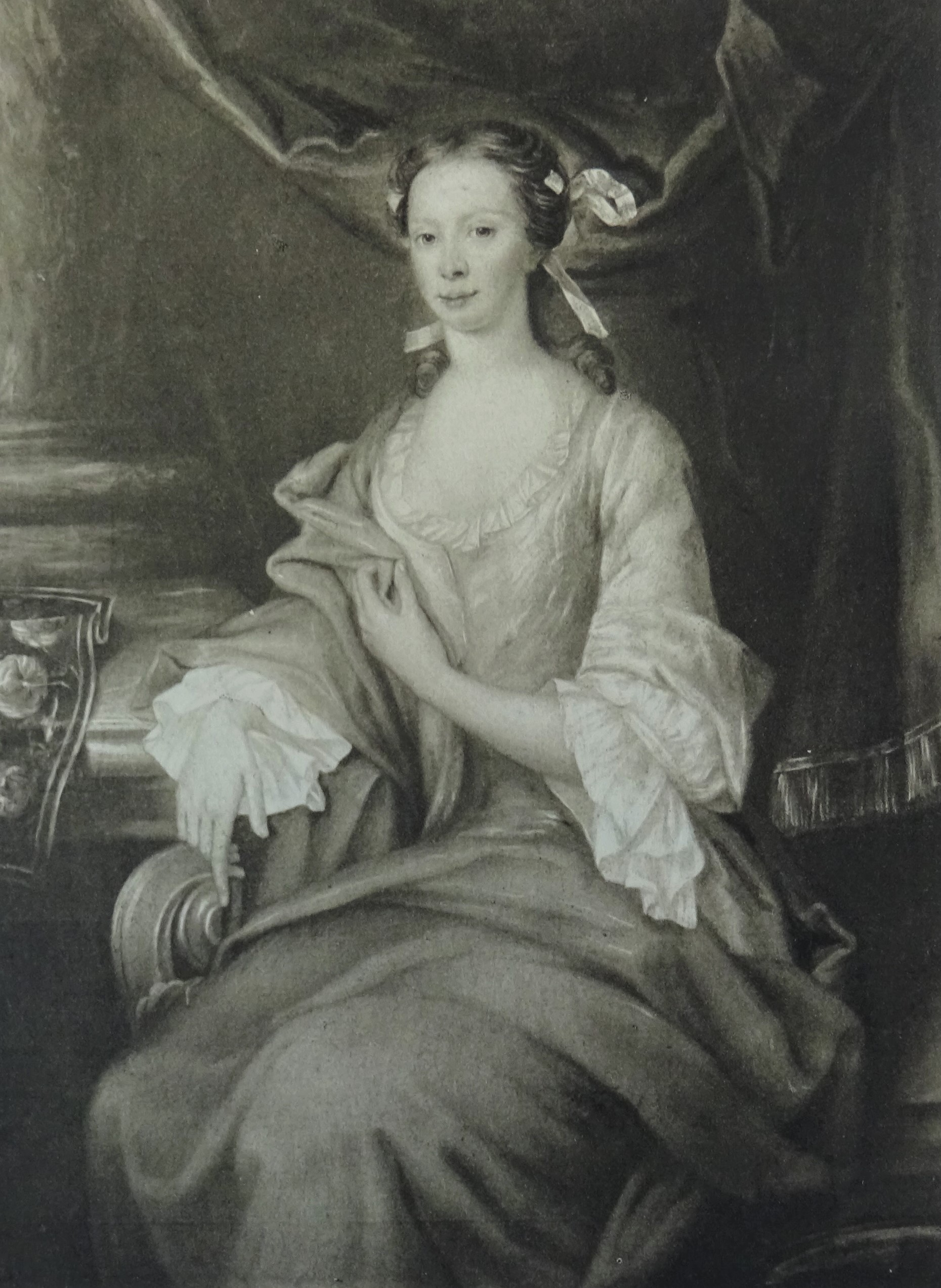
Frances Dunlop in 1747.

Dunlop made the acquaintance of Burns in the winter of 1786, shortly after the publication of his first Kilmarnock volume. Having read The Cotter's Saturday Night in a friend's copy while recovering from a severe illness, she was so delighted with it that she immediately sent off a messenger to Mossgiel Farm (Burns's home), fifteen or sixteen miles distant, for half a dozen copies, and with a friendly invitation for Burns to call at Dunlop House. Her relationship to William Wallace was also mentioned, and Burns in his reply warmly expressed his gratification at her noticing his attempts to celebrate her illustrious ancestor. From this time they became fast friends and frequent correspondents, Burns's letters to her being often on the more serious themes. He was also in the habit of enclosing poems to her, among the more remarkable sent her being Auld Lang Syne, Gae fetch to me a pint of wine, and Farewell, thou fair day.

In his last years she deserted him, and he sent her several letters without ever receiving any explanation. In his last written to her, 12 July 1796, he says that having written so often without obtaining an answer, he would not have written her again but for the fact that he would soon be "beyond that bourne whence no traveller returns". When Currie proposed to write the Life of Burns, Mrs. Dunlop refused to permit her letters to Burns to see the light, but agreed to give a letter of Burns for every one of hers returned. As Burns wrote several to her without obtaining an answer, these were not recovered. She died on 24 May 1815.

She copied extra poems and letters by Burns into an expanded copy of his 1786 Kilmarnock Edition and this The Dunlop Burns is now held at the Rosenbach Museum and Library.

== Family ==
In 1747 Frances Dunlop married John Dunlop of Dunlop, Ayrshire. They had seven sons (including Lieut. Gen. James Dunlop of Dunlop) and six daughters. Burns, in her honour, named his second son Francis Wallace Burns.
