= The Dunlop Burns =

Copy of Burns's published poems with extra pages and poems in the poet's own hand

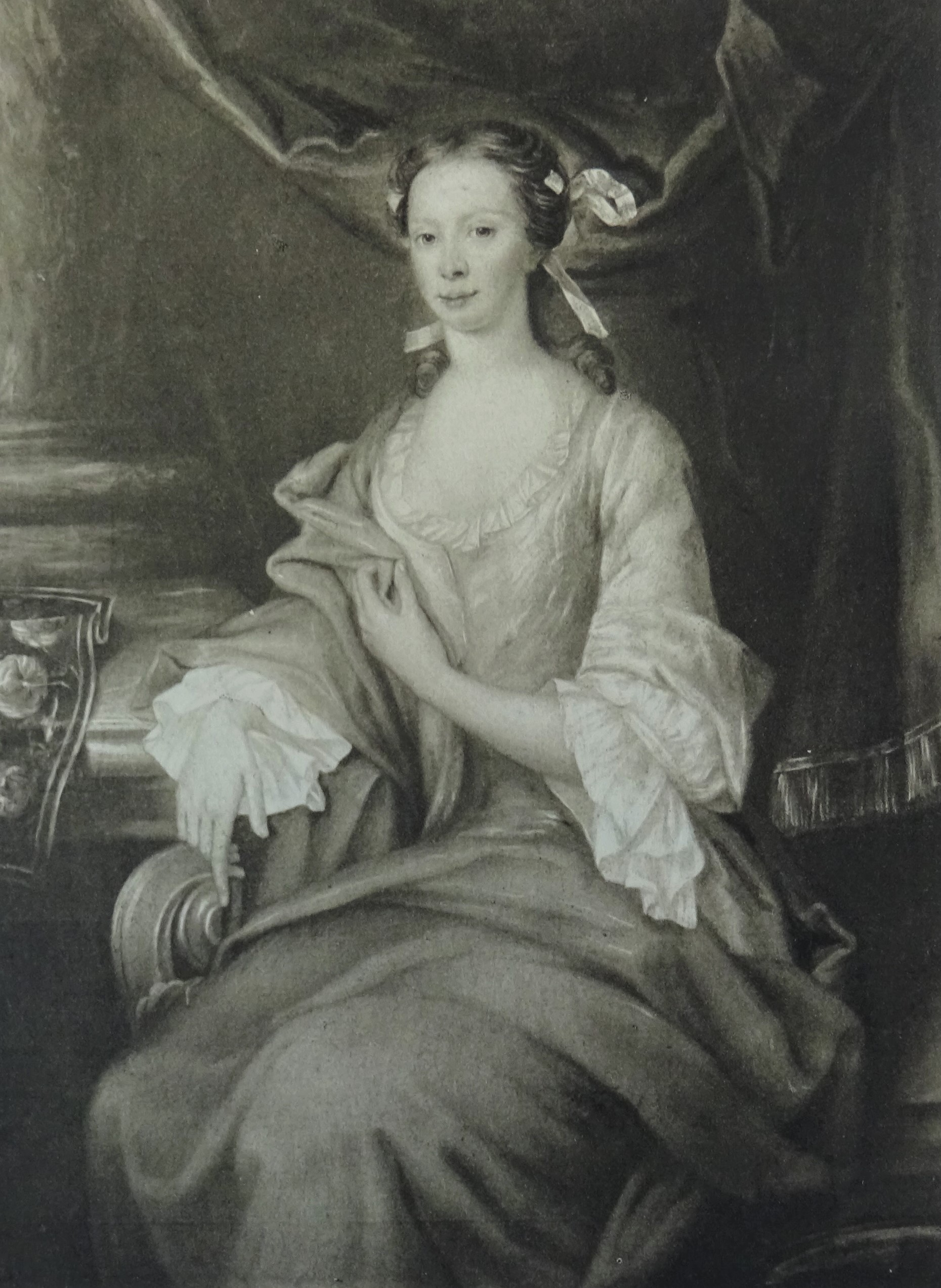
- Mrs Frances Dunlop of Dunlop in 1747
- Author: Robert Burns
- Original title: 1786 First Edition
- Language: Scots
- Genre: Songs and Poems
- Publisher: John Wilson
- Publication place: Scotland

The Dunlop Burns is a copy of Robert Burns's 1786 Poems, Chiefly in the Scottish Dialect with thirty-three extra pages of Robert Burns's works in Frances Dunlop's handwriting bound in, comprising 17 poems and two letters, all dating from between 1787 and 1790.

== Mrs Frances Anna Wallace Dunlop ==
Frances was the eldest daughter of Sir Thomas Wallace of Cragie of that Ilk, 26th Chief of Clan Wallace and his wife Dame Eleanore Agnew. She married John Dunlop of Dunlop in 1748, a man twenty-three years her senior and upon his death in 1785 she was left ill and in a depressed state which was only alleviated by a gift of Robert Burns's poem A Cotter's Saturday Night from Miss Betty McAdam, Daughter of the Laird of Craigengillan.

== Association with Robert Burns ==
Frances wrote to Burns at Mossgiel Farm in Ayrshire for a further six copies and a request that he visit her at Dunlop House at his convenience. He was only able to send five, however this led to a long term friendship and correspondence. He visited her at least five times and stayed at Dunlop House on a few occasions. Burns had more correspondence from Frances than any other person. She acted as a patron, friend and confidant for a number of years until Burns caused an upset which resulted in a cessation of communications from her.

Dr John Moore of London was sent a copy of the Kilmarnock Edition of 1786 by Frances and this led to the well known and informative correspondence with Dr Moore.

The Geddes Burns is a copy of Robert Burns's 1787 Poems, Chiefly in the Scottish Dialect (Edinburgh Edition) second edition, this time with twenty-seven extra pages with twelve poems and songs in Burns's handwriting bound in, and a letter to Catholic Bishop John Geddes from the poet, written at Ellisland Farm.

== The Dunlop Burns ==
The volume is bound in contemporary sheepskin contained within a brown morocco case. The extra pages were added when the volume was bound and are in the back of the book.

=== Provenance of The Dunlop Burns ===
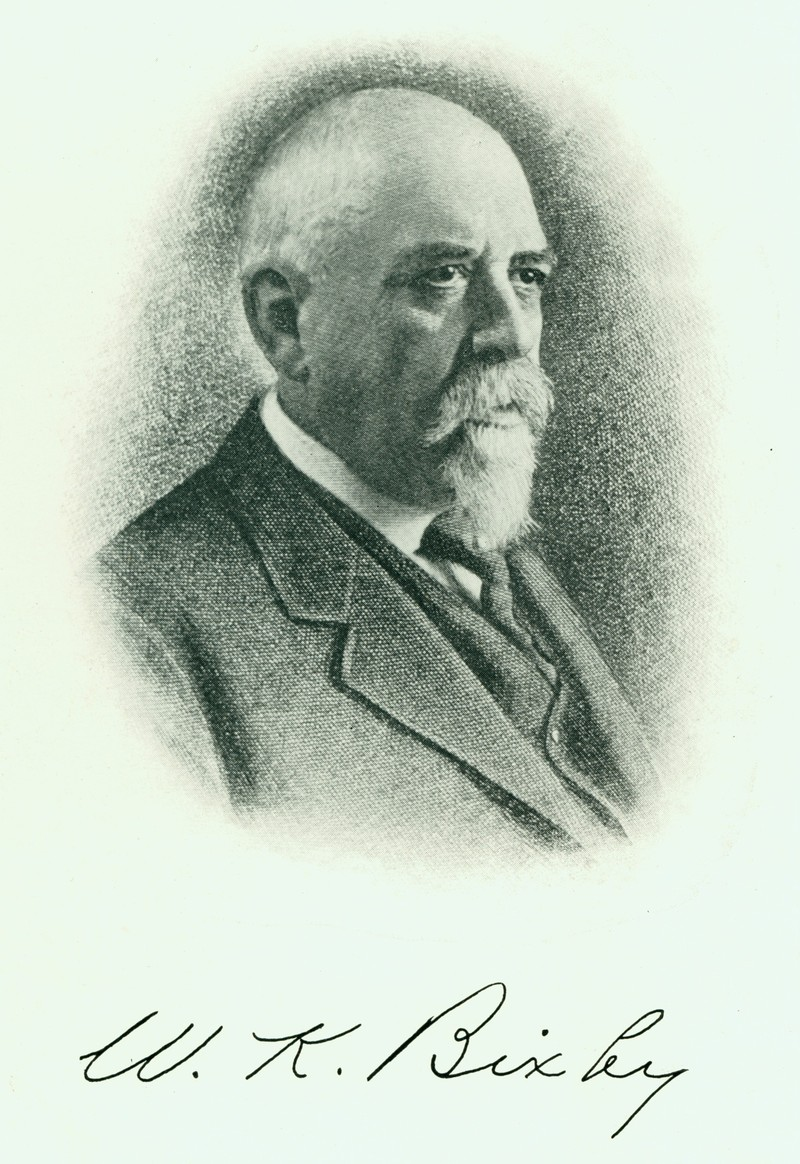
William Keeney Bixby (1857-1931

The volume was first owned by Frances Dunlop who died in 1815. She purchased five copies. The 'Dunlop Burns' was purchased by the wealthy collector William K. Bixby of St Louis, president of the American Car and Foundry Company. In 1929 The Rosenbach Museum and Library of Philadelphia purchased the 'Dunlop Burns' from Mr Bixby and it remains a part of the Rosenbach collections.

== Detail of the additional poems and letters in The Dunlop Burns ==
The following note was written in the front of her personal copy: "The verses copied into the end of this volume of the 1st. edition ever printed of Burns's works are in the hand of Mrs. Dunlop celebrated by the poet as one of those to whose patronage he owed the most. Dunlop 1st. December 1816." Frances had chosen those that she liked best. Many are the only and in certain cases the earliest contemporary manuscript sources for his poems.

=== The poems and letters ===
1. The gloomy night is gathr'ing fast.

2. To Miss L[ogan] with Beattie's Poems.*

3. Stanzas on Death

4. O Thou dread Pow'r who reign'st above.

5. Address to the Unco Guid or Rigidly Righteous

6. [Letter] Addition to the First Duan of The Vision.

7. The Brigs of Ayr.

8. Dedication [of the 1787 edition] to the Noblemen and Gentlemen of the Caledonian Hunt.

9. Admiring Nature in her wildest grace.

10. Clarinda, Mistress of my soul.

11. Anna, thy Charms my bosom fire

12. Sad thy tale, thou idle page.

13. Nae Heathen Name shall I prefix.

14. [Letter] For the Editor of the Evening Courant.

15. New-Year Day To Mrs Dunlop.

16. Ode Sacred to the Memory of Mrs [Oswald].

17. Raving winds about her blowing.

18. Sensibility how charming.

19. Sweet Floweret, pledge of muckle love.

- Burns sent Miss Susan Logan this poem together with a copy of 'The Minstrel' by Dr James Beattie.

Many variants from the standard texts exist amongst these poems, in some cases copied from now lost manuscripts written by Burns himself.

== See also ==
- Poems, Chiefly in the Scottish Dialect (Edinburgh Edition)
- Poems, Chiefly in the Scottish Dialect (Second Edinburgh Edition)
- Poems, Chiefly in the Scottish Dialect (London Edition)
- Glenriddell Manuscripts
- Robert Burns's Commonplace Book 1783–1785
- Robert Burns World Federation
- Burns Clubs
