= The Poetical Works of Janet Little, The Scotch Milkmaid =

1792 collection of poems by Janet Little

Poetry by Janet Little
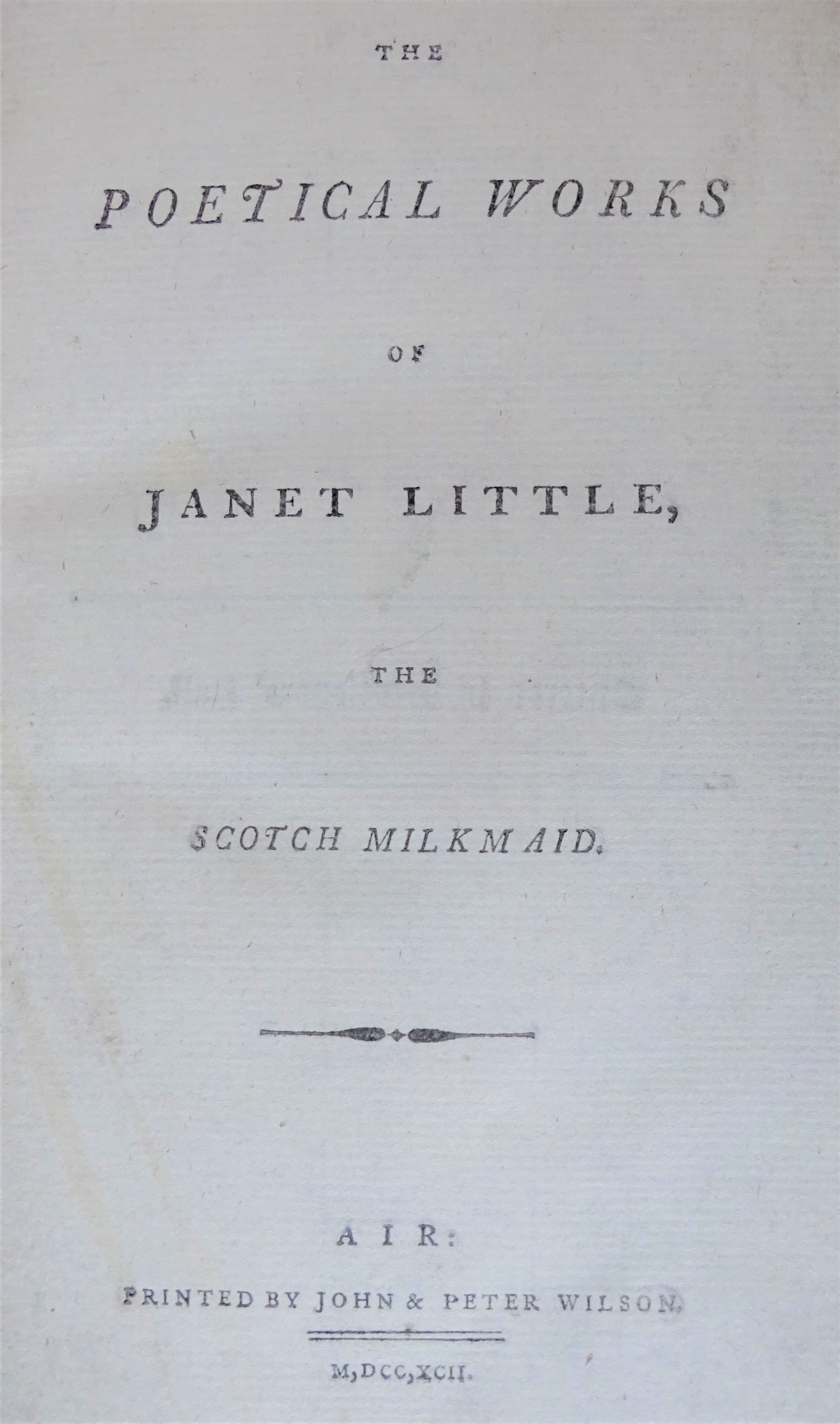
- Janet Little's poetry, 1792 – Title page
- Author: Janet Little
- Language: English
- Genre: Poetry
- Publisher: John and Peter Wilson
- Publication date: 1792
- Publication place: Great Britain

The Poetical Works of Janet Little, The Scotch Milkmaid, often incorrectly rendered as The Poetical Works of Janet Little, The Scottish Milkmaid, was a volume of poems by Janet Little, who worked in a dairy, thus the 'Scotch Milkmaid'. At the time the term 'Scotch' was not specific to whisky.

This publication was a single Octavo volume issue, printed by John and Peter Wilson in the county town of Air (sic). The publication was a success and produced a profit of around £50, now worth around £8,000 (datum 2023), from circa 710 copies that are thought to have been printed as estimated from those subscribed for.

== Life and family ==
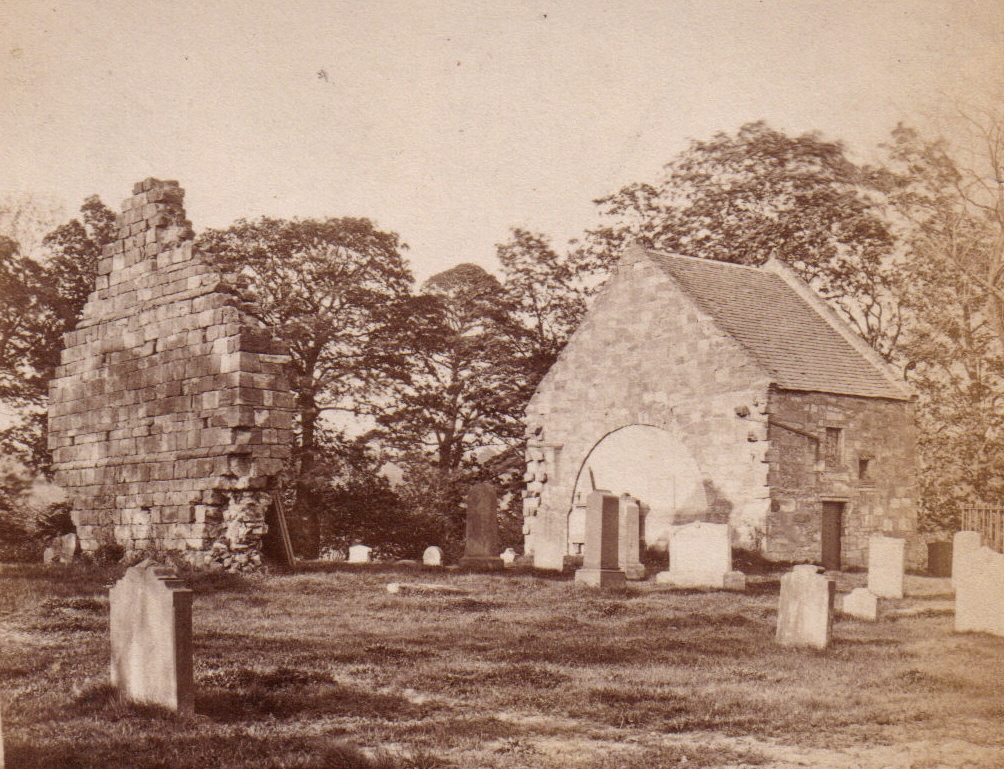
Loudoun Kirk in the 18th century

In 1759, Janet Little was born at Nether Bogside in Ecclefechan, Dumfries and Galloway. Her father was George Little, a man of average manual worker's income. Janet or Jenny Little, later in 1792, Mrs Richmond, came to be in charge of the dairy at Loudoun Castle and married the widower, 18 years her senior, John Richmond, a fellow worker on the Loudoun Estate. In 1813, she died of a 'cramp in the stomach,' childless, at Causey Head Cottage at the age of 54 and was buried at Loudoun Kirk. Five years later in 1819, her widowed husband, John Richmond died, at the age of 78 and was also buried at the kirk. She had been a devoted stepmother to her husband's five children by his previous marriage.

== The Edition and its contents ==
It was the first and only published edition of Little's poems in book form. It is not recorded what price the volume was sold for or exactly how many were printed above the aforementioned 710 subscription copies. Frances Dunlop of Dunlop House was her patron and her wide range of social contacts helped to ensure the success of the enterprise.

Rather than to Robert Burns or Mrs Dunlop, the volume was dedicated to the "Right Hon., Flora Countess of Loudoun" stating that "THE FOLLOWING POEMS ARE WITH PERMISSION, HUMBLY INSCRIBED, BY YOUR LADYSHIP'S EVER GRATEFUL, AND OBEDIENT HUMBLE SERVANT, JANET LITTLE." Flora Campbell was only in her twelfth year at the time and under the guardianship of Lady Dumfries. Janet reportedly had hoped to dedicate the volume to James Boswell, however it was he who advised Janet to dedicate it instead to Flora, a titled lady.

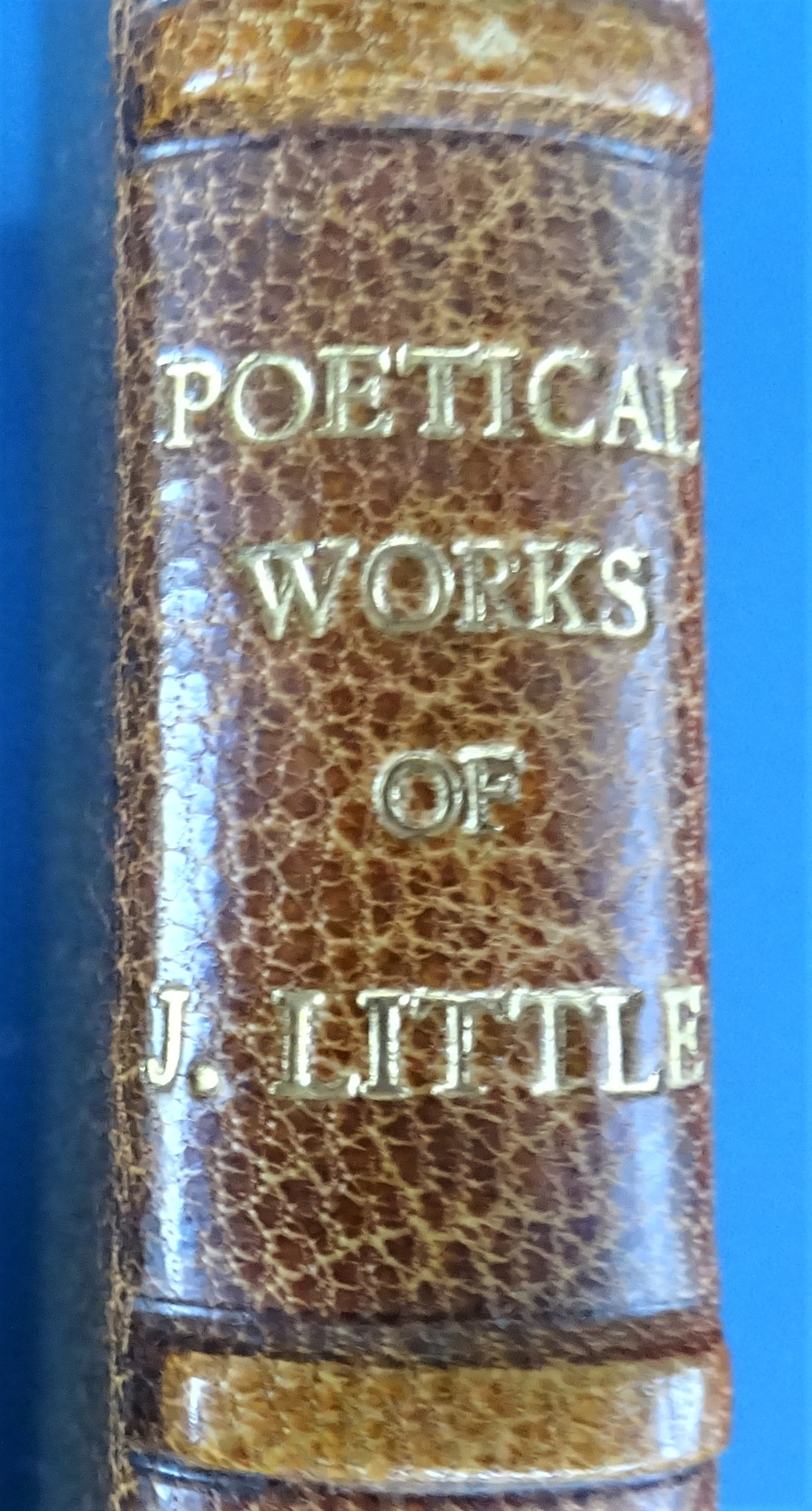
Label of Janet Little's Poetry Volume

'The Poetical Works' were printed in 8vo or demy octavo and they were written in English and the book does not include a glossary or 'dictionary' of any description. The commonly used hand made 'chain and line' or laid paper was chosen for the text and no watermarks are present. The pages bear little in the way of decoration apart from the poem title pages that generally have a double ruled parallel device above and one of three styles of basic linear fleuron below.

The 'Subscribers Names' occupy the best part of 16 over 17 pages and include many from the aristocracy, other land owners, twenty-two copies to Frances Dunlop's family and other individuals to the total of circa 600 people. A fair number took more than one copy, including booksellers, totally circa 124 additional volumes. The Countess of Loudoun took twelve copies. Robert Burns wrote to Mrs Dunlop to say that ".. I shall now set about & fill up my subscription-bill." The subscribers were listed with the aristocracy taking precedence followed by lawyers, members of the armed forces, teachers, etc.

Alexander Wilson (1766-1813), the 'Pedlar Poet' was praised by Mrs Dunlop for his 'disinterested, generous conduct' to Janet, he later became a famous ornithologist in America.

A copy belonging to W. Craib Angus was displayed in the 1896 'Burns Exhibition' held at the Royal Glasgow Institute of the Fine Arts.

=== The influence of Robert Burns ===
After working elsewhere, Janet eventually entered service with Frances Dunlop at Dunlop House in East Ayrshire, where she became familiar with Robert Burns, a regular visitor, and was a great admirer of his poetry.

Janet moved with Mrs Dunlop to Loudoun Castle which was being rented by Mrs Susan Henri and her husband James. Susan was Frances Dunlop's second daughter. Mrs Dunlop wrote to Burns saying that "Her outside promises nothing; her mind only bursts forth on paper."

Janet first wrote to Burns on 12 July 1789, but it is not recorded if Burns ever replied. She composed the poem "An Epistle to Mr Robert Burns."

In 1791, before her poems were published, she made the journey to Ellisland Farm, partly to visit her relations, but Burns had that day broken his arm when his horse fell. Janet spoke briefly to him at Ellilsand and reported back to Mrs Dunlop that he was in so much pain he could not lie down, but was forced to spend a night sitting in a chair. She composed and published "On a Visit to Mr.Burns" that recorded the incident.

During one four day stay at Dunlop House, Burns discussed Janet Little's poetry and he objected to reading all of Janet's poems, Frances Dunlop later writing to him saying "How did I upraid my own conceited folly ... that ever subjected one of mine to so haughty and imperious critic." Burns subscribed to only one copy of her poems.

It is recorded that Burns's natural daughter, Elizabeth 'Betty' Burns, visited Janet at Loudoun Castle shortly before her death in March 1813.

=== Printing Errors ===
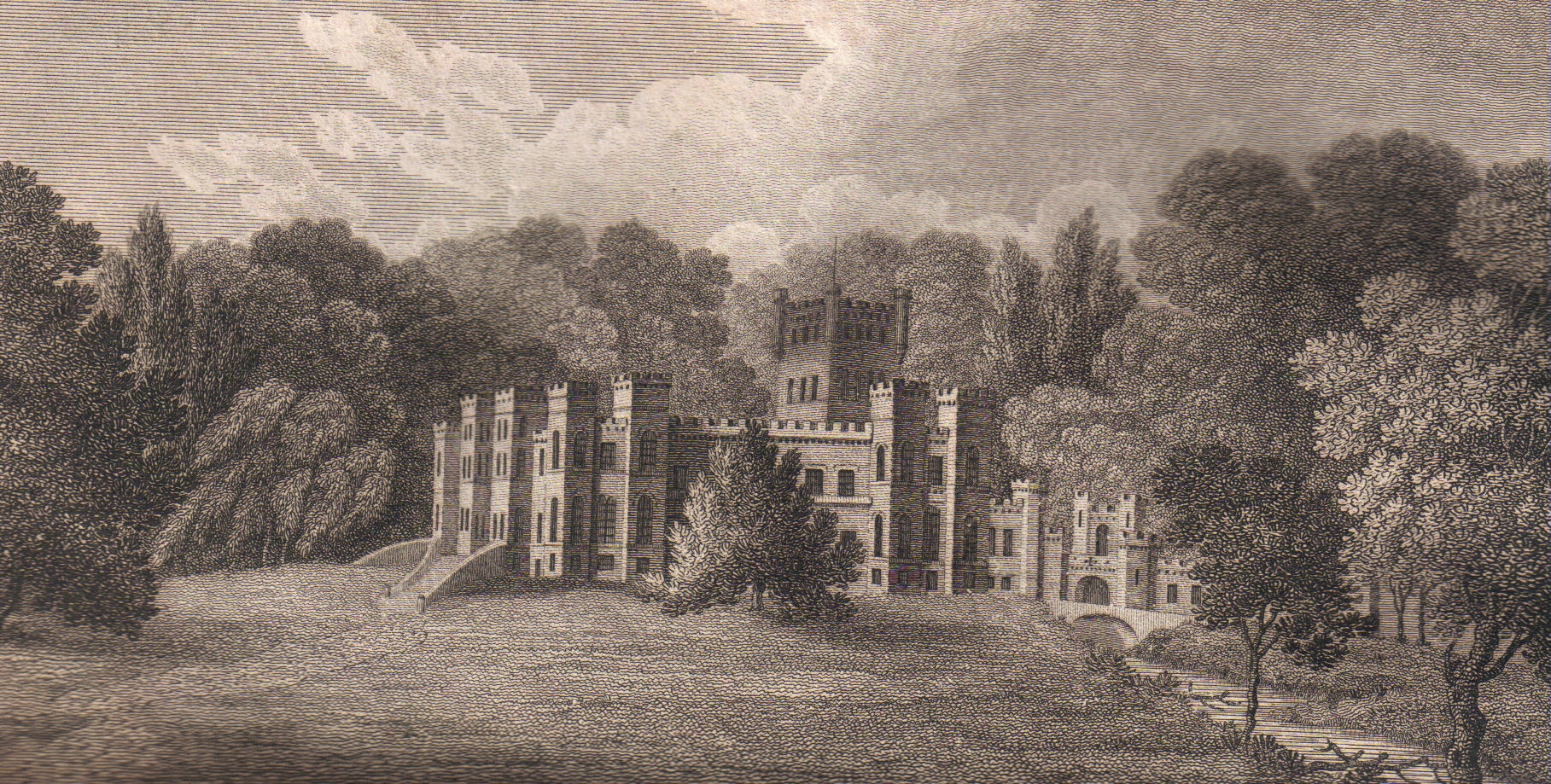
Loudoun Castle, Janet's place of work

An Errata is provided on page 24 after the list of subscribers. The pagination of pages 26, 27 and 28 is enclosed in a double bracket, unlike any other pages in the book, other than what should be 'Page 30,' which is again marked as 'Page 26'. Another page, not bracketed is given as 'Page 28'. Page numbers do not appear on pages that have poem titles. As a result the book has four extra pages and is therefore 211 pages long and not 207. The 'Contents' page gives Page 205 for the last poem however it begins on page 206.

=== Publishers ===
A subscription form was printed, however none are known to survived. John and Peter Wilson were the printers, then based in Ayr, having moved from Kilmarnock. John Wilson was also printer to Robert Burns, David Sillar and John Lapraik

== Manuscripts ==
After Janet's death in 1813 a number of manuscripts, some on a religious theme, were found, some complete and others half finished. Some of her religious poems were eventually published.

One reference states that she also wrote in Gaelic and that she did not use accepted pronunciations in her writings. She wrote an unpublished poem on the birth of twin sons to Mrs. Hamilton, wife of the Loudoun Estate factor, John Hamilton.

== The poems of the 1792 Janet Little Edition ==
1. To Hope
2. On Happiness
3. Upon a young Lady's leaving Loudoun Castle
4. The fickle pair
5. To a Lady, a Patroness of the Muses, on her Recovery from Sickness
6. The Lottery Ticket
7. The Month's Love
8. Damon and Philander
9. Colin and Alexis
10. Almedia and Flavia
11. On the Spring
12. William and Mary
13. Lothario
14. Amanda, An Elegy on the Death of Mrs. ______, personating her Husband
15. Celia and her Looking Glass
16. The Unfortunate Rambler
17. Lucina, an Elegy
18. The Envied Kiss
19. The Young Man's Resolution
20. To a young Man under Sentence of Death for Forgery, from his Mistress
21. On an Unlooked for Separation from a Friend
22. Written January first, 1792
23. On a visit to Mr. Burns
24. Given to a Lady who asked me to write a Poem
25. Epistle to Nell, wrote from Loudoun Castle
26. Nell's Answer
27. Another Epistle to Nell
28. An Epistle to a Lady
29. From Snipe, a favourite Dog, to his Master
30. On the Death of J_____ H_______, Esq. (James Henri)
31. On the Birth of J_____ H_______, Esq.'s Son (James Henri)
32. On a Gentleman's proposing to travel 300 Miles to see J_____ H______, Esq.'s Son (James Henri)
33. Verses written on a Foreigner's visiting the Grave of a Swiss Gentleman, buried among the Descendents of Sir William Wallace, Guardian of Scotland in the thirteenth Century
34. From Philander to Eumenes
35. Sylvia and Amanda
36. The Captivated Soldier
37. On reading Lady Mary Montague and Mrs Rowe's Letters
38. Upon a young Lady's breaking a Looking Glass
39. An Acrostic upon a young Woman, by her Lover
40. An extemporary Acrostic
41. An Epistle to Mr Robert Burns
42. To my Aunty
43. On Halloween
44. On seeing Mr. _______ Baking Cakes
45. A poem on Contentment
46. Aleanzar
47. Alonzo to Delia
48. Delia to Alonzo
49. From Delia to Alonzo, who had sent a slighting Epistle
50. From Flavia to Carlos
51. To Nell when at Moffat Well
52. A Young Lady's Lamentation for the LOss of her Sister by Marriage
53. The Rival Swains
54. To a Lady who sent the Author some Paper, with a Reading of Sillar's Poems

Note - the archaic 'f' like representations of 'S', in use at Janet's and Burns' time, have been altered here to a simple 'S'.

( ) – The missing personal name from the poem.

Janet, as illustrated above, used a solid line to avoid printing the names of people, giving no clue to the number of letters with initials only.

== See also ==
- Poems by David Sillar
