= 1931–32 Scottish Cup =

Tournament details
- Country: Scotland

Final positions
- Champions: Rangers
- Runners-up: Kilmarnock

The 1931–32 Scottish Cup was the 54th staging of Scotland's most prestigious football knockout competition. The Cup was won by Rangers who defeated Kilmarnock in the replayed final.

== Fourth round ==
Team One	Team Two	Score
Rangers	Motherwell	2–0
Clyde	Hamilton Academicals	0–2
Dunfermline Athletic	Kilmarnock	1–3
Airdrieonians	Partick Thistle	4–1

== Semi-finals ==
26 March 1932

Kilmarnock	3–2	Airdrieonians

Firhill
Attendance: 28,138
Referee: P. Craigmyle

26 March 1932

Rangers	5–2	Hamilton Academical
James Marshall (2); Sam English (2); Sandy Archibald

Celtic Park, Glasgow
Attendance: 50,000
Referee: H. Watson

== Final ==
16 April 1932

Rangers	1–1	Kilmarnock
McPhail 41'		Maxwell 51'

Hampden Park, Glasgow
Attendance: 112,000
Referee: P. Craigmyle

=== Replay ===
20 April 1932

Rangers	3–0	Kilmarnock
Fleming; English; McPhail

Hampden Park, Glasgow
Attendance: 104,600

=== Teams ===
Kilmarnock:
GK	William Bell
RB	James Leslie
LB	Joe Nibloe
RH	Hugh Morton
CH	Tom Smith
LH	Jock McEwan
OR	Willie Connell
IR	Jim Muir
CF	Bud Maxwell
IL	James Duncan
OL	Jock Aitken
Replay:	Unchanged

Rangers:
GK	Tom Hamilton
RB	Dougie Gray
LB	Bob McAuley
RH	Davie Meiklejohn
CH	Jimmy Simpson
LH	George Brown
OR	Sandy Archibald
IR	James Marshall
CF	Sam English
IL	Bob McPhail
OL	Alan Morton
Replay:	Jimmy Fleming replaced Morton

== See also ==
- 1929 Scottish Cup Final – played between the same teams
- 1931–32 in Scottish football
