= James Maxwell (footballer, born 1887) =

Scottish footballer

Personal information
- Full name: James Morton Maxwell
- Date of birth: 26 July 1887
- Place of birth: New Cumnock, Scotland
- Date of death: 21 April 1917 (aged 29)
- Place of death: Istabulat, Iraq
- Position: Outside right

Youth career
- Kilmarnock Shawbank
- Petershill Juniors

Senior career*
Years	Team	Apps	(Gls)
1904	Newcastle United	0	(0)
1904–1907	Kilmarnock	50	(13)
1907–1908	The Wednesday	27	(6)
1908–1909	Woolwich Arsenal	2	(0)
1909–????	Hurlford		
–1910	Galston		
1910–1911	Carlisle United		
1911–1912	Lanemark		
1912–1916	Kilmarnock	15	(2)
1913–1914	→ Nithsdale Wanderers (loan)		

International career
1907	Scottish League XI	1	(0)
- * Club domestic league appearances and goals

James Morton Maxwell (26 July 1887 – 21 April 1917) was a Scottish professional footballer who played in the Scottish League for Kilmarnock as an outside right. He also played in the Football League for The Wednesday and Woolwich Arsenal. He made one appearance for the Scottish League XI.

== Personal life ==
Maxwell was married with two children, one of whom, his son of the same name, nicknamed 'Bud', also became a footballer. Maxwell served as a lance corporal in the Seaforth Highlanders during the First World War and died of wounds suffered during the Battle of Istabulat on 21 April 1917. He is commemorated on the Basra Memorial. His elder brother Thomas was killed in Pas-de-Calais, France in 1918.

== Career statistics ==
Appearances and goals by club, season and competition
Club	Season	League			National Cup		Total	
Club	Season	Division	Apps	Goals	Apps	Goals	Apps	Goals
Kilmarnock	1904–05	Scottish First Division	9	5	2	1	11	6
Kilmarnock	1905–06	Scottish First Division	17	3	2	0	19	3
Kilmarnock	1906–07	Scottish First Division	24	5	3	1	27	6
Kilmarnock	Total		50	13	7	2	57	15
The Wednesday	1906–07	First Division	7	2	0	0	7	2
The Wednesday	1907–08	First Division	20	4	0	0	20	4
The Wednesday	Total		27	6	0	0	27	6
Woolwich Arsenal	1908–09	First Division	2	0	0	0	2	0
Kilmarnock	1912–13	Scottish First Division	5	1	3	2	8	3
Kilmarnock	Total		55	14	10	4	65	18
Career total			84	20	10	4	94	24
