= Loudoun Academy, Galston =

Coordinates: 55.60786°N 4.38045°W

Loudoun Academy
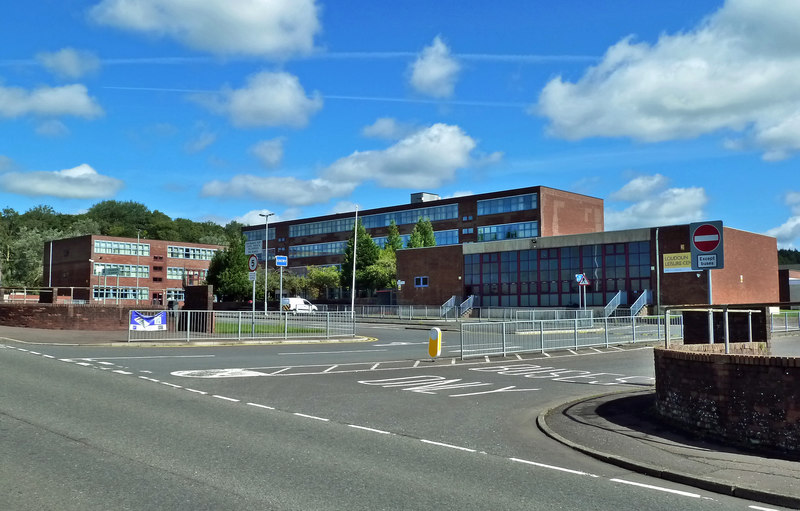
- School badge School building

Location
- Glasgow Road; Galston, East Ayrshire; Scotland

Information
- Type: Comprehensive school
- Motto: Spe Et Fiducia (Hope and Trust)
- Established: 1970
- Oversight: East Ayrshire Council
- Head Teacher: Stephen Cowan
- Year Groups: S1-S6
- Gender: Boys and girls
- Enrollment: 878 (at September 2023)
- Houses: Arran, Harris, Hoy and Skye
- Colours: Red & black
- Website: School Website

Loudoun Academy is a secondary school in the outskirts of Galston, East Ayrshire, in Scotland serving the Loudoun district which includes the Irvine Valley, Kilmarnock, and surrounding rural areas of East Ayrshire. The school was built in 1971. The current enrolment as of July 2022 was 926.

In 2022, Loudoun Academy was ranked as the 201st best performing state school in Scotland, an increase from its 2021 ranking where it was placed at 216th. In 2025, it was revealed that Loudoun Academy was one of four schools in Ayrshire that hadn’t been inspected since 2009.

== History and staffing ==
The position of Rector was held by Rob Findlay until 1994. Subsequently, Head Teachers of Loudoun Academy have been as follows:

1994-2009 Brian Johnston
2009-2012 Peter Flood
2012-2018 Linda McAulay-Griffiths
2018-2022 Scott Robertson
2022-2025 David Falconer
2025- Stephen Cowan

== Notable alumni ==
- Alan Brown (born 1970), Scottish National Party Member of Parliament (MP)

== See also ==
- List of schools in Scotland
