= Bud Maxwell =

Scottish footballer (1913–1990)

Personal information
- Full name: James Morton Maxwell
- Date of birth: 15 January 1913
- Place of birth: Kilmarnock, Scotland
- Date of death: 22 April 1990 (aged 77)
- Place of death: Poole, Dorset
- Height: 5 ft 7 1/2 in (1.71 m)
- Position: Centre forward

Youth career
- 1929–1930: Kilmarnock

Senior career*
Years	Team	Apps	(Gls)
1930–1934	Kilmarnock	126	(103)
1934–1938	Preston North End	129	(60)
1939	Barnsley	3	(4)
1939–1940	→ Kilmarnock (wartime guest)		
1943	→ Morton (wartime guest)		
1946	Shrewsbury Town	13	(10)

International career
1933	Scottish League XI	1	(0)
- * Club domestic league appearances and goals

James Morton "Bud" Maxwell (15 January 1913 – 22 April 1990) was a Scottish footballer who played as a centre forward for Kilmarnock and Preston North End.

== Club career ==
Born in Kilmarnock, James Morton Maxwell's father of the same name was also a footballer prior to his death in World War I, at which time his son was four years old. 'Bud' became known for his skills at school and was selected for Scotland at that level, thereafter becoming an apprentice at hometown club Kilmarnock, also working at a shoe manufacturer.

Maxwell quickly emerged as a prolific goalscorer (displacing Peerie Cunningham whose record was also strong) and becoming Kilmarnock's second highest goalscorer of their history in just four seasons, with 103 goals in 126 League games plus 19 goals in 21 Scottish Cup games. Aged 18, he played in the 1932 Scottish Cup Final against Rangers. The first game was drawn, with Maxwell scoring the only goal for Killie. He also played in the replay, which Kilmarnock lost.

Maxwell signed for Preston North End in 1934 and maintained an impressive strike rate, scoring 60 goals in 129 league matches and finishing top goalscorer in 1934–35 with 26 goals, and 1935–36 with 19. He also played in the victorious Preston team at the 1938 FA Cup Final.

However, he suffered increasingly from knee injuries and was sold to Barnsley in 1939 just before the outbreak of World War II, returning to Kilmarnock in unofficial competitions where he scored his 124th goal on his final appearance for the club on 16 March 1940.

He served with the Royal Navy throughout the war, mainly in the North Atlantic on submarine hunting/convoy escort duty. He played as a guest for Greenock Morton in the wartime Scottish Southern League a number of times while on leave from the navy.

After the war, he trained with Preston but his registration was still held by Barnsley, who would not allow him to sign for a divisional rival; instead he joined Shrewsbury Town of the Midland League for a short spell lasting until the end of 1946.

== International career ==
While at Kilmarnock, Maxwell was selected once for the Scottish Football League XI in September 1933. The SFL lost 3–0 to the Irish League XI in Belfast, and of the 11 picked by the Scots (seven of whom were making their debuts), only one was selected again. He was on a reserve list for a Scotland fixture a few months later, but never made a full international appearance. His father had also played for the SFL XI on a single occasion (1907).

== Honours ==
Preston North End

- FA Cup: 1937–38
