= James Leslie (footballer) =

Scottish footballer

Personal information
- Full name: James Walker Leslie
- Date of birth: 12 July 1908
- Place of birth: Galston, Scotland
- Date of death: 15 June 1980 (aged 71)
- Place of death: Galston, Scotland
- Height: 5 ft 11 in (1.80 m)
- Position: Right back

Senior career*
Years	Team	Apps	(Gls)
1925–1926	Newmilns		
1926–1938	Kilmarnock	202	(3)
- * Club domestic league appearances and goals

James Walker Leslie (12 July 1908 – 15 June 1980) was a Scottish footballer who played as a right back. His only club at senior level was Kilmarnock where he spent 12 years, though he played in only 10 matches in his first four years at Rugby Park and was not involved in the run when they won the Scottish Cup in 1929; however he was a regular by the time they reached its final again in 1932, this time losing out to Rangers after a replay. He missed almost the entire 1933–34 season due to injury, but signed a new contract after recovering. Leslie left Kilmarnock in 1938 and was briefly on the books at Queen of the South at the end of that year, but did not play any official matches for them.
