= Hugh Morton (footballer) =

Scottish footballer (1902–1980)

Personal information
- Full name: Hugh Auld Morton
- Date of birth: 25 November 1902
- Place of birth: Newmilns, Scotland
- Date of death: 23 August 1980 (aged 77)
- Place of death: Darvel, Scotland
- Position: Right half

Senior career*
Years	Team	Apps	(Gls)
–	Darvel		
1922–1932	Kilmarnock	304	(16)
1932–1933	Morton	13	(1)
1933–1937	Kilmarnock	36	(0)
Total		353	(17)

International career
1928	Scottish League XI	1	(0)
1929	Scotland	2	(0)
- * Club domestic league appearances and goals

Hugh Auld Morton (25 November 1902 – 23 August 1980) was a Scottish footballer who played for Kilmarnock and Scotland, mainly at right half. He took part in the 1929 Scottish Cup Final in which Killie claimed the trophy by beating Rangers, and in the 1932 final, a defeat to the same opposition after a replay. He then fell out of favour and spent most of the 1932–33 season at Morton, but was then re-signed by Kilmarnock and finished his career there.

Two other players named Hugh Morton, both also from the Newmilns / Darvel area, featured for Kilmarnock in the 1900s but neither was a close relative, nor was teammate John Morton (a goalkeeper).
