= Cessnock Castle =

Coordinates: 55.5904°N 4.3646°W

Cessnock Castle is a 15th-century keep greatly enlarged into a baronial mansion, about 1 mile (1.6 km) south east of Galston, East Ayrshire, Scotland, and 0.75 miles (1.21 km) south of the River Irvine.

== History ==
The earliest record of this property shows that a building existed in 1296. The Campbells first owned the property, and it was owned thereafter by the families of Dick, Wallace, and Scott, before being acquired by the De Fresnes in 1946. Since the mid 1990s it has been owned by the Cogley family, who reversed decades of neglect, and acquired other significant local land holdings. It remains their main residence.

Mary, Queen of Scots resorted here after the defeat of Langside. It was also visited by George Wishart, John Knox and Robert Burns.

== Structure ==
The massive keep, which stands in a ravine of the Burnanne has three storeys, and an attic, to which a large mansion has been added, making the building U-plan. The tower has a gabled roof, which is corbie-stepped. The parapets have been demolished, although bartizans remain. There is a vaulted basement. The first floor would have housed the hall, while private chambers were in the floors above. A painted ceiling dating from the late 16th century remains in the great hall in the newer part. A modern wall forms the four side of a rectangle.

There was a bell tower on the north west gable end of the tower but this has been demolished. The New South Wales Hunter Valley town of Cessnock was named after the castle when it was settled in the 1820s.

== Traditions ==
While Mary, Queen of Scots, was at Cessnock one of her ladies died, and she is said to haunt the castle. It is also said to be haunted by John Knox.

== See also ==
- Castles in Great Britain and Ireland
- List of castles in Scotland
