= Loudoun =

Coordinates: 55.608°N 4.329°W

Loudoun: Scottish Gaelic: Lughdan
- Location within East Ayrshire
- Population: 6,418 (Census 2001)
- Language: English; Scots
- OS grid reference: NS533372
- Council area: East Ayrshire
- Lieutenancy area: Ayrshire and Arran
- Country: Scotland
- Sovereign state: United Kingdom
- Police: Scotland
- Fire: Scottish
- Ambulance: Scottish
- UK Parliament: Kilmarnock and Loudoun
- Scottish Parliament: Kilmarnock and Irvine Valley

Loudoun (Scottish Gaelic: Lughdan) applies to both a parish and earldom in East Ayrshire, Scotland. The latter title is now honorific, and both the parish and earldom had different landed extents attached to them. Loudoun lies between five and ten miles east of Kilmarnock. The parish roughly encompasses the northern half of the Upper-Irvine Valley and borders Galston Parish (which encompasses the remainder of The Valley) at the River Irvine.

The historical Loudoun parish shares borders with six other parishes. To the south lies the parish of Galston, which of all the surrounding parishes, has the strongest local links to Loudoun, being as the two parishes share strong historical and social links, as well as sharing public services. Some parts of Galston parish comprised parts of the historical Earldom of Loudoun. Otherwise, Loudoun shares borders with the parishes of Avondale (east), Eaglesham (north), East Kilbride (north-east), Fenwick (north-west) and Kilmarnock (west).

Within the Loudoun territory can be found the towns of Darvel and Newmilns, alongside Loudoun Hill, Loudoun Castle, Loudoun Kirk and Loudoun Academy. Notably, claims that Greenholm, Priestland and the town of Galston itself lie within Loudoun are erroneous, as all three lie south of the River Irvine, in the parish of Galston. This may in some part be because Loudoun Academy and surrounding housing hold Galston postcodes.

Loudoun also contained two villages abandoned during the last century, Alton and Loudoun Village.

== Etymology ==
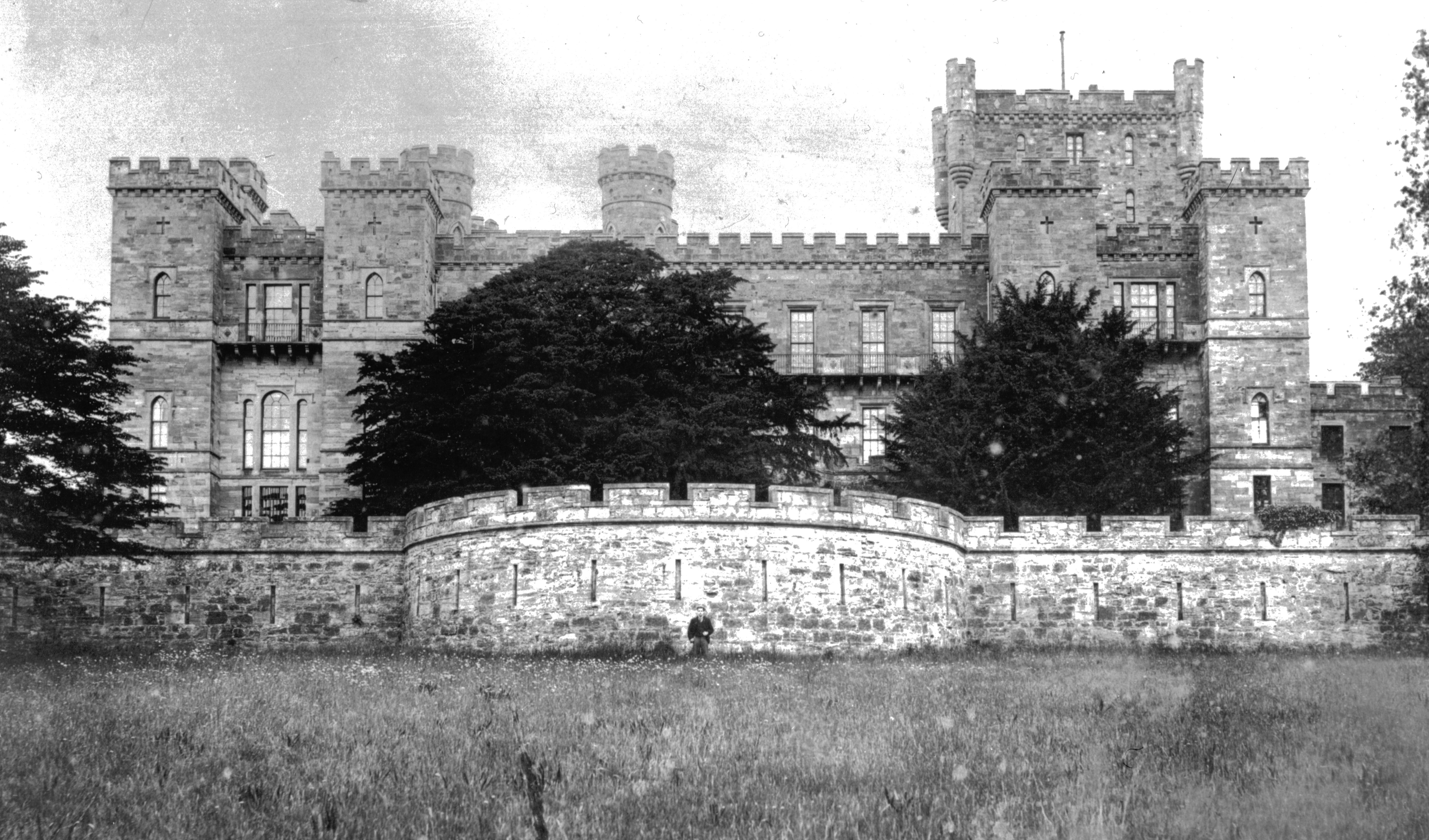
Loudoun Castle

Various suggestions have been put forward as to the origins of the name Loudoun. An older antiquarian hypothesis is that the name was originally used in reference to Loudoun Hill - being a combination of two Scots words lowe and dun, which roughly translates as fire hill. However, 'dun' in this context would strictly refer to a site of Iron Age or Early Medieval, Celtic-type fortification, often situated on easily defensible hills. This is historically incompatible in a linguistic construction sense with the Old English low/lowe, and so this idea is not logically sound.

A more secure past analysis, which also centres on the hill locus, is Lugudunon, translating from Old Celtic as the fortified residence of Lugh or Lugus. The latter is a pan-Celtic deity of light (or darkness) associated with prominent hills, solar events, or seasonal changes. It has also been speculated that the name derives from the Celtic word, Loddan for marshy ground, although this place-name does not seem justified as a distinct district identity, given it was a generic topographical descriptor.

As such a landmark as Loudoun Hill does not have any other older name preserved, as should be expected for this prominent example alongside much less conspicuous hills nearby, then it encourages the idea the name is likelier to derive from the hill, making the Lugudunon theory likelier, and certainly that favoured by place-name linguists. This is especially the case because other Loudoun Hills exist elsewhere in Europe dedicated to this deity, especially the prominent example in France

== History ==
Whilst the origins of Loudoun's name may remain debatable, it is known that by 1186 the name was used for the surrounding area, for in that year a Royal Charter was issued that granted the Lands of Lowdun to James de Lambinus. At this time the family name was changed to de Lowdun, with the Loudoun family building Loudoun Castle, Loudoun Kirk and The Keep (in Newmilns) over subsequent centuries.

Subsequently, the Loudoun family married in to the Crawford family and in doing so inherited the hereditary title 'Sheriff of Ayr'. It has been put forward that William Wallace was a relative of the Loudouns, through his mother Margaret Crawford (sister of the 5th Baron, Reginald Crawford), although this claim has been disputed.

The remains of Loudoun Kirk and its kirkyard, as well as the ruins of the Georgian Castellated 'Loudoun Castle', form important historical adjuncts in the vicinity of Galston.

== William Wallace ==
According to Blind Harry writing in the 15th century, Wallace was said to have fought a battle at or near Loudoun Hill, during the Scottish Wars of Independence. This claim is largely disputed by historians. Indeed, all prominent chronicles that document the activities and battles of William Wallace are silent on the subject, where they would be expected to mention the event if it were true. The historically attested Battle of Loudoun Hill occurred on 10 May 1307, being fought between the Scottish forces of Robert Bruce and the English forces of Aymer de Valence. Bruce's forces prevailed and whilst the combined forces of both armies probably totalled no more than about 4,000 men, the result is viewed as an important step towards Bruce's eventual victory in the Wars of Independence.

== See also ==
- John Campbell, 1st Earl of Loudoun
- John Nisbet
