= Janet Little =

Scottish poet

Janet Little, later Janet Richmond, (1759 – 15 March 1813), known as The Scotch Milkmaid, was a Scottish poet who wrote in the Scots language.

== Biography ==
Born in Ecclefechan, Little enjoyed a "common education" and, as an assistant to local clergy, was able to exercise her love of reading and writing. By the 1780s she had gained a reputation as a "rustic poetess". Her employer, Mrs Frances Dunlop, recommended her poetry to Robert Burns. Burns, who had recently been inundated by a swarm of untalented imitators, was initially wary, but he later assisted Mrs Dunlop in publishing Little's poetry.

She was employed by Frances Dunlop's daughter in the estate's dairy whilst she rented Loudoun Castle near Galston in the Irvine Valley. She published a small volume of her poems in 1792 'The Poetical Works of Janet Little, The Scotch Milkmaid' that, unlike others such as John Lapraik and David Sillar, was a financial success with an impressive list of subscribers, thanks to Frances.

Little's most notable patron, apart from Burns and Mrs Dunlop, was James Boswell. Some time in the early 1790s, she married John Richmond (died 1819), a widower more than eighteen years her senior. Little continued to write until her death in 1813 of "a cramp in the stomach". She was buried at Loudoun Kirk in the grounds of the mausoleum of the Campbells of Loudoun Castle.

James Paterson who wrote a short biography of her in 1840 describes her as "a very tall masculine woman, with dark hair, and features somewhat coarse".

=== Attempt to contact Robert Burns ===
Little wrote to Burns in 1789, saying:

"As I had the pleasure of perusing your poems, I felt a partiality for the author, which I should not have experienced had you been in a more dignified station".

She also wrote: "I hope you will pardon my boldness in this: my hand trembles while I write to you, conscious of my unworthiness of what I would most earnestly solicit. viz. Your favour and friendship; yet, hoping you will show yourself possessed of as much generosity and good nature as will prevent your exposing what may justly be found liable to censure in this measure, I shall take the liberty to subscribe myself. P.S. If you would condescend to honour me with a few lines from your hand, I would take it as particular favour".

It is not known for certain whether Burns responded to her and her request; however, she made the long journey to visit Burns at his Ellisland Farm only to find that he was away on his Excise duties and then that he had fallen from his horse and had broken an arm. He had mentioned her in a letter to Frances Dunlop, saying that her epistle was "a very ingenious, but modest composition".

== Selected poems ==
- 'On a Visit to Mr. Burns' (1791)
- 'An Epistle to a Lady'
- 'Given to A Lady Who Asked me to Write a Poem' (1792)
- 'On Halloween' (1792)
- 'To My Aunty'
- 'Upon a Young Lady's Breaking a Looking Glass'

== See also ==
- List of 18th-century British working-class writers
