= Hugh Morton, Baron Morton of Shuna =

The Right Honourable The Lord Morton of Shuna
- Lord Morton of Shuna in 1988

Senator of the College of Justice
- In office 1988–1995

Hugh Drennan Baird Morton, Baron Morton of Shuna (10 April 1930 – 26 April 1995) was a Scottish lawyer, judge and politician.

== Biography ==
Born to Scottish missionaries in Mukden, Morton was educated at the Glasgow Academy and Glasgow University, where he read Law, obtaining a First and a Distinction.

Originally a solicitor, he was admitted to the Scottish bar in 1965 and was appointed Queen's Counsel in 1974. He was a Crown Prosecutor for nearly 10 years, from 1967 to 1971 and from 1974 to 1979.

In 1985, Morton was made a life peer, as Baron Morton of Shuna, of Stockbridge in the District of the City of Edinburgh. He sat on the Labour benches, as Labour's legal affairs spokesman in the House of Lords.

In 1988 he was appointed a Senator of the College of Justice, where he remained critical of the law's failings. In two murder trials, he acquitted the accused on the grounds that there was insufficient evidence to send the case to the jury.

He died of cancer in Edinburgh in 1995.
