= Galston, East Ayrshire =

Coordinates: 55.60037°N 4.3798°W

Galston: Scottish Gaelic: Baile nan Gall
- Town
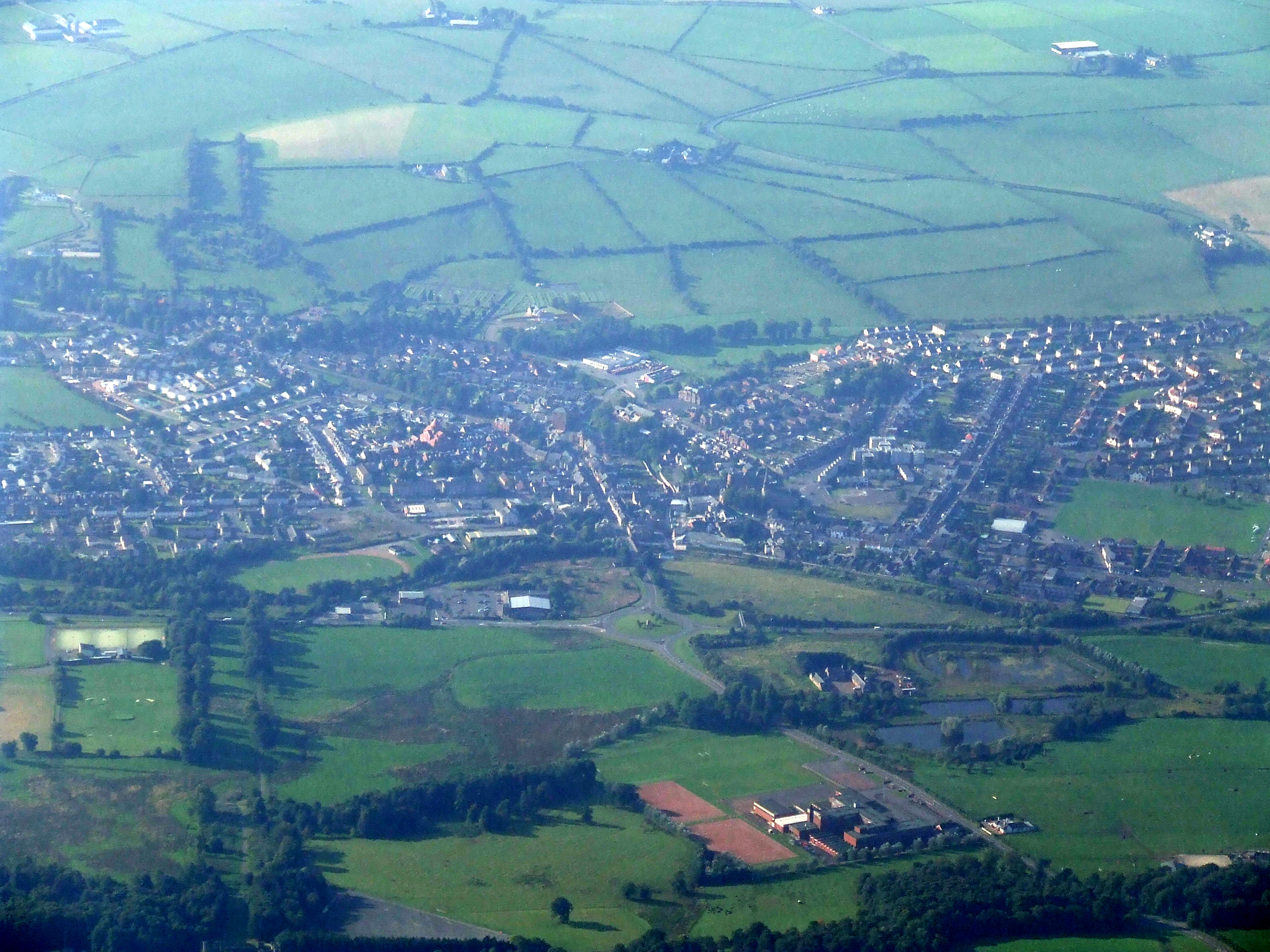
- Aerial view

- Location within East Ayrshire
- Population: 4,710 (2020)
- Language: English; Scots; Scottish Gaelic
- OS grid reference: NS569200
- Council area: East Ayrshire
- Lieutenancy area: Ayrshire and Arran
- Country: Scotland
- Sovereign state: United Kingdom
- Post town: Galston
- Postcode district: KA4
- Dialling code: 01563
- Police: Scotland
- Fire: Scottish
- Ambulance: Scottish
- UK Parliament: Kilmarnock and Loudoun
- Scottish Parliament: Kilmarnock and Irvine Valley

Galston (Lowland Scots: Gauston, Scottish Gaelic: Baile nan Gall) is a town in East Ayrshire, Scotland, which has a population of 4,710 (2022) and is at the heart of the civil parish of the same name.

It is situated in wooded countryside four miles (six kilometres) upriver from Kilmarnock and is one a group of the small towns located in the Irvine Valley between the towns of Hurlford and Newmilns. To the north of the town is the ruin of Loudoun Castle, the site of Loudoun Castle theme park from 1995 to 2010. In 1874 the population was 4,727.

== Etymology ==
The name Galston means "place of the strangers" from the Gaelic word Gall (a stranger), and the Toun or Ton was a farm and its outbuildings. The word baile was anglicised in more recent history as toun like many other place names in Scotland which were originally "bal".

== Religion and churches ==
- Galston Parish Church, designed by John Brash of Glasgow, built in 1809 on site of a pre-Reformation church. Spire 120 feet (37 metres) in height. Chancel added 1912 and 3-manual pipe organ by J J Binns 1913. The 17th-century Presbyterians forbade burials taking place within churches. In 1609 John Schaw of Sornbeg decided to bury his recently deceased wife within Galston Kirk. He entered the kirk with a party of armed men and proceeded to break up flagstones and dig a grave where he interred his wife's body. He was fined £20 for this action and promised never to attempt this act again.
- St Sophia's Church, 1885, Byzantine style church designed by architect Sir Robert Rowand Anderson, based on Hagia Sophia in Istanbul. Is a Category A Listed building.

== Areas of interest ==
=== The Burn Anne ===
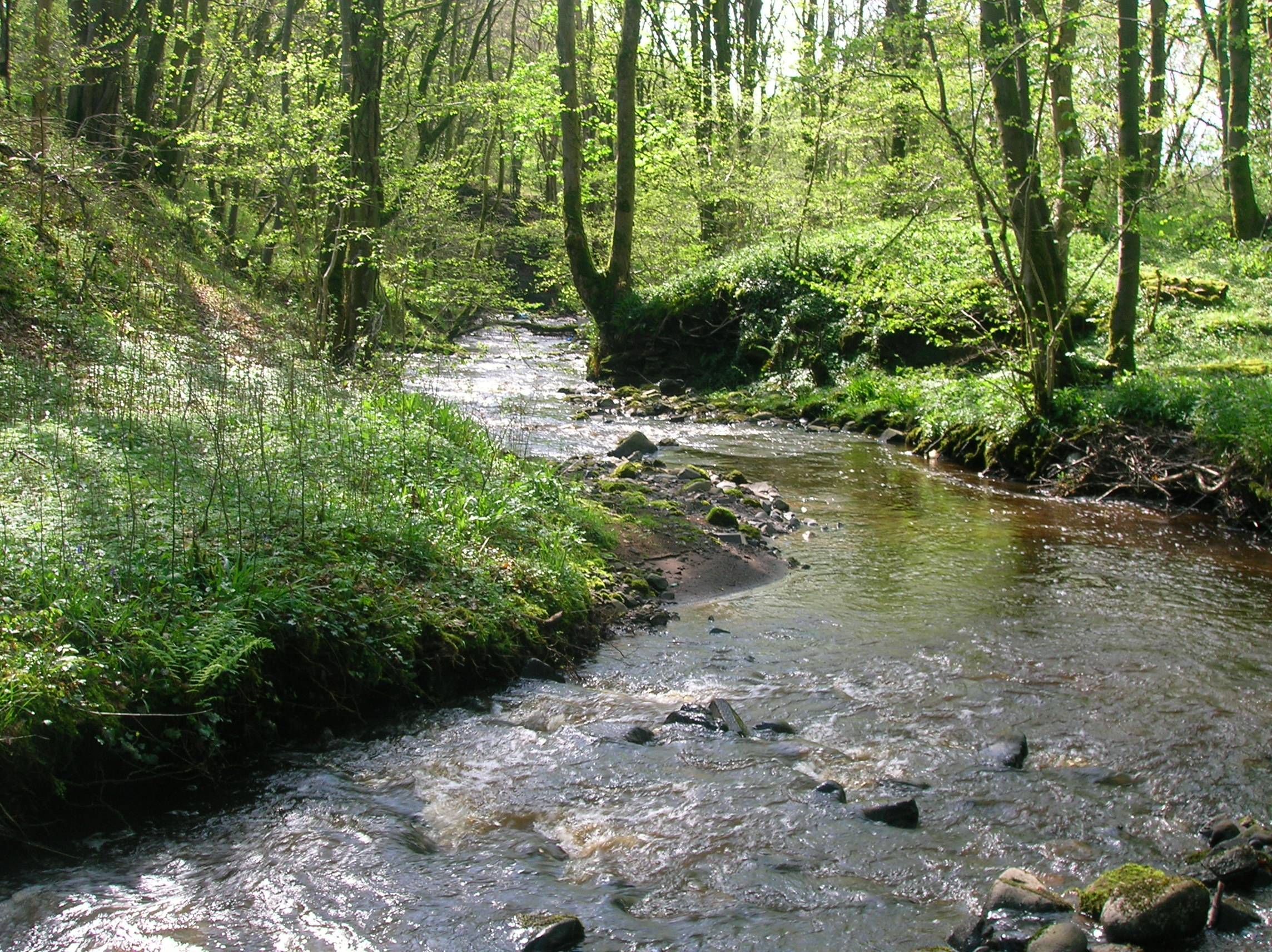
A view of the Burn Anne at Bank Wood Bridge.

The Burn Anne joins the Irvine at Galston. It is named after St Anne, said to be the mother of the Virgin Mary. "St Anne's Holy Well" is marked on the 1860 OS map and lies above Bank Wood, flowing into the Burn Anne. The Holy Well has been destroyed by the construction of a concrete tank which collects the spring water for Cessnock Castle, first constructed for the Duke of Portland in Victorian times. The Carsewell Hole nearby was used for adult baptism.

The woodlands here have a high plant biodiversity value and are a registered provisional wildlife site as designated by the Scottish Wildlife Trust. Species noted in 2007 include woodruff, bird cherry, primrose, common violet, oak, stitchwort, golden male (scaly) fern, bugle, opposite-leaved golden saxifrage, bluebell, dog's mercury, broad buckler fern, watercress, lady fern, male shield fern, kidney vetch, woodrush, woodsedge, blackthorn, hawthorn, marsh marigold, foxglove, sweet cicely, herb robert, red campion, bistort, ribwort plantain, water avens, wood avens, moschatel, elm, alder, and many liverworts. A pair of buzzards were noted.

A great danger is the presence of the alien invader, the pink purslane or Stewarton flower, which will spread rapidly and destroy the native herbs by out-competing them (2007). It needs to be removed as matter of urgency.

A new (2008) metalled path has been created through part of these woods, greatly improving access. A new wood has been planted along part of the new path and this will in time extend and protect the habitats and the biodiversity of the site.

This tributary of the Irvine was famous for its rich jasper pebbles; semi-precious stones which were collected, cut and polished for use in jewellery.

=== The Barr Castle ===
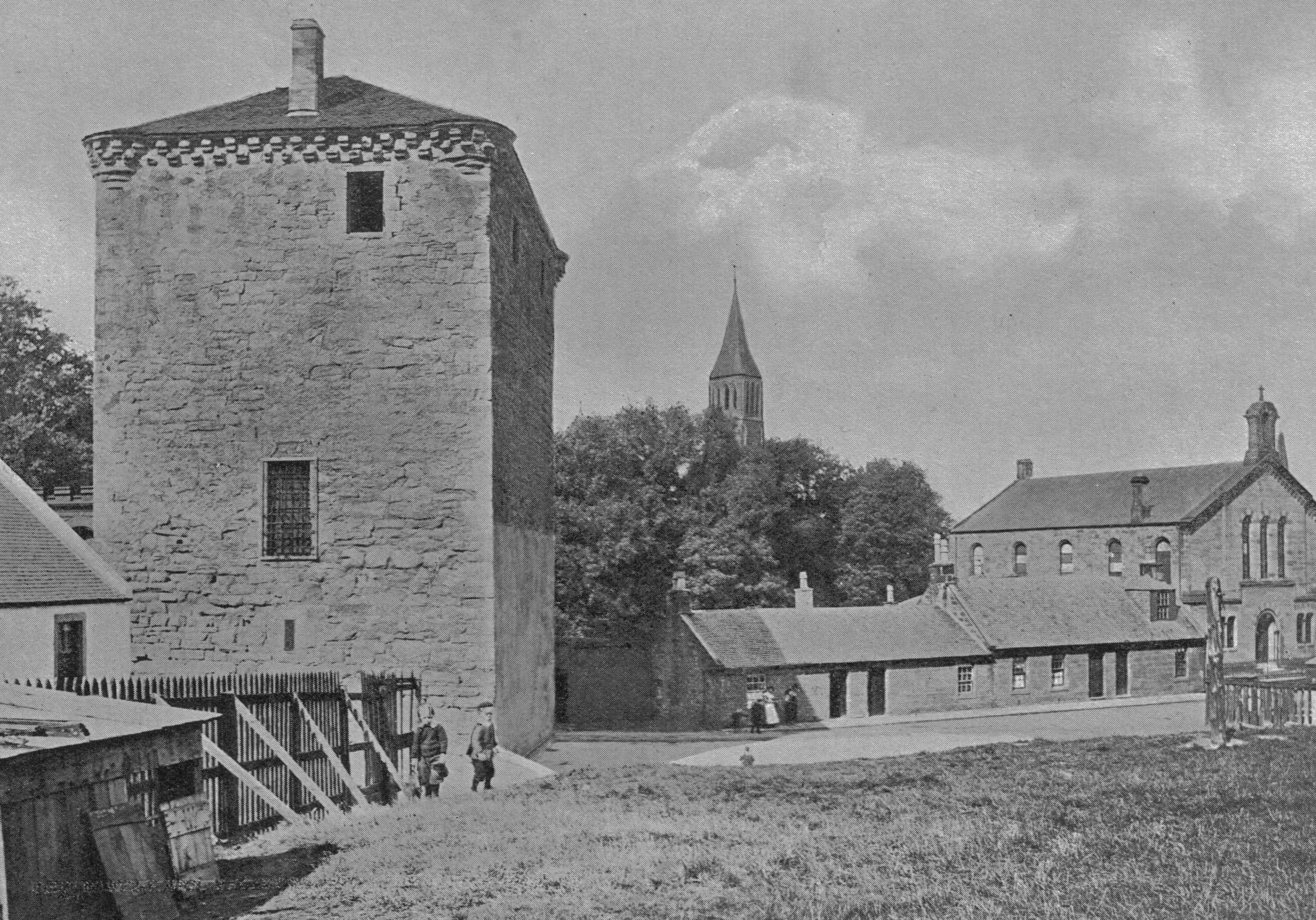
The Barr Castle in 1900.

Probably dating from the 15th century, this five-storeyed red sandstone tower castle still stands as a prominent feature (NS 505 360) on a rocky knoll close to the Burn Anne, within the town's boundaries. It was also known as Lockhart's Tower and was built to control the nearby access points up the Irvine Valley.

William Wallace is said to have taken refuge from pursuing English soldiers within the tower, eventually escaping siege by climbing down an overhanging tree.

It has a practical, if not authentic, roof which does not hide a view of the continuous corbelling of the parapet. The bottom section of the four angle towers are discernible.

The castle was built for the Lockhart family who held the Barony of Galston; enthusiastic opponents of the Catholic faith. In 1670 the property was purchased by the Campbells of Cessnock Castle nearby. In 2019 celebrations will be held to mark the 125th anniversary of the castle being used as a Masonic Lodge by Lodge St. Peter 331. It also houses a museum of local artefacts. The castle is open to the public on occasions and has proved a very popular venue for weddings. In August 1528, James Campbell of Lochlee abducted Alexander Pawtoun from Mauchline and imprisoned him for 5 days in the dungeon ('spelunca') of the Tower of Galston in order to extort the sum of £20. In an old charter of 12 March 1438, John Lockhart, Lord of Barr, provides for an annual rent to be paid to the chaplain for saying three masses annually for the repose of his soul at the altar of the church of Saint Peter in Ardrossan.

The renowned reformer and Protestant martyr George Wishart preached at the castle in 1545 and in 1556 John Knox also preached here; both were under the protection of John Lockart of Barr and his fellow reformers.

=== The Judge's Hill ===
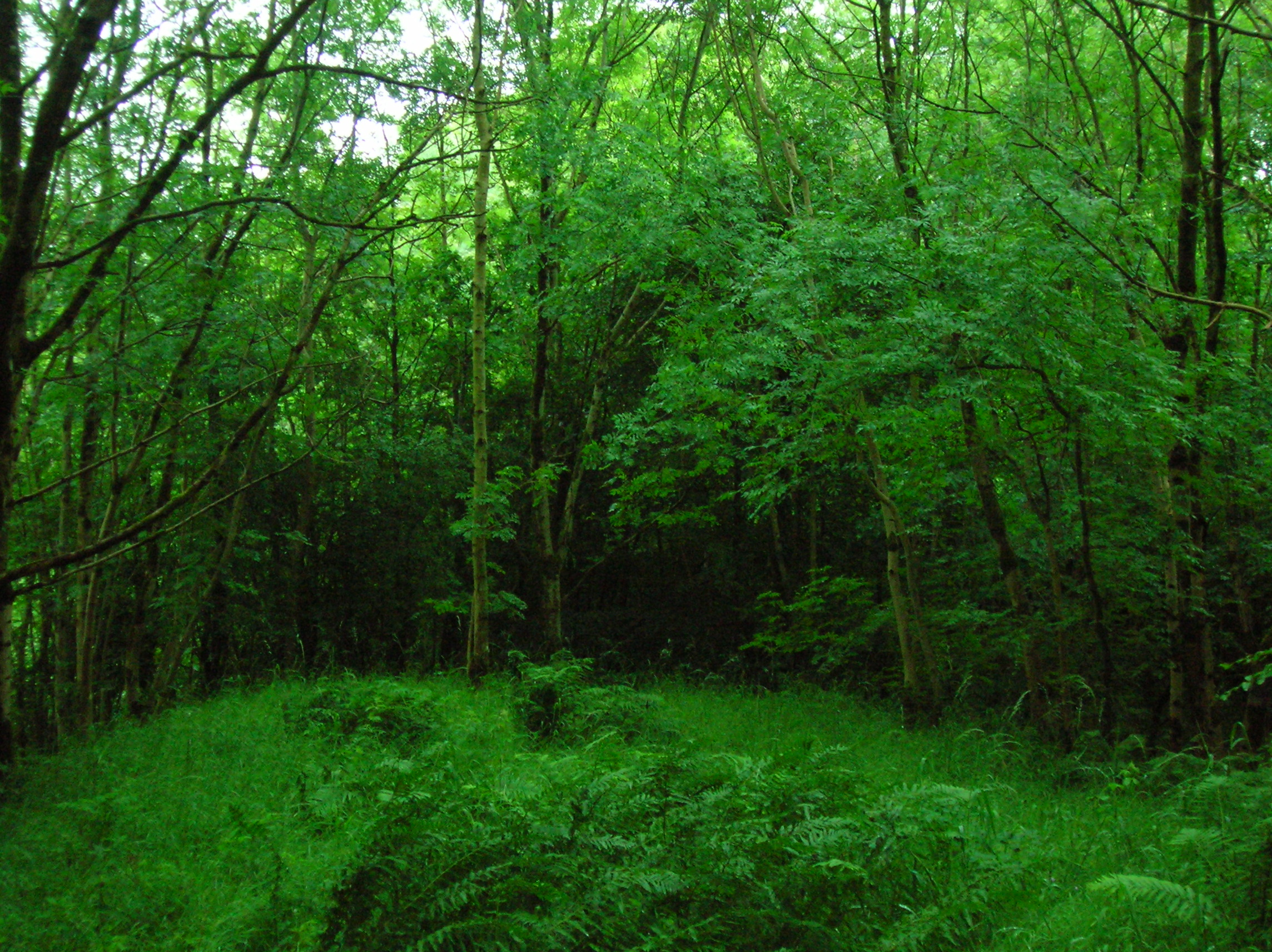
The Judge's Hill near Galston, just visible through the woods.

A justice hill survives in a patch of woodland on the Hag Burn near the Loudoun Country Club. This site may have been linked to the old Barony of Galston and the feudal rights of the Campbells of Loudoun.

The site has a nearby lime kiln and old ruins next to the Hag Burn which may have been a forge.

== Galston railway station ==
This station on the Glasgow and South Western Railway line to Stonehouse via Strathaven, closed in 1964.

== Culture ==
=== The Galston Handball Game ===
This game was popular with farm workers who used clenched hands to hit a hard ball off the side wall of the Barr Castle – similar to Gaelic handball and fives, or rather like squash without the use of rackets or a soft, squashy ball. The court was of earth, beaten hard. Galston became World Champions at this handball sport, however it is no longer played, the last official game being in 1939. Local legend has it that the game was used by William Wallace to help keep his men fit for battle.

Handball was popular in these parts during the 19th century and Galston was the site of the most important competition, held on the Saturday of the Glasgow Fair. It belonged to the group of sports that Gaelic handball still represents. John Galt refers to handball being played in Irvine against the back wall of a malt-kiln.

== Notable residents ==
- Alison Begbie (possibly Elizabeth Gebbie, 1762–1863), friend of poet Robert Burns
- Rev Dr Robert Stirling (1790–1878), inventor of the Stirling engine was minister of Galston Parish Church
- Lady Flora Hastings (11 February 1806 – 5 July 1839) of Loudon Castle was a lady-in-waiting to Queen Victoria's mother, the Duchess of Kent. Her death in 1839 was the subject of a court scandal that gave the Queen a negative image. Buried in Loudoun Kirk
- James Howie (1878–1963), footballer with Kilmarnock, Huddersfield Town, Newcastle United, and Scotland
- Andy Cunningham (1891–1973), footballer with Kilmarnock, Rangers and Scotland
- James Leslie (1908–1980), footballer with Kilmarnock
- Rev Prof Hugh Anderson (1920–2003), theologian

== See also ==
- Darvel
- Galston F.C.
- Loudoun Academy, Galston
- River Irvine
