= Globe Museum =

Museum in Vienna, Austria

- Globenmuseum
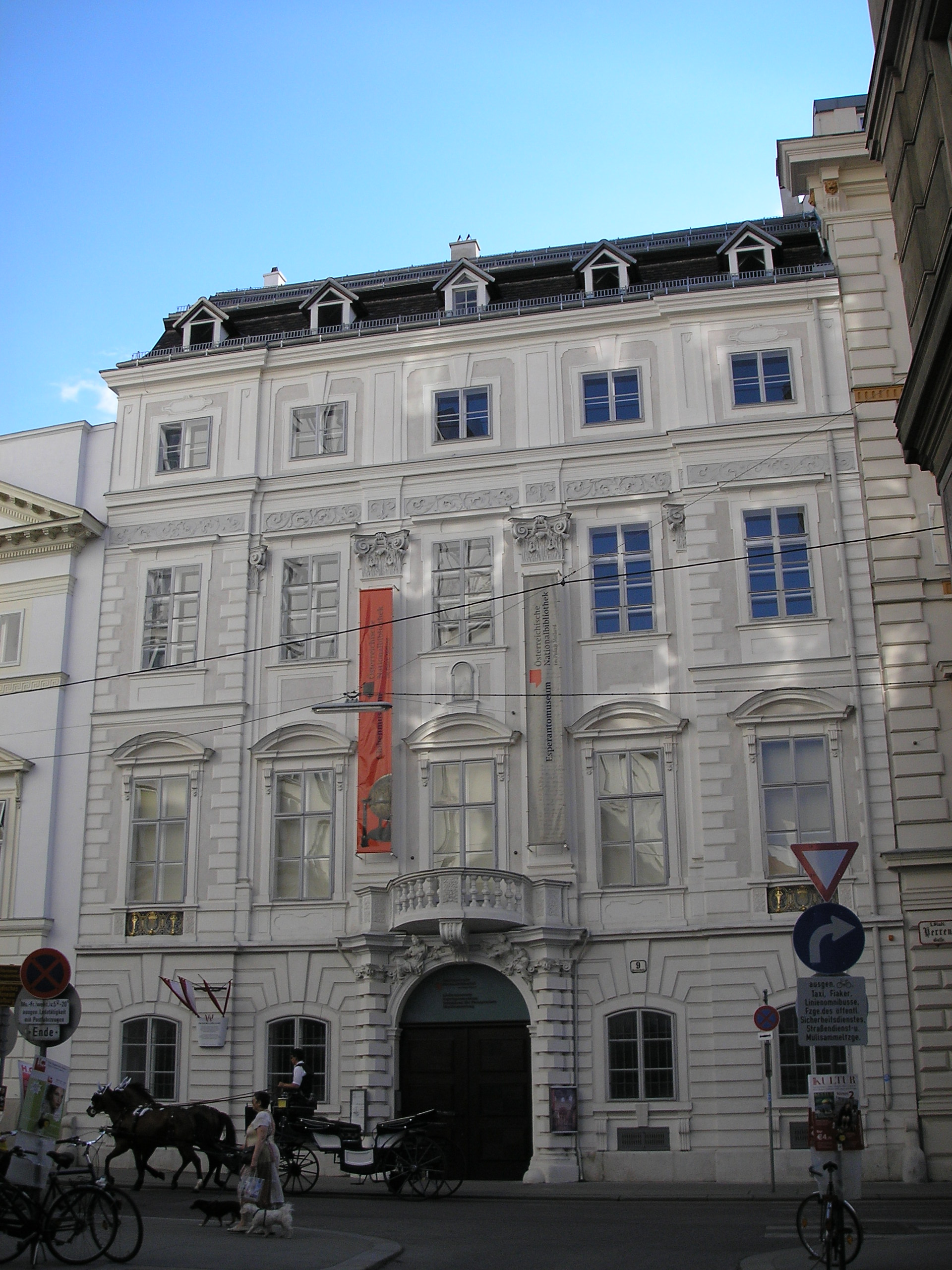
- Palais Mollard, home of the Globe Museum.
- Established: 1956
- Location: Herrengasse 9; 1010 Wien; Austria
- Coordinates: 48°12′33.5″N 16°21′25″E
- Type: Globe collection
- Collection size: 600
- Website: Globe Museum (in English)

The Globe Museum (German: Globenmuseum) is a museum in the Palais Mollard, Vienna, Austria, part of the Austrian National Library. It was opened in 1956, and is the only public museum in the world devoted to globes, being three-dimensional models of Earth or other celestial bodies, or spherical representations of the celestial sphere.

== History ==
As early as the 19th century, there was a globe collection within the Vienna Imperial Library, the forerunner to the Austrian National Library. The globes in this collection were acquired either as purchases or as gifts (for example, Vincenzo Coronelli created two globes especially for Leopold I, Holy Roman Emperor from 1658 to 1705, with each globe having an engraved portrait of the Emperor and an inscription).

In 1921, the geographer, Eugen Oberhummer, conducted an inventory of the collection and found eight globes of various sizes (both terrestrial and celestial), and two armillary spheres. In 1922, these globes were transferred to the National Library's map collection where, by 1948, there were already 28 globes. In the annual report of the director of the collection in 1948, it was noted that the globes were among the collection's most rarely used items.

In 1956, the National Library opened the Globe Museum with a total of 63 exhibits. Its foundation collection was a combination of the imperial collection and the collections of the International Coronelli Society for the Study of Globes, and the cartographer Robert Haardt, who had been instrumental in the museum's establishment.

The museum was originally housed in the Augustinian tract of the Hofburg in Josefsplatz, Vienna, as part of the National Library's map collection. In 1970 and 1986, the museum was allocated new rooms within the same tract.

During the museum's first 30 years, its collection grew to 145 items by purchase, gift and exchange with other museums. By 1996, the museum had 260 exhibits. Since the end of 2005 the museum has been accommodated at the Palais Mollard in the Herrengasse.

== Collection ==
There are now approximately 600 terrestrial and celestial globes in the collection, and around 200 of them are constantly on display. The majority of them date from before 1850.

The oldest item in the collection is the terrestrial globe of Gemma Frisius (circa 1536). Highlights are the globes of Vincenzo Coronelli (110 cm (43 in) diameter) and a pair of globes by Gerard Mercator from 1541 and 1551. Further objects in the collection include armillary spheres, planetary globes, astronomical instruments, and instruments in which a globe represents a component, such as planet machines (orreries), tellurions and lunariums.

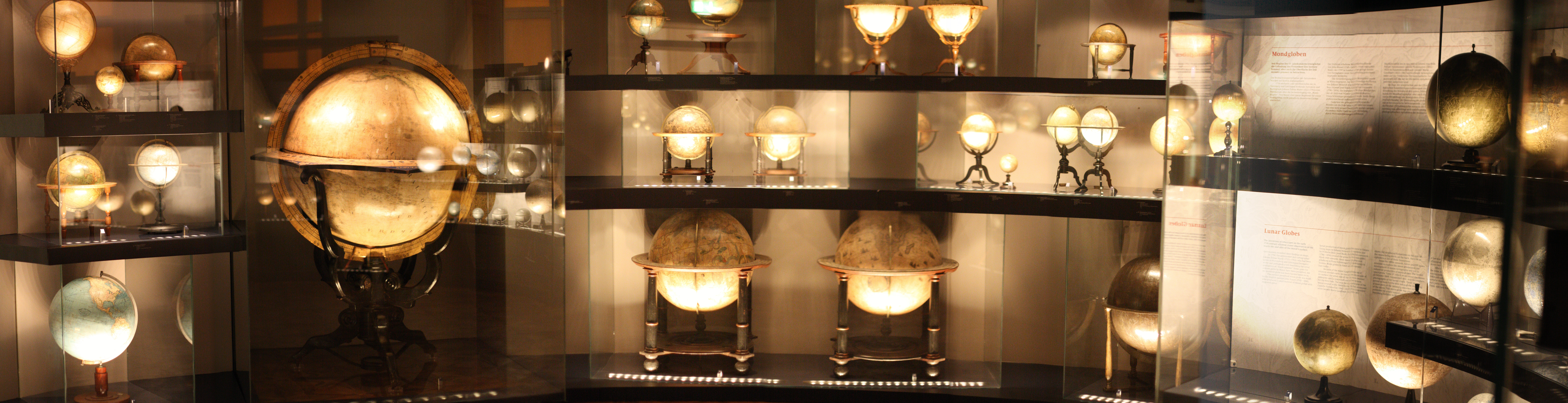
Panorama

== Sources ==
- Mokre, Jan; Allmayer-Beck, Peter E (publisher) (2005). The Globe Museum of the Austrian National Library. Wien: Bibliophile Edition. OCLC 500454860.
