= Orrery =

Mechanical model of the Solar System

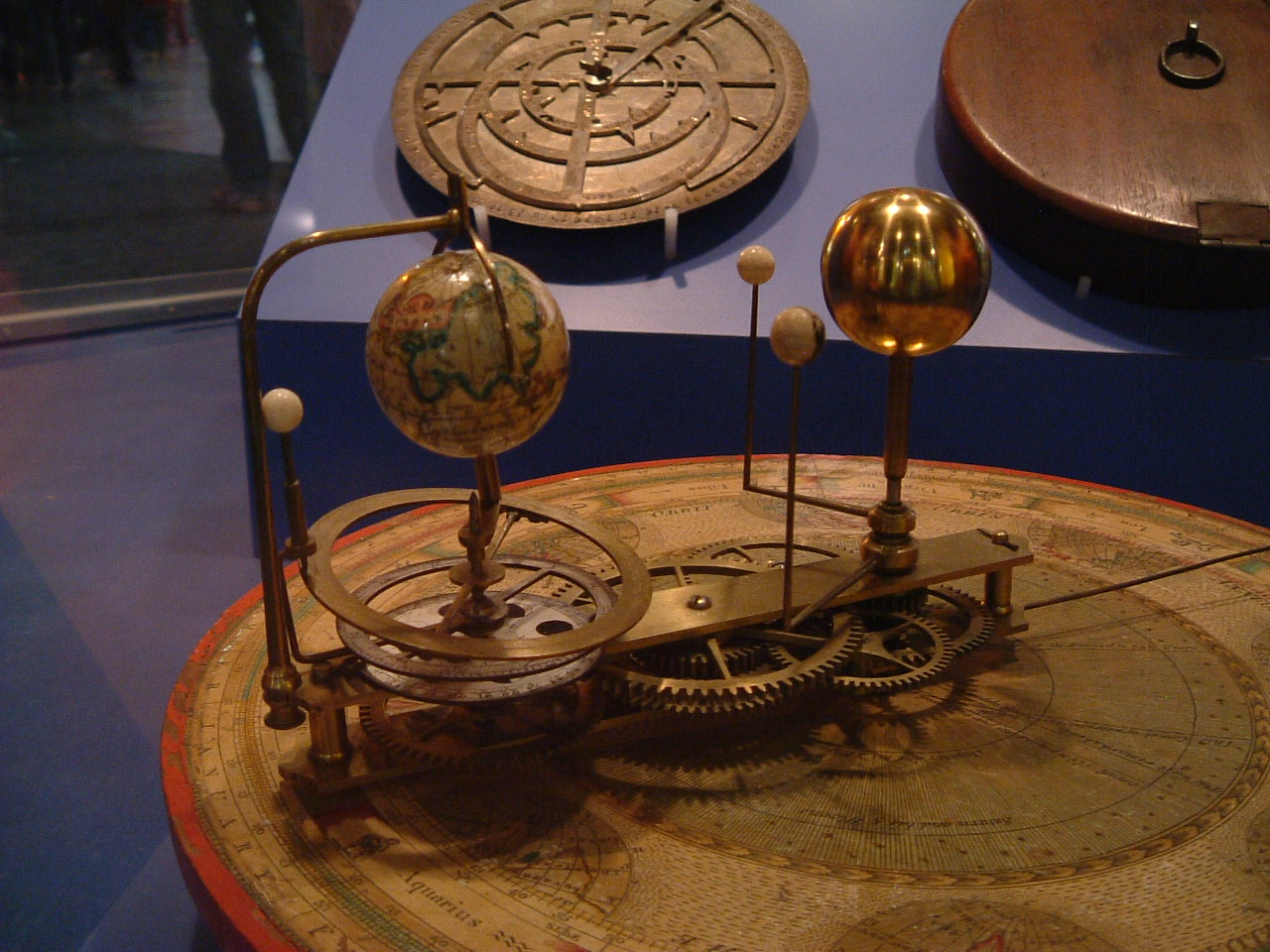
A small orrery showing Earth and the inner planets

An orrery (/ˈɒr.ə.ri/) is a mechanical model of the Solar System that illustrates or predicts the relative positions and motions of the planets and moons, usually according to the heliocentric model. It may also represent the relative sizes of these bodies; however, since accurate scaling is often not practical due to the actual large ratio differences, it may use a scaled-down approximation. Mechanical planetary models are known to have existed since the Ancient Greeks, and are known by various names, but the term orrery is derived from a device produced c. 1712 by John Rowley and named for his patron Charles Boyle, 4th Earl of Orrery.

Orreries are typically driven by a clockwork mechanism with a globe representing the Sun at the centre, and with a planet at the end of each of a series of arms.

== History ==
=== Ancient ===
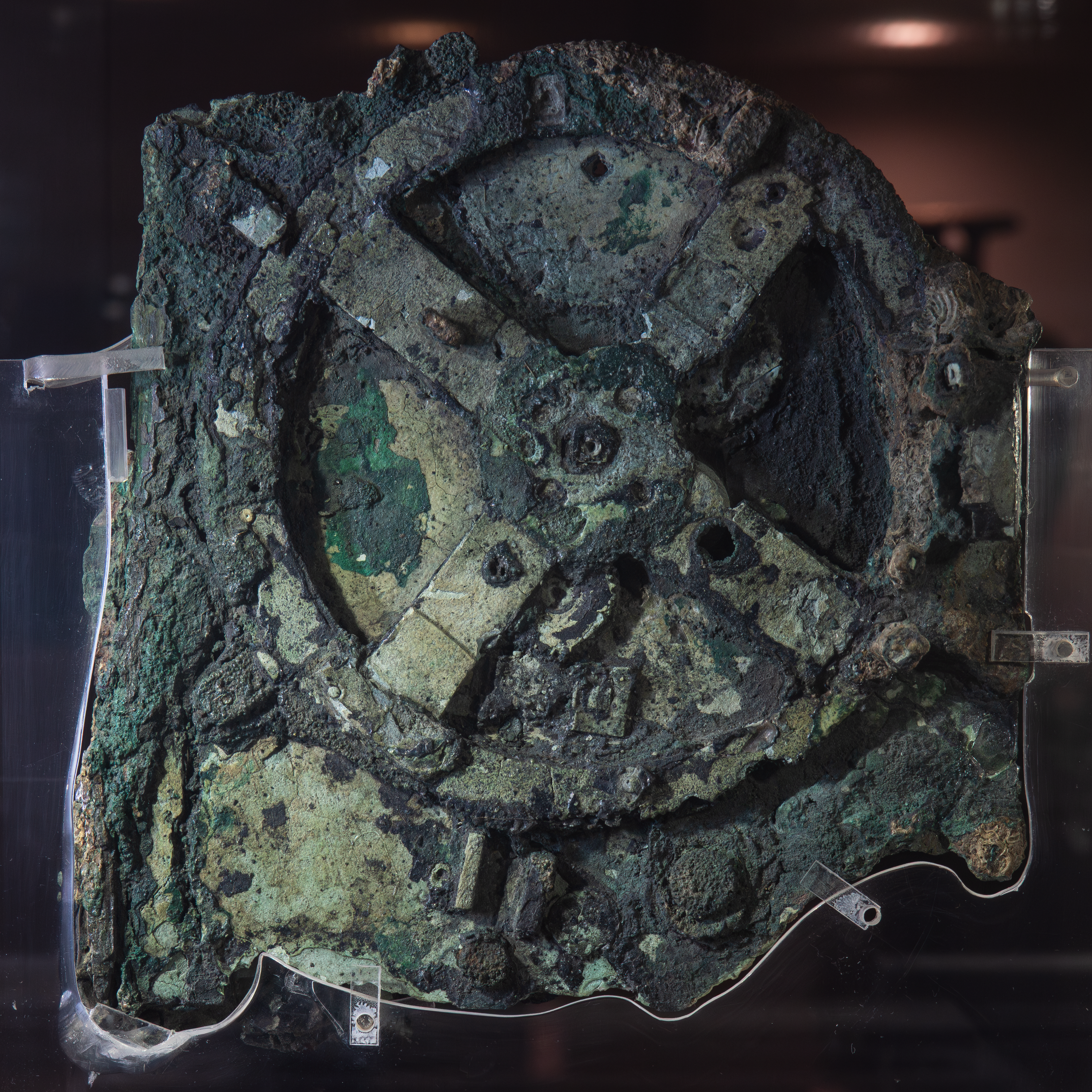
Antikythera mechanism, main fragment, c. 205 to 87 BC

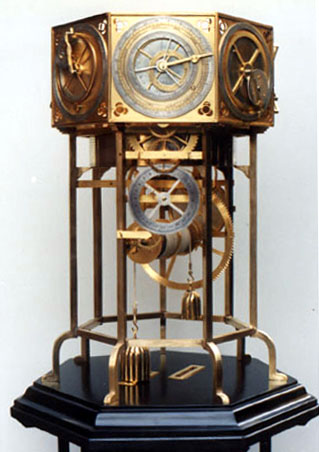
Carlo G Croce, reconstruction of Dondi's Astrarium, originally built between 1348 and 1364 in Padua

Discovered in 1901 in a shipwreck off the Greek island of Antikythera in the Mediterranean Sea, the Antikythera mechanism has been reconstructed as exhibiting the diurnal motions of the Sun, Moon, and the five planets known to the ancient Greeks. The geocentric mechanism has been dated between 205 and 87 BC and is considered one of the first orreries, likely used as a mechanical calculator to calculate astronomical positions.

Cicero, the Roman philosopher and politician writing in the first century BC, made reference to planetary mechanical models in his writings. According to Cicero, the Greek polymaths Thales and Posidonius each constructed a device modelling the motion of celestial bodies.

=== Medieval ===
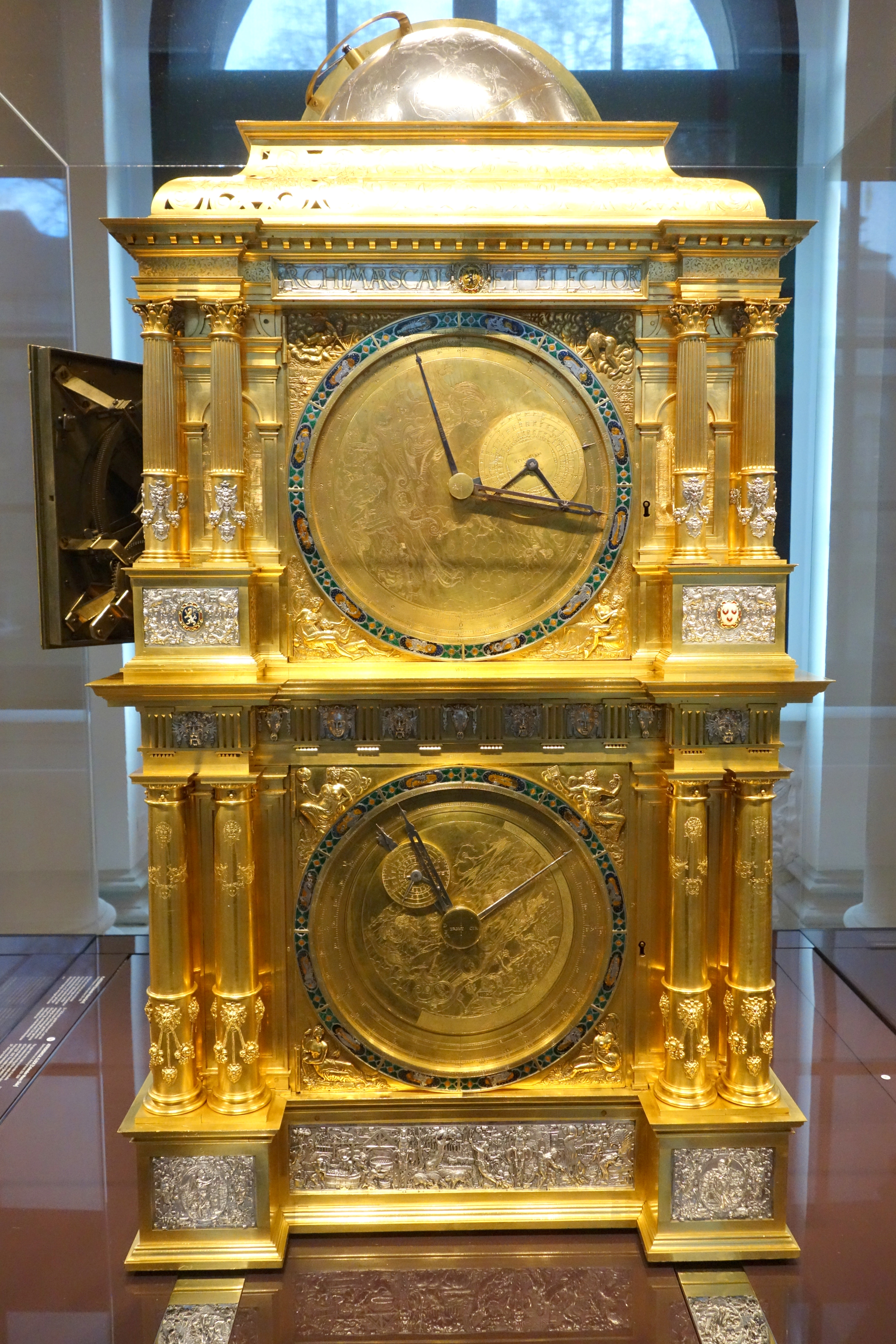
Astronomical clock (Venus-Mercury side) by Eberhard Baldewein, 1563–1568. Exhibit in the Mathematisch-Physikalischer Salon of Dresden, Germany.

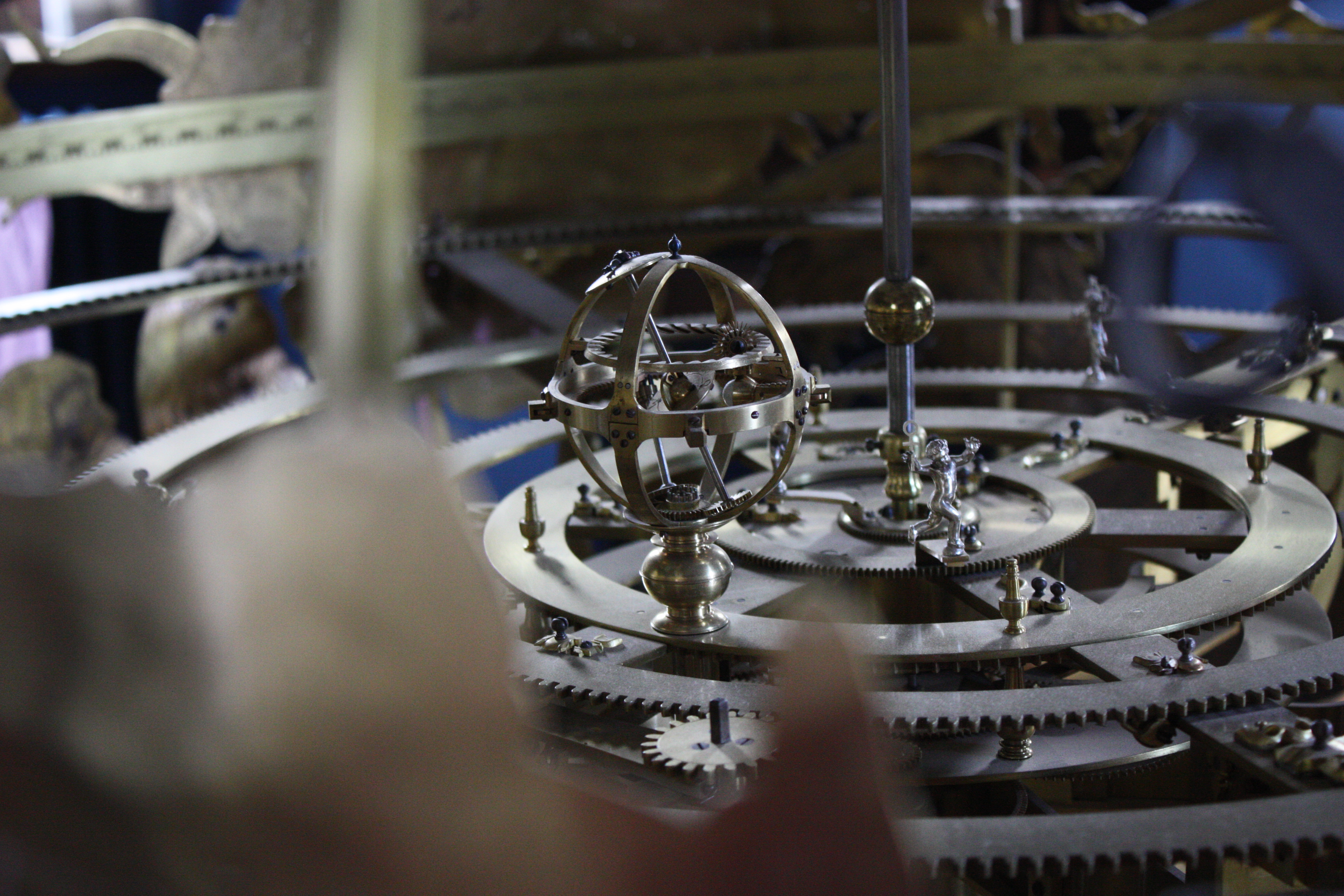
The Orrery inside the Sphaera Copernicana, designed by Joseph of Gottorp and built by Andreas Bösch, 1653

In 1348, Giovanni Dondi built the first known clock driven mechanism of the system. It displays the ecliptic position of the Moon, Sun, Mercury, Venus, Mars, Jupiter and Saturn according to the complicated geocentric Ptolemaic planetary theories. The clock itself is lost, but Dondi left a complete description of its astronomic gear trains.

=== Early Modern ===
At the court of William IV, Landgrave of Hesse-Kassel two complicated astronomic clocks were built in 1561 and 1563–1568. These use four sides to show the ecliptical positions of the Sun, Mercury, Venus, Mars, Jupiter, Saturn, the Moon, Sun and Dragon (Nodes of the Moon) according to Ptolemy, a calendar, the sunrise and sunset, and an automated celestial sphere with an animated Sun symbol which, for the first time on a celestial globe, shows the real position of the Sun, including the equation of time. The clocks are now on display in Kassel at the Astronomisch-Physikalisches Kabinett and in Dresden at the Mathematisch-Physikalischer Salon.

In De revolutionibus orbium coelestium, published in Nuremberg in 1543, Nicolaus Copernicus challenged the Western teaching of a geocentric universe in which the Sun revolved daily around the Earth. He observed that some Greek philosophers such as Aristarchus of Samos had proposed a heliocentric universe. This simplified the apparent epicyclic motions of the planets, making it feasible to represent the planets' paths as simple circles. This could be modeled by the use of gears. Tycho Brahe's improved instruments made precise observations of the skies (1576–1601), and from these Johannes Kepler (1621) deduced that planets orbited the Sun in ellipses. In 1687 Isaac Newton explained the cause of elliptic motion in his theory of gravitation.

As late as 1650, P. Schirleus built a geocentric planetarium with the Sun as a planet, and with Mercury and Venus revolving around the Sun as its moons.

==== The eponymous orrery ====
There is an orrery built by clock makers George Graham and Thomas Tompion dated c. 1710 in the History of Science Museum, Oxford. Graham gave the first model, or its design, to the celebrated instrument maker John Rowley of London to make a copy for Prince Eugene of Savoy. Rowley was commissioned to make another copy for his patron Charles Boyle, 4th Earl of Orrery (in County Cork, Ireland), from which the device took its name in English. The name orrery may be a pun on the term horary, a term related to timekeeping. It was produced c. 1712 by John Rowley. The plaque on it reads:

Orrery invented by Graham 1700
Improved by Rowley, and presented by him to John [sic] (Note: John Boyle was Charles Boyle's son, and succeeded him as Earl of Orrery.) Earl of Orrery, after whom it was named at the suggestion of Richard Steele.

The attribution of the naming to Richard Steele is spurious, as Steele himself attributes the naming to Rowley in his 1713 article popularizing the orrery. This oft-repeated attribution error ultimately derives from a minor error in the writings of the lecturer John T. Desaguliers.

The device is a tellurion.

==== Other orreries ====
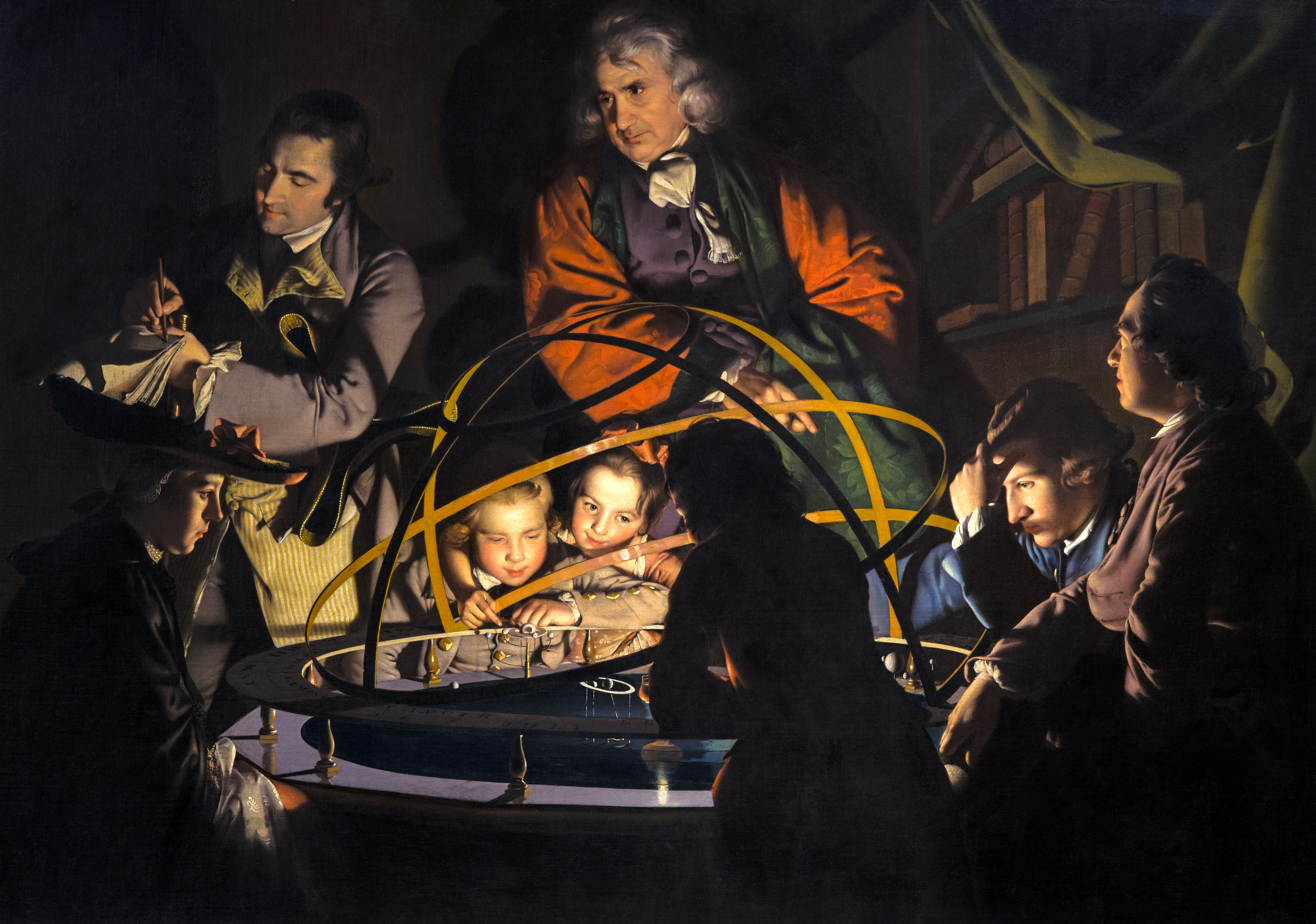
A Philosopher Lecturing on the Orrery (c. 1766) by Joseph Wright of Derby

Modern working reconstruction of a grand orrery at Derby Museum and Art Gallery (England)

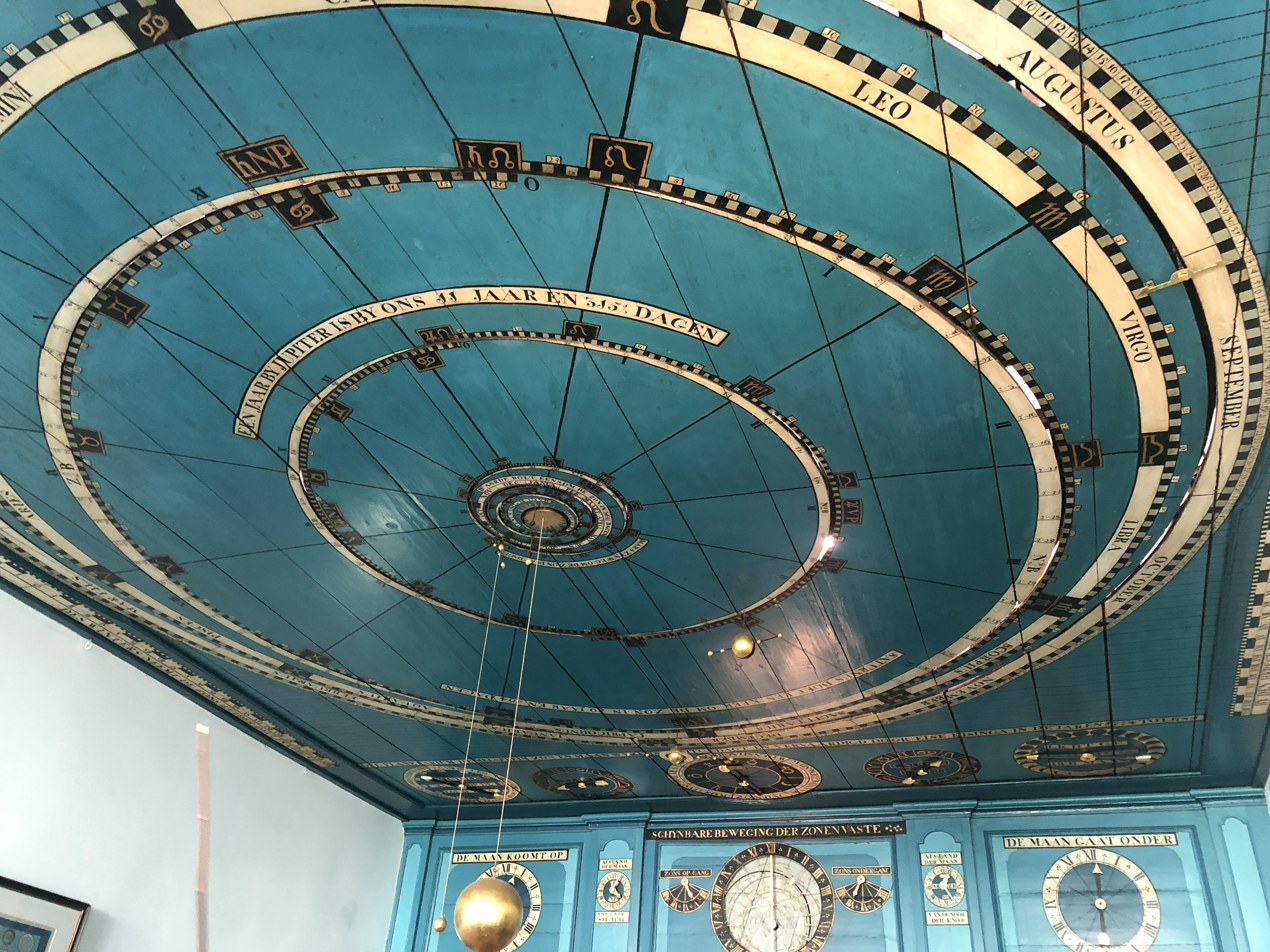
The orrery built by wool carder Eise Eisinga from 1774 to 1781 in his living room, the oldest functioning planetarium in the world

Independently, Christiaan Huygens published in 1703 details of a heliocentric planetary machine which he had built while living in Paris between 1665 and 1681. He calculated the gear trains needed to represent a year of 365.242 days, and used that to produce the cycles of the principal planets.

Joseph Wright's painting A Philosopher giving a Lecture on the Orrery (c. 1766), which hangs in the Derby Museum and Art Gallery, depicts a group listening to a lecture by a natural philosopher. The Sun in a brass orrery provides the only light in the room. The orrery depicted in the painting has rings, which give it an appearance similar to that of an armillary sphere. The demonstration was thereby able to depict eclipses.

To put this in chronological context, in 1762 John Harrison's marine chronometer first enabled accurate measurement of longitude. In 1766, astronomer Johann Daniel Titius first demonstrated that the mean distance of each planet from the Sun could be represented by the following progression:

$\frac{4+0}{10},\frac{4+3}{10},\frac{4+6}{10},\frac{4+12}{10},\frac{4+24}{10},...$

That is, 0.4, 0.7, 1.0, 1.6, 2.8, ... The numbers refer to astronomical units, the mean distance between Sun and Earth, which is 1.496 × 10^{8} km (93 × 10^{6} miles). The Derby Orrery does not show mean distance, but demonstrated the relative planetary movements.

The Eisinga Planetarium was built from 1774 to 1781 by Eise Eisinga in his home in Franeker, in the Netherlands. It displays the planets across the width of a room's ceiling, and has been in operation almost continually since it was created. This orrery is a planetarium in both senses of the word: a complex machine showing planetary orbits, and a theatre for depicting the planets' movement. Eisinga house was bought by the Dutch Royal family who gave him a pension.

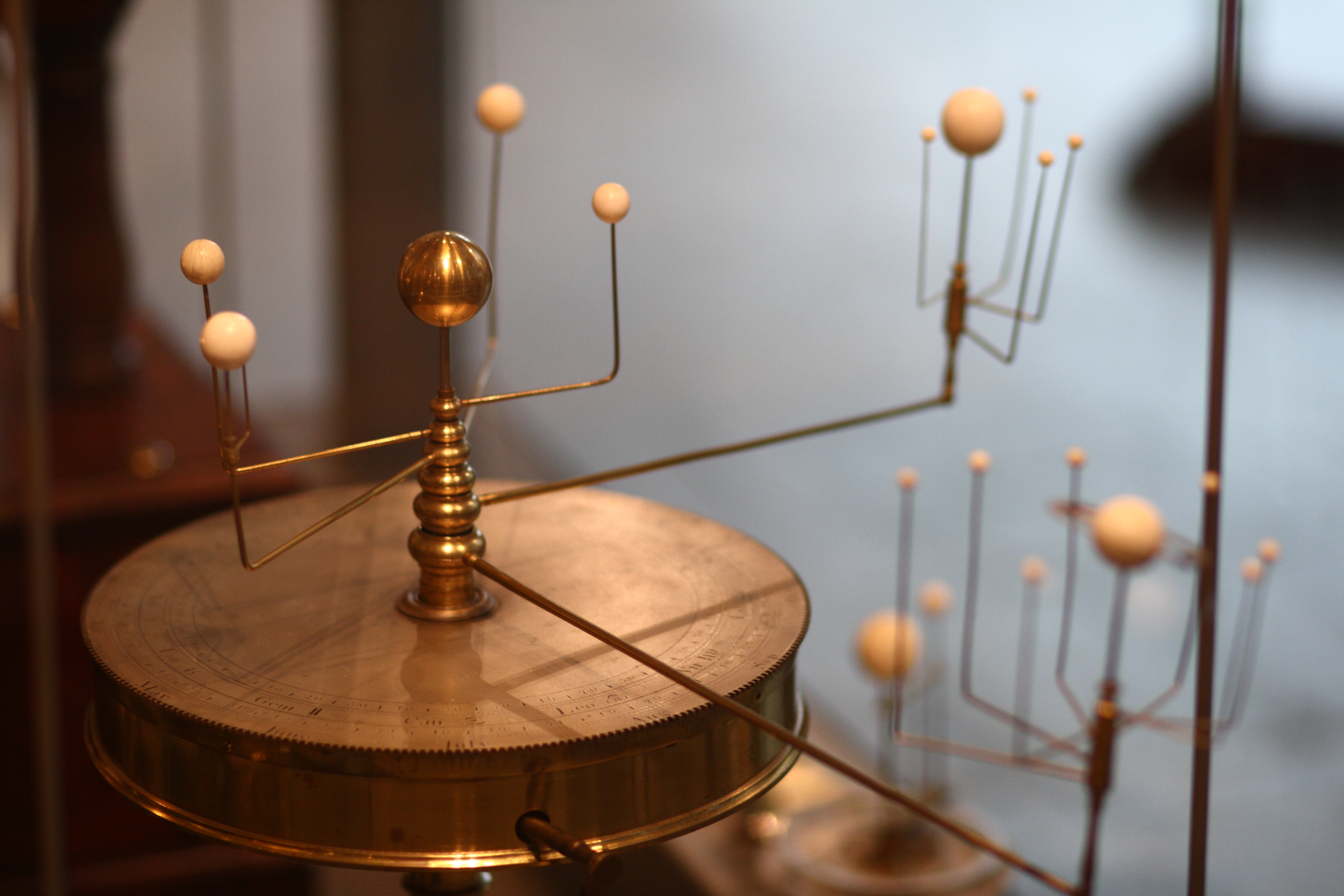
A 1766 Benjamin Martin Orrery, used at Harvard

In 1764, Benjamin Martin devised a new type of planetary model, in which the planets were carried on brass arms leading from a series of concentric or coaxial tubes. With this construction it was difficult to make the planets revolve, and to get the moons to turn around the planets. Martin suggested that the conventional orrery should consist of three parts: the planetarium where the planets revolved around the Sun, the tellurion (also tellurian or tellurium) which showed the inclined axis of the Earth and how it revolved around the Sun, and the lunarium which showed the eccentric rotations of the Moon around the Earth. In one orrery, these three motions could be mounted on a common table, separately using the central spindle as a prime mover.

== Workings ==
All orreries are planetariums, in the sense of planetary mechanical models. (That sense of planetarium was the common one historically. The word planetarium has shifted meaning, and now usually refers to hemispherical theatres in which images of the night sky are projected onto an overhead surface.) The term orrery has only existed since 1714. A grand orrery is one that includes the outer planets known at the time of its construction. Orreries can range widely in size from hand-held to room-sized. An orrery is used to demonstrate the motion of the planets, while a mechanical device used to predict eclipses and transits is called an astrarium.

An orrery should properly include the Sun, the Earth and the Moon (plus optionally other planets). A model that only includes the Earth, the Moon, and the Sun is called a tellurion or tellurium, and one which only includes the Earth and the Moon is a lunarium. A jovilabe is a model of Jupiter and its moons.

Key statistics of planets
Planet	Average distance from Sun (AU)	Diameter (in Earth diameters)	Mass (in Earth masses)	Density (g/cm^{3})	No. of known moons	Orbital period (Earth years)	Inclination to ecliptic (degrees)	Axial tilt (degrees)	Rotational period (sidereal)
Mercury	0.39	0.38	0.05	5.5	0	0.24	7.0°	0°	59 days
Venus	0.72	0.95	0.82	5.3	0	0.62	3.4°	177°	–243 days (Note: A negative figure indicates retrograde rotation.)
Earth	1.00	1.00	1.00	5.5	1	1.00	0°	23°	23.9 hours
Mars	1.52	0.53	0.11	3.9	2	1.88	1.9°	25°	24.5 hours
Jupiter	5.20	11.21	317.9	1.3	115	11.9	1.3°	3°	10 hours
Saturn	9.54	9.45	95.2	0.7	292	29.5	2.5°	27°	11 hours
Uranus	19.2	4.01	14.5	1.3	29	84	0.8°	98°	−17 hours
Neptune	30.1	3.88	17.1	1.6	16	165	1.8°	28°	16 hours

A planetarium will show the orbital period of each planet and the rotation rate, as shown in the table above. A tellurion will show the Earth with the Moon revolving around the Sun. It will use the angle of inclination of the equator from the table above to show how it rotates around its own axis. It will show the Earth's Moon, rotating around the Earth. A lunarium is designed to show the complex motions of the Moon as it revolves around the Earth.

Orreries are usually not built to scale. Human orreries, where humans move about as the planets, have also been constructed, but most are temporary. There is a permanent human orrery at Armagh Observatory in Northern Ireland, which has the six ancient planets, Ceres, and comets Halley and Encke. Uranus and beyond are also shown, but in a fairly limited way. Another is at Sky's the Limit Observatory and Nature Center in Twentynine Palms, California; it is a true to scale (20 billion to one), true to position (accurate to within four days) human orrery. The first four planets are relatively close to one another, but the next four require a certain amount of hiking in order to visit them. A census of all permanent human orreries has been initiated by the French group F-HOU with a new effort to study their impact for education in schools. A map of known human orreries is available.

A normal mechanical clock could be used to produce an extremely simple orrery to demonstrate the principle, with the Sun in the centre, Earth on the minute hand and Jupiter on the hour hand; Earth would make 12 revolutions around the Sun for every 1 revolution of Jupiter. As Jupiter's actual year is 11.86 Earth years long, the model would lose accuracy rapidly.

=== Projection ===
Many planetariums have a projection orrery, which projects onto the dome of the planetarium a Sun with either dots or small images of the planets. These usually are limited to the planets from Mercury to Saturn, although some include Uranus. The light sources for the planets are projected onto mirrors which are geared to a motor which drives the images on the dome. Typically the Earth will circle the Sun in one minute, while the other planets will complete an orbit in time periods proportional to their actual motion. Thus Venus, which takes 224.7 days to orbit the Sun, will take 37 seconds to complete an orbit on an orrery, and Jupiter will take 11 minutes, 52 seconds.

Some planetariums have taken advantage of this to use orreries to simulate planets and their moons. Thus Mercury orbits the Sun in 0.24 of an Earth year, while Phobos and Deimos orbit Mars in a similar 4:1 time ratio. Planetarium operators wishing to show this have placed a red cap on the Sun (to make it resemble Mars) and turned off all the planets but Mercury and Earth. Similar approximations can be used to show Pluto and its five moons.

== Notable examples ==
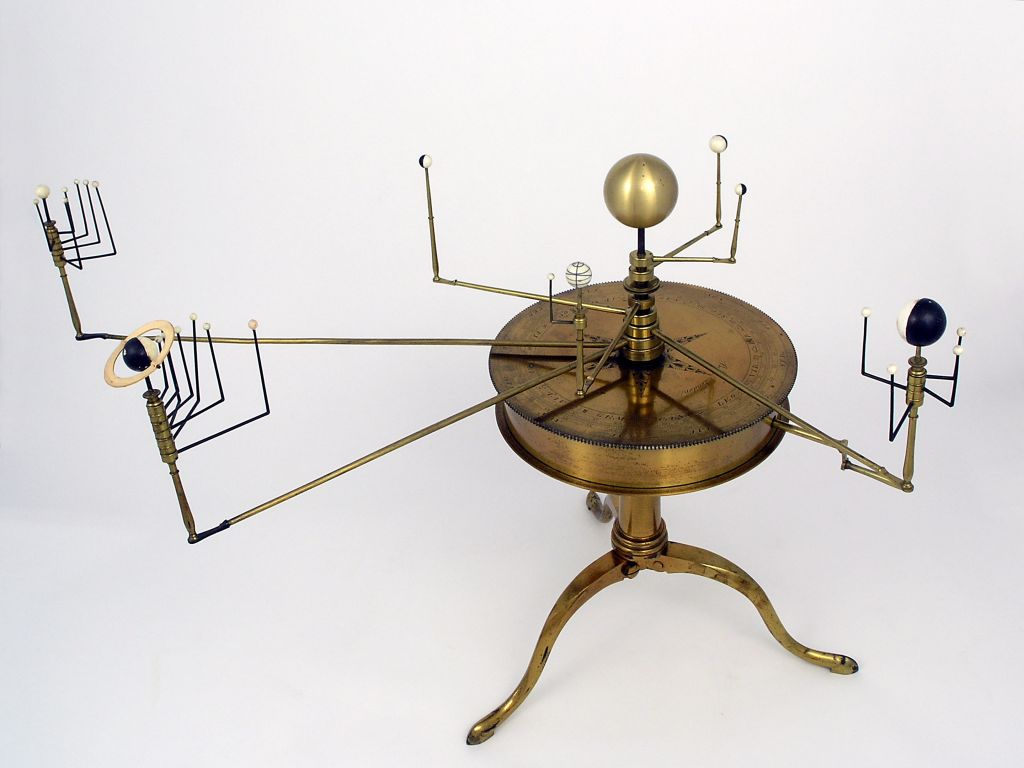
An orrery made by Robert Brettell Bate, c. 1812. Now in Thinktank, Birmingham Science Museum.

Shoemaker John Fulton of Fenwick, Ayrshire, built three between 1823 and 1833. The last is in Glasgow's Kelvingrove Art Gallery and Museum.

The Eisinga Planetarium built by a wool carder named Eise Eisinga in his own living room, in the small city of Franeker in Friesland, is in fact an orrery. It was constructed between 1774 and 1781. The base of the model faces down from the ceiling of the room, with most of the mechanical works in the space above the ceiling. It is driven by a pendulum clock, which has 9 weights or ponds. The planets move around the model in real time.

An innovative concept is to have people play the role of the moving planets and other Solar System objects. Such a model, called a human orrery, has been laid out at the Armagh Observatory.

In 2024, the LEGO Group commercially produced an orrery of the Sun, Earth, and Moon. The model is assembled exclusively from LEGO elements and reproduces solar and lunar orbits, as well Earth's rotation about a tilted axis.

== In popular culture ==
- The construction system Meccano is a popular tool for constructing highly accurate orreries. Model 391, the first Meccano Orrery, was described in the June 1918 Meccano Manual.

== See also ==
- Antikythera mechanism – Ancient Greek analogue astronomical computer
- Apparent retrograde motion
- Armillary sphere – Model of objects in the sky consisting of a framework of rings
- Astrarium – Timepiece and astronomical prediction device
- Astrolabe – Astronomical instrument
- Astronomical clock – Clock displaying astronomical information
- Celestial globe – Star charts arranged on a globe
- Clockwork universe
- Eidouranion
- Ephemeris
- Equatorium
- Eratosthenes
- John Fulton (instrument maker)
- List of astronomical instruments
- Orbit of the Moon
- Sextant – Tool for angle measurement
- Stability of the Solar System
- Tellurion
- Torquetum
