= John Fulton (instrument maker) =

- John Fulton
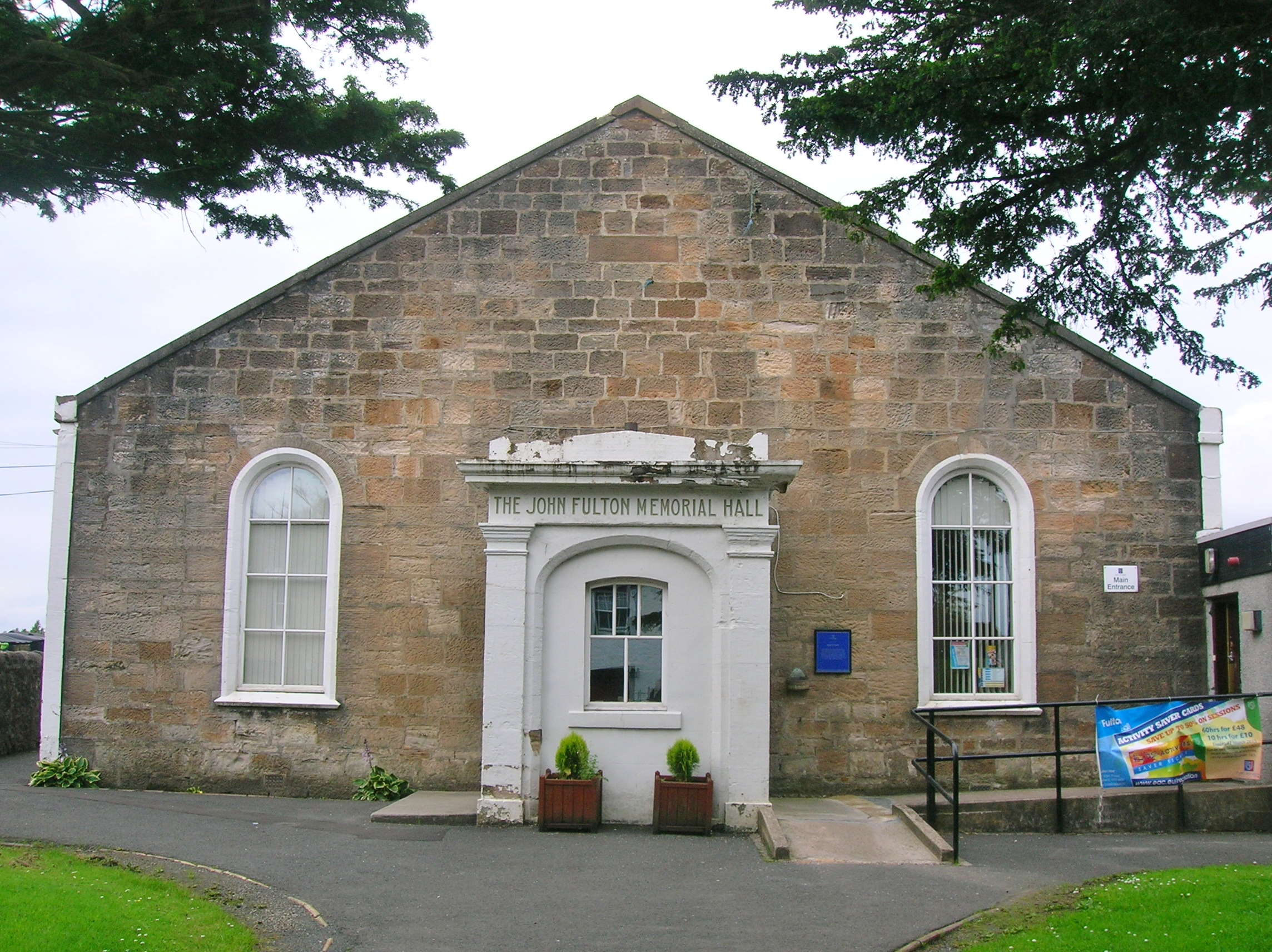
- The John Fulton Memorial Hall
- Born: 1803; Fenwick, East Ayrshire, Scotland
- Died: 1853 (aged 49–50); Fenwick, East Ayrshire, Scotland.
- Burial: Fenwick, East Ayrshire, Scotland.
Names
- John Fulton

John Fulton (1803–1853) was a Scottish instrument maker who originally trained as a cobbler. He built three orreries in a workshop attached to at his home, now demolished, in the Kirton Brae area of Fenwick and was eventually appointed instrument maker to King William IV, moving to London, but retiring to Fenwick. He is buried in the Fenwick Kirk graveyard.

== Life ==
It is recorded that John's father, also a cobbler, was a subscribing member to the library set up in the village by the Fenwick Weavers. With access to this library, John pursued his interest in astronomy, mathematics, physics, and other disciplines that led to his career as an instrument maker of outstanding ability and achievement. Largely self-taught, he studied botany, learned several foreign languages, constructed a ‘velocipede’ or early bicycle, and experimented with the production of coal gas. He had left school at the age of 13.

=== Orreries ===
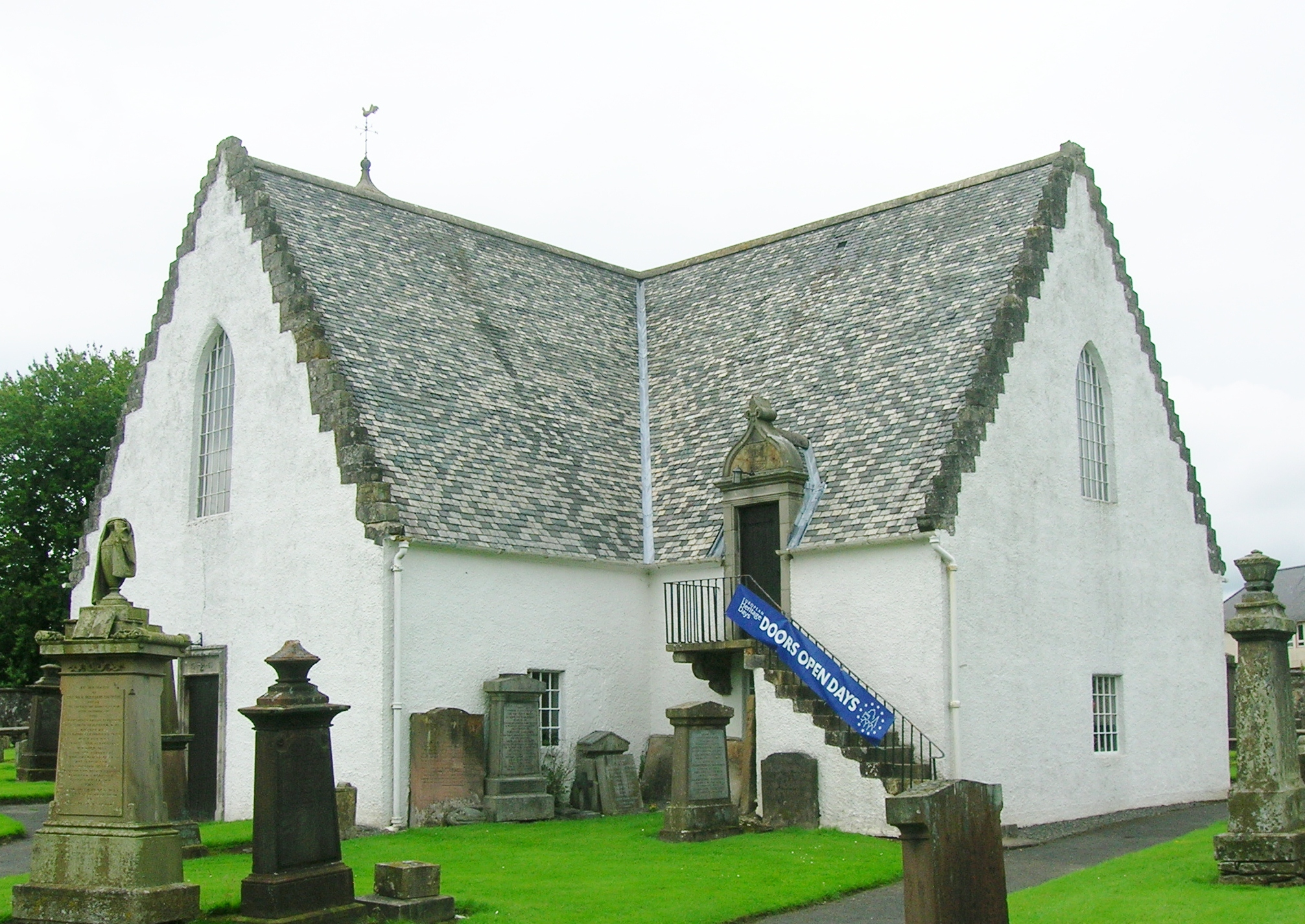
Fenwick Kirk, burial place of John Fulton.

Astronomy held a particular fascination for him, so much so that he was prompted to construct, in his spare time in the years between 1823 and 1833, three working models of the Solar System, known as orreries. The third of these is now on display in Glasgow's Kelvingrove Art Gallery and Museum: it was the most intricate and took him four years to finish. It measured 1000mm x 3000mm x 3000mm. Entirely his own work, it has 175 wheels and more than 200 moving parts and is acknowledged to be one of the best in the world. The Society of Arts, who awarded him a silver medal, calculated that his third orrery was the most perfect built up to that time.

Fulton took the orrery on a tour of the United Kingdom. Such was the public interest that in 1869 a group of Glasgow businessmen led by William Walker bought the orrery for the city. It was brought up from London and then toured around Glasgow schools and museums until the 1930s when it found a more permanent home in the Old Glasgow Museum.

A local story relates that Fulton 'borrowed' his grandmother's candlesticks and melted them down to provide the brass for his first orrery model.

== John Fulton Memorial Hall ==
This is the public meeting hall for Fenwick, maintained by East Ayrshire Council, and is operated by local community organisation Fenwick Community Initiatives. It was previously the Guthrie Memorial Free Church of 1844, and following a worldwide fund raising campaign sufficient funds had been raised by 1919 and the hall was opened in 1920. The hall is a Category C listed building.
