= Fenwick Weavers' Society =

The Fenwick Weavers' Society was a professional association created in the village of Fenwick, East Ayrshire, Scotland by 16 weavers on 14 March 1761. The Fenwick Weavers' Society is considered to be the earliest known co-operative in the world for which full records exist. The society was established during a decline in handloom weaving due to increased mechanisation in the textiles industry and increased expectations on weavers to accept lower payments. The society was originally set up for weavers to support each other, to secure the future of the weaving trade, and to ensure a fair price for work. The agreed terms and conditions of the society included being faithful and honest to one another and their employers, making good sufficient work, and setting prices that were ‘neither higher nor lower than are accustomed in the towns and parishes of the neighbourhood.’

In November 1769, the society expanded its purpose to benefit the wider community and agreed that its funds should be used to buy food in bulk to be sold to members and non-members in smaller quantities for a cut price with the savings divided amongst society members. Some historians argue the Fenwick Weavers’ Society redistribution model was a precursor to the ‘divi’ or dividend model established by the Rochdale Society of Equitable Pioneers and which formed the basis of the modern co-operative movement.

Over time, the society took on other initiatives like a co-operative subscription library, founded in 1808, which resulted in the creation of the Fenwick Library, and setting up an ‘emigration society’ to help Fenwick villagers emigrate to places like New Zealand, Australia, Canada, South Africa and the United States. The society existed until 1873 when the population of Fenwick dropped from 2,000 people to 500 people, partly due to the society’s emigration support programme.

The Society was reconvened in March 2008 and has been reconstituted as a co-operative, in legal form as an industrial and provident society, in order to record, collect and commemorate the heritage of the Fenwick Weavers.

== See also ==
- Crawford, John. "The community library in Scottish history." 68th IFLA Council and General Conference, August 18–24, 2002.
- East Ayrshire Council tourism website
- Carrell, Severin. "Strike Rochdale from the record books. The Co-op began in Scotland", The Guardian, August 7, 2007
- McFadzean, John. "The Co-operators - A History of the Fenwick Weavers". East Ayrshire North Communities Federation Ltd, 2008.
