= Vincenzo Coronelli =

Italian Franciscan friar, cosmographer, cartographer, publisher, and encyclopedist

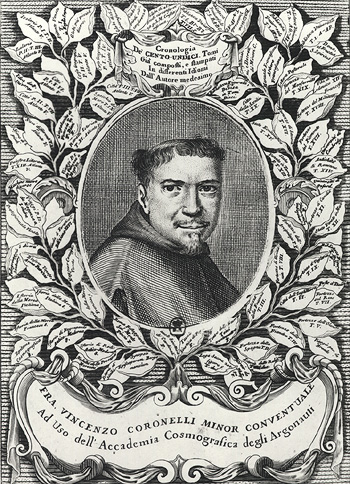
- Coronelli from the frontispiece of the folio edition of Atlante Veneto, c. 1710
- Born: Vincenzo Maria Coronelli; August 16, 1650; Venice, Republic of Venice
- Died: December 9, 1718 (aged 68); Venice, Republic of Venice
- Occupations: Cartographer, friar, encyclopedist
- Known for: Paris Globes, Atlante Veneto
- Parent(s): Maffio Coronelli and Caterina Coronelli

Vincenzo Maria Coronelli (August 16, 1650 – December 9, 1718) was an Italian Franciscan friar, cosmographer, cartographer, publisher, and encyclopedist known in particular for his atlases and globes. He is considered one of the leading geographers and cartographers of the Baroque period.

== Biography ==
Vincenzo Coronelli was born, probably in Venice, on August 16, 1650, the fifth child of a Venetian tailor named Maffio Coronelli. At ten, young Vincenzo was sent to the city of Ravenna and was apprenticed to a xylographer. In 1663 he was accepted into the Conventual Franciscans, becoming a novice in 1665. At age sixteen he published the first of his one hundred forty separate works. In 1671 he entered the Convent of Saint Maria Gloriosa dei Frari in Venice, and in 1672 Coronelli was sent by the order to the College of Saint Bonaventure in Rome where he earned his doctor’s degree in theology in 1674. He excelled in the study of both astronomy and Euclid. A little before 1678, Coronelli began working as a geographer and was commissioned to make a set of terrestrial and celestial globes for Ranuccio II Farnese, Duke of Parma. Each finely crafted globe was five feet in diameter (c. 175 cm) and so impressed the Duke that he made Coronelli his theologian. Coronelli's renown as a theologian grew and in 1699 he was appointed Father General of the Franciscan order.

=== Later life ===
Coronelli worked in various European countries in the following years, before permanently returning to Venice in 1705. Here he started his own cosmographical project and published the volumes of Atlante Veneto. In his home city he founded the very first geographical society, the Accademia Cosmografica degli Argonauti in 1684. He also held the position of Cosmographer of the Republic of Venice. Later six volumes of the Biblioteca Universale Sacro-Profana were published by Coronelli. This was a kind of encyclopedia, its compiled entries ordered alphabetically.

Coronelli died at the age of 68 in Venice, having created hundreds of maps in his lifetime.

The International Coronelli Society for the Study of Globes, founded 1952 in Vienna, is named in Coronelli’s honor.

== Globes for Louis XIV ==
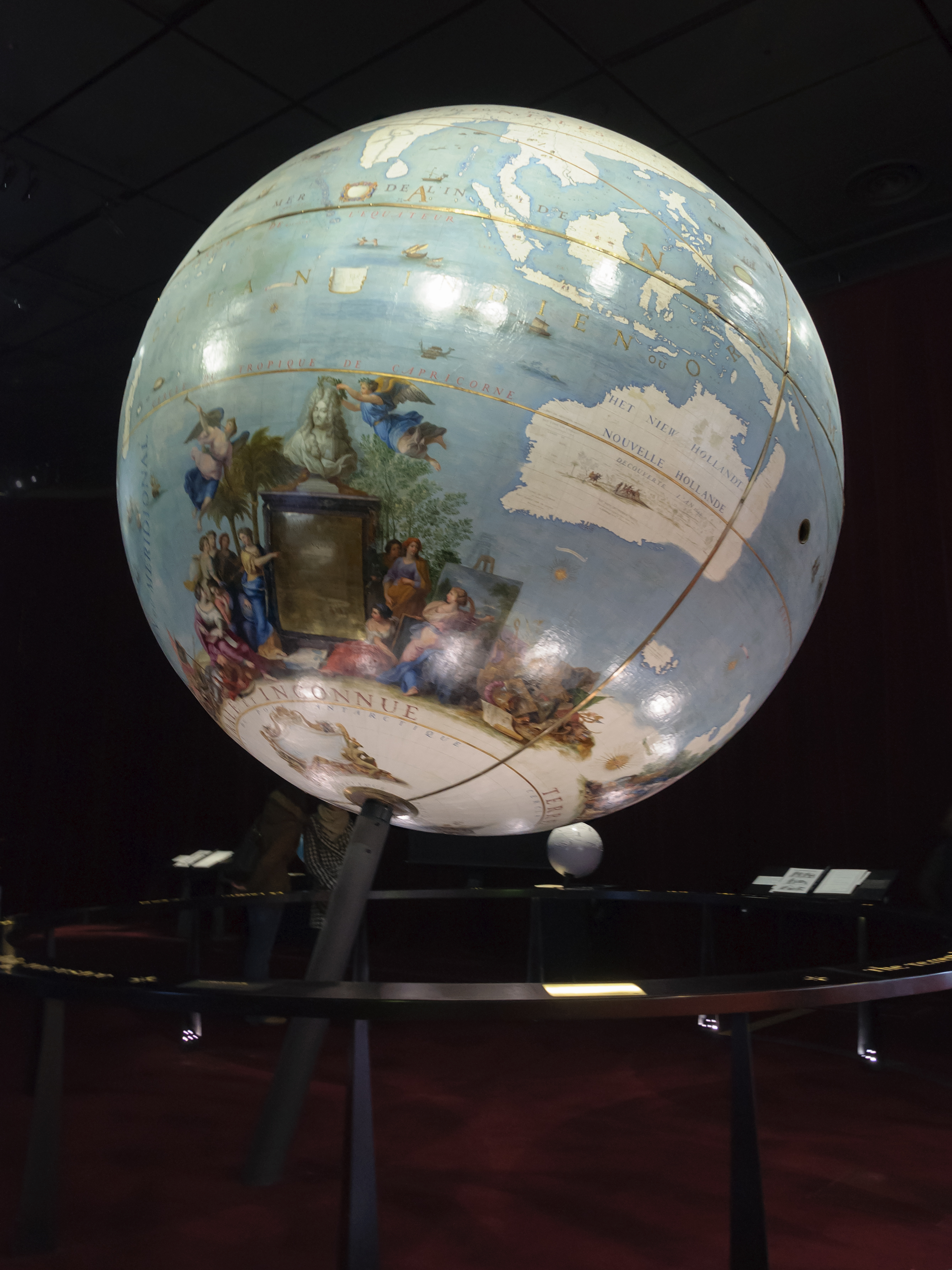
The terrestrial globe Coronelli made for Louis XIV.

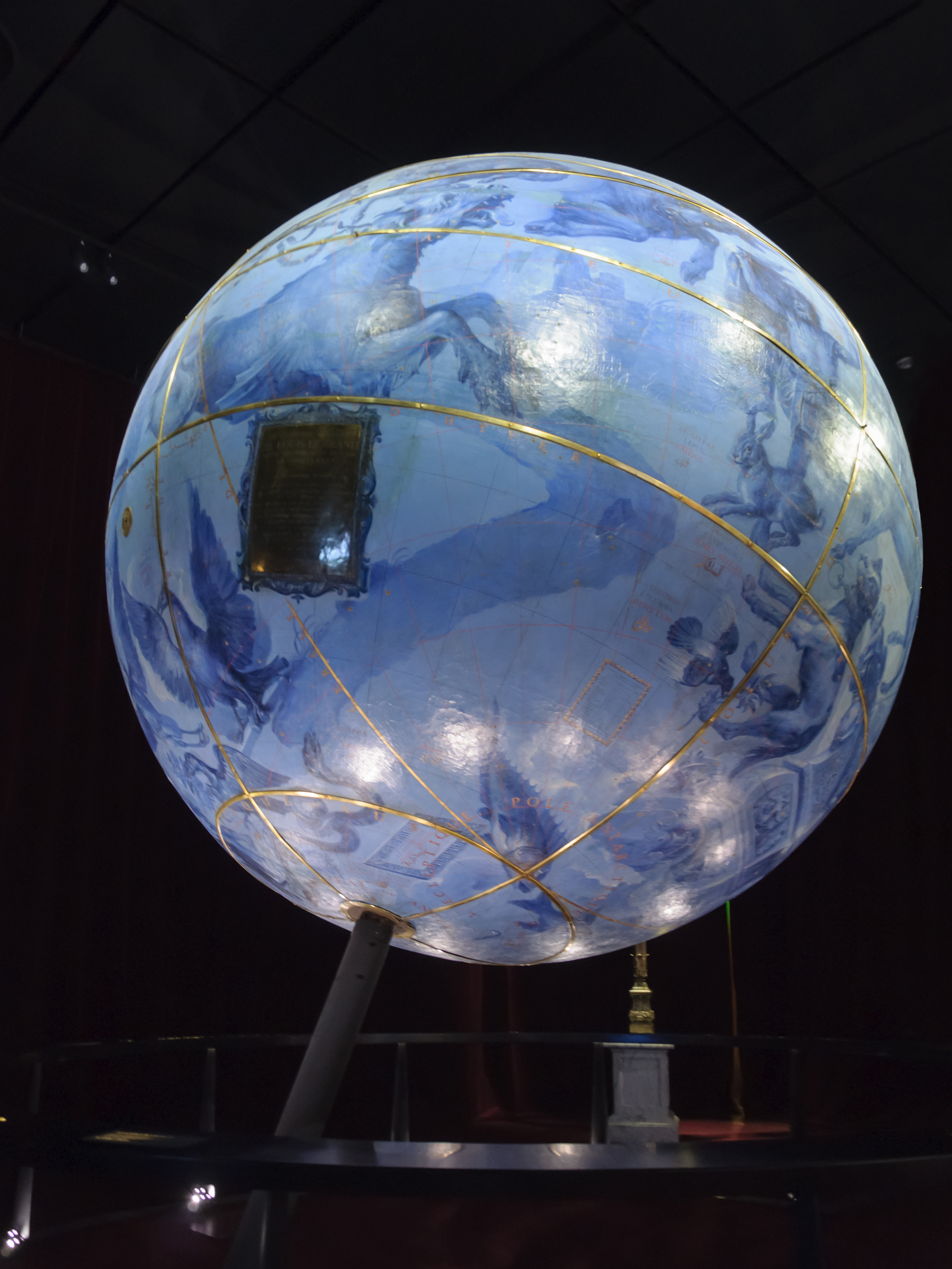
The celestial globe Coronelli made for Louis XIV.

Cardinal César d'Estrées, friend and adviser to Louis XIV and ambassador to Rome, saw the Duke of Parma’s magnificent globes and invited Coronelli to Paris in 1681 to construct a pair of globes for the Most Christian King. Coronelli moved to the French capital in 1681, where he lived for two years. Each globe was composed of spindles of bent timber about ten feet long and four inches broad at the equator. This wood was then coated with a layer of plaster about an inch thick and covered in a layer of strong unfinished fabric. This was then wrapped in a quarter-inch layer of two very fine fabrics which provided backing for the painted information of the globes. These globes, measuring 384 cm in diameter and weighing approximately 2 tons, are displayed in the Bibliothèque nationale François Mitterrand in Paris. The globes depicted the latest information of French explorations in North America, particularly the expeditions of René-Robert Cavelier, Sieur de La Salle.

== Current locations of 110cm globes ==
Other 110cm diameter Coronelli globes are at

- the National Library of Austria (two pairs of 110cm diameter globes are on display in the Prunksaal)
- a pair in the Globe Museum in Vienna,
- in the library of Stift Melk,
- in Trier, Prague,
- Paris,
- the British Library, London (celestial globe only),
- Washington D.C.,
- the Palazzo Poggi in Bologna (terrestrial globe only),
- Palazzo Sacchetti in Rome,
- the Museo della Specola in Bologna (terrestrial globe only),
- the Observatory of Strasbourg (celestial globe only)
- a pair at Muzeum Narodowe w Warszawie in Poland,
- Poznań Town Hall (terrestrial globe only)
- a pair in the Biblioteca Federiciana in Fano.
- Having been restored and completed, another 1688 terrestrial globe is displayed at the Southwest Collection/Special Collections Library of Texas Tech University in Lubbock, Texas.
- The Ransom Center at The University of Texas in Austin has a pair of Coronelli globes both the 1688 Terrestrial and the Celestial (n.d.).
- a pair in the Biblioteca Marciana in Venice
- a pair in the Library Angelo Mai in Bergamo, while another two globes are now in restoration being part of the FAI project "Save the Globes".

== Selected maps ==
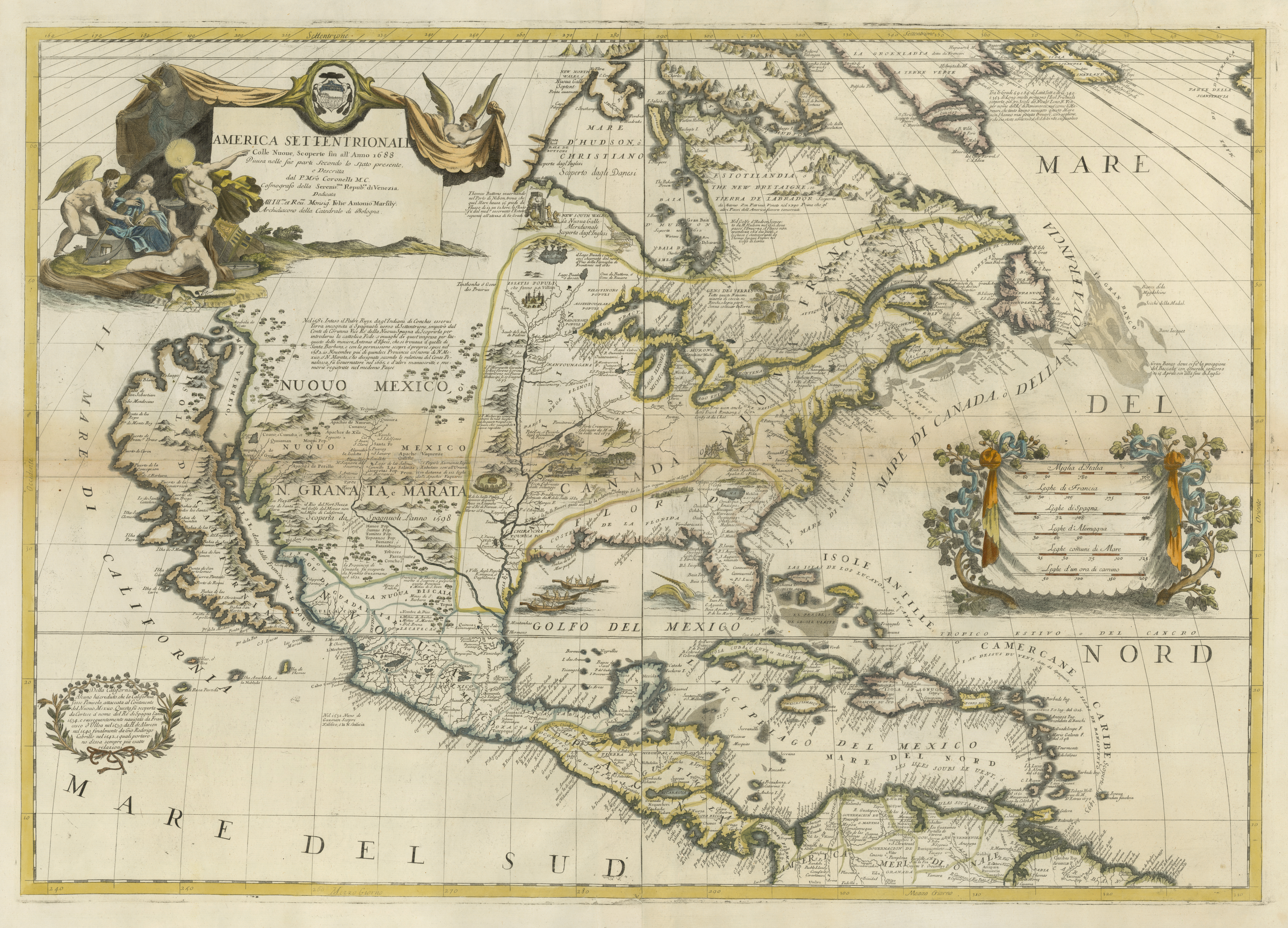
America Settentrionale Colle Nuove Scoperte fin all' Anno 1688, from Atlante Veneto

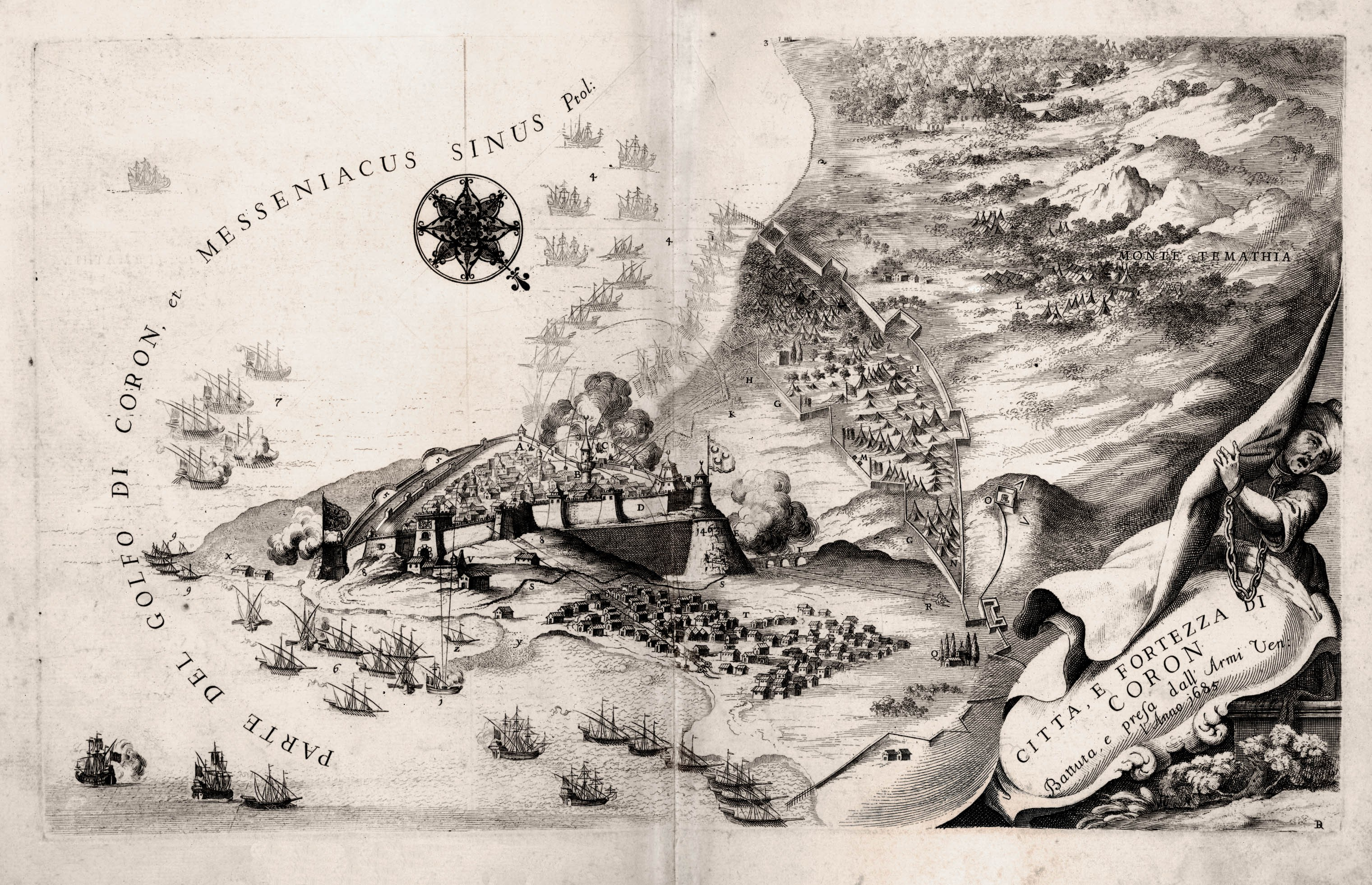
The siege of Coron in Greece by the Venetians during the Morean War

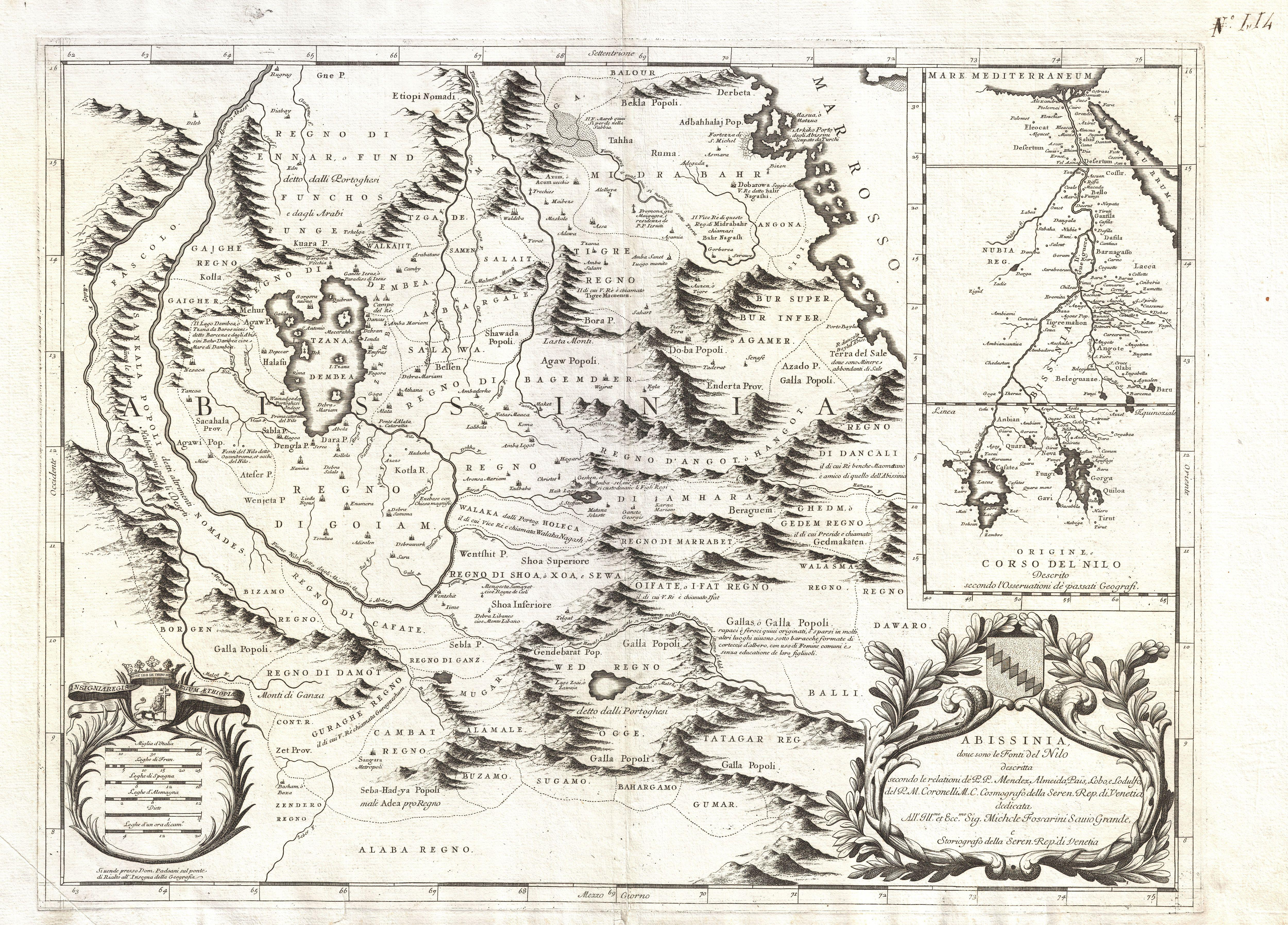
"Abissinia, doue sono le Fonti del Nilo descritta secondo le relationi de P.P. Mendez, Almeida, Pais, Lobo, e Lodulfo del P. M. Coronelli M.C. Cosmografo della Seren. Rep. di Venetia"--Vincenzo Coronelli (1690)

1. 1690-91 Atlante Veneto
2. 1696-97 Isolario dell' Atlante Veneto
3. 1696 Londra
4. 1692 Corso geografico universale
5. 1695 Re-issued
6. 1693 Epitome Cosmografica
7. 1693 Libro dei Globi
8. 1701 Re-issued
9. 1695 World Map
10. 1696 Pacific Ocean

== Partial bibliography ==
- Morea, Negroponte & Adiacenze (1686).
- Atlante Veneto (1691 - 1696).
- Ritratti de celebri Personaggi (1697).
- Lo Specchio del Mare (1698).
- Singolarità di Venezia (1708-1709).
- Roma antico-moderna (1716).

== Bibliography ==
- Kish, George (1970). "Coronelli, Vincenzo Maria". In Charles Coulston Gillispie (ed.). Dictionary of Scientific Biography. Vol. 3. New York: Charles Scribner's Sons. p. 421.
