= Atlante Veneto =

Atlas by Vincenzo Maria Coronelli

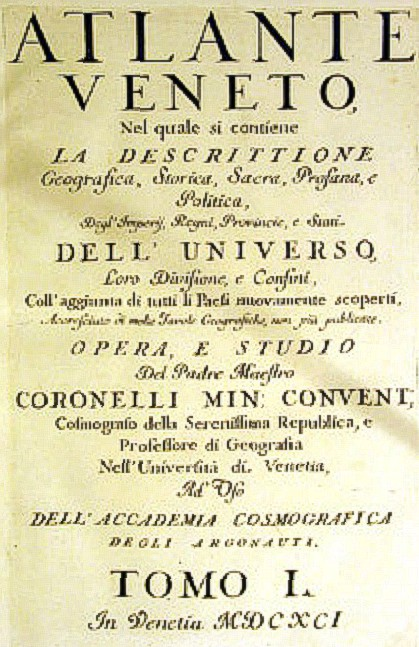
Title page of Atlante Veneto

One of the maps in Atlante Veneto

Atlante Veneto (1690–1701) was a comprehensive atlas published by the Franciscan geographer Vincenzo Maria Coronelli and intended as a continuation of the Blaeu Atlas Maior. This monumental work was published in thirteen folios and provided a wealth of detail covering ancient and modern cartographers and geographers, together with astronomical and historical data. These maps were engraved in a bold style and printed on fine white paper, the more important ones spread over two sheets, allowing for great detail.

The first part comprises an introduction to geography with engravings of globes, wind roses, and cosmographic systems through the ages from Ptolemy, Copernicus and Tycho Brahe to Descartes.

The second part deals exclusively with the earth, starting with a map by Ptolemy, and two modern maps, each covering a hemisphere, followed by two double-page maps of Europe, Asia, Africa, North and South America, ending with maps of the North and South Pole.

The third part deals with hydrography - the oceans, rivers, lakes and deltas. Here are to be found maps of the Pacific and Atlantic Oceans, the Bosporus, Gulf of Venice and rivers such as the Niger River, Amazon River, Rhine, Danube, and Volga.

The final part describes the ships that explored these waters.
