= International Coronelli Society for the Study of Globes =

Non-profit academic organization

The International Coronelli Society for the Study of Globes (German: Internationale Coronelli-Gesellschaft für Globenkunde) is a non-profit academic organization devoted to the analysis, restoration and comprehensive study of terrestrial and celestial globes and other cosmographical instruments, such as armillary spheres and planetaria, mainly made before 1850.

== History ==
Founded in Vienna in 1952 by the Austrian engineer and private scholar Robert Haardt (1884–1962), the Society's name is an hommage to Franciscan friar, cosmographer, cartographer, and publisher Vincenzo Coronelli (1650–1718). As of 2023, the Society counts around 300 members from academic institutions around the world.

The eponymous Coronelli was not only a renowned producer of large-scale globe pairs, but also the founder of the first geographical society in the world, the Venetian Accademia Cosmografica degli Argonauti.

== Activities ==
Since 1963, it has furthered the study of globe-related topics, including inventorying, restoration and conservation, which have been discussed in dedicated international symposia.

The Society awards two international prizes, The International Coronelli-Society Award for Encouragement of Globestudies, and the Fiorini-Haardt Prize for research into pre-1945 globes and their makers.

== Publications ==
Since its foundation in 1952, the society publishes a journal, Der Globusfreund: Wissenschaftliche Zeitschrift für Globenkunde. Since 2002 there is an English-language version with the title Globe Studies.

== See also ==
- Early world maps
- Gemma Frisius
- Globe Museum
