= Tellurion =

Type of clock

A tellurion (also spelled tellurian, tellurium, and yet another name is loxocosm), is a clock, typically of French or Swiss origin, surmounted by a mechanism that depicts how day, night, and the seasons are caused by the rotation and orientation of Earth on its axis and its orbit around the Sun. The clock normally also displays the phase of the Moon and the four-year (perpetual) calendar.

It is related to the orrery, which illustrates the relative positions and motions of the planets and moons in the Solar System in a heliocentric model.

The word tellurion derives from the Latin tellus, meaning "earth".

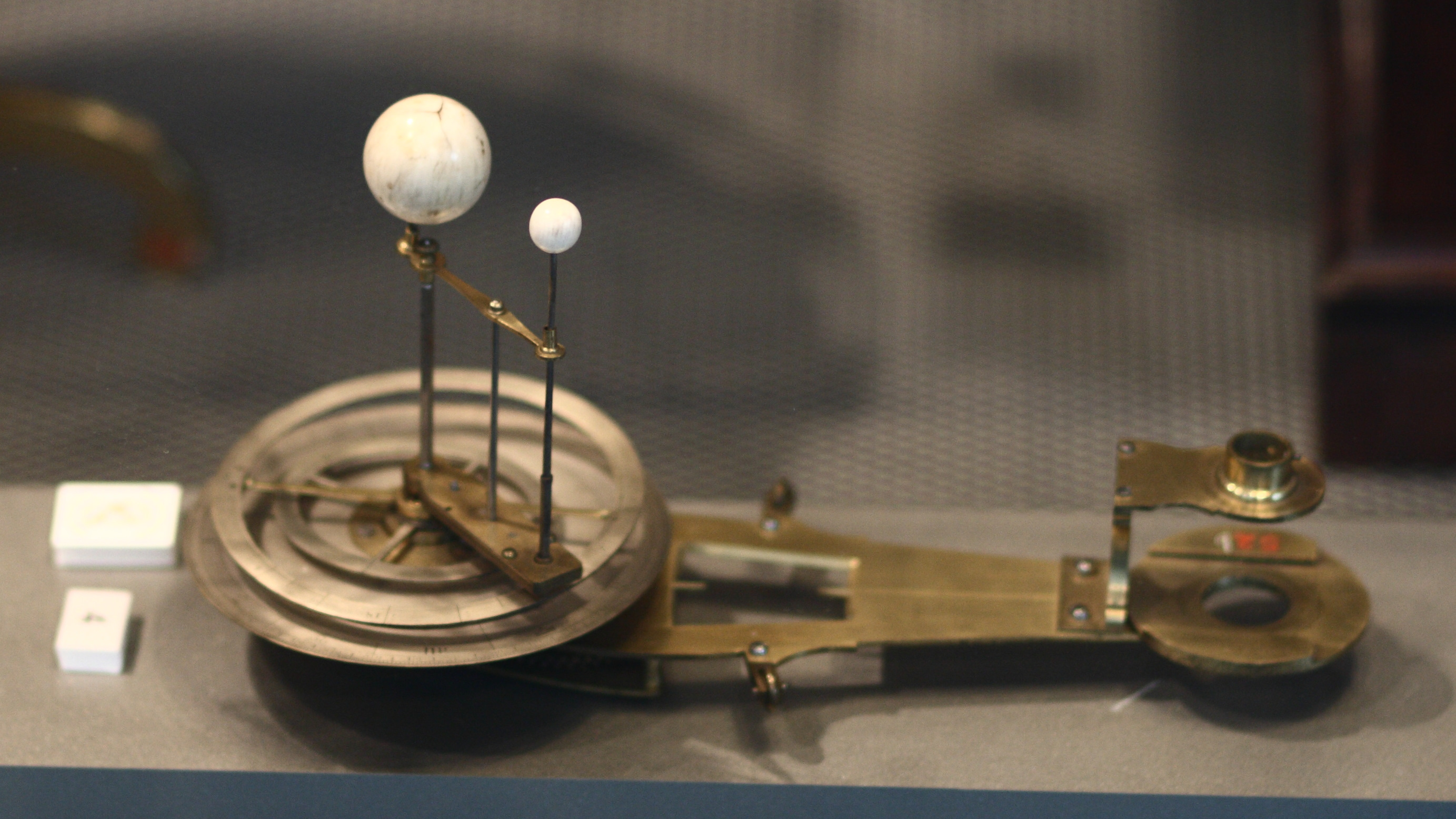
A tellurion made in 1766, used by John Winthrop to teach astronomy at Harvard

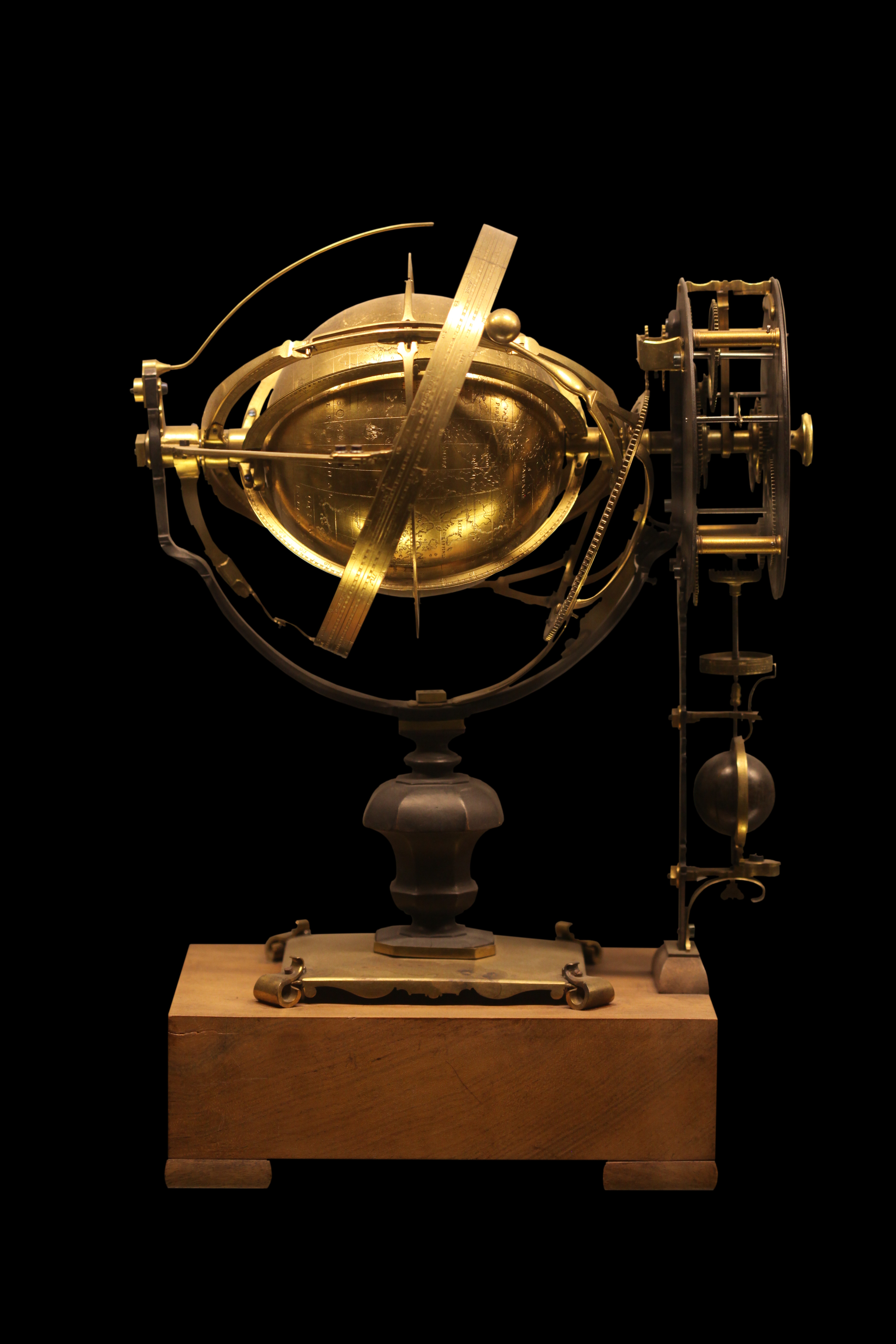
Tellurion made between 1700 and 1725, on display at the Musée des Arts et Métiers, Paris

== See also ==
- Astronomical clock
- Solar System models
