= Fenwick, East Ayrshire =

Village in Scotland

Coordinates: 55.6604°N 4.4412°W

Fenwick
- Location within East Ayrshire
- Population: 1,170 (2020)
- Language: English; Scots; Scottish Gaelic
- Council area: East Ayrshire
- Lieutenancy area: Ayrshire and Arran
- Country: Scotland
- Sovereign state: United Kingdom
- Dialling code: 01563
- Police: Scotland
- Fire: Scottish
- Ambulance: Scottish
- UK Parliament: Kilmarnock and Loudoun
- Scottish Parliament: Kilmarnock and Irvine Valley

Fenwick is a village in East Ayrshire, Scotland. In 2019, its population was estimated to be 989. Fenwick is the terminus of the M77 following its extension, which was opened in April 2005, at the beginning of the Kilmarnock bypass.

== History ==
The Fenwick Weavers' Society was founded in Fenwick in 1761 and is considered one of the first co-operatives in the world.

Fenwick Parish Church dates back to 1643, with Rev. Colin Strong currently overseeing its leadership. The Primary School in Fenwick currently feeds to Loudoun Academy in Galston. In summer 2017, the primary school underwent an extension that saw a new gym hall built and the old dinner hall and hut demolished.

The two main areas of Fenwick are High Fenwick and Laigh Fenwick, referring directly to the area of housing and community at the top of Kirkton Road and the area of housing at the bottom. There remains a friendly rivalry between these two areas which culminates with the annual Fenwick gala cricket match where the two sides face off against each other.

John Fulton Hall is in Fenwick. The Post Office (which is located on the Main Street) moved closer to the main hub of the village in the 1990s. The old location of the Post Office has since been occupied by several businesses.

== Notable people ==
- George Allan was minister and shot several films of the village.
- William Guthrie, minister and author of The Christian's Great Interest
- John Paton, Covenanter, army captain, executed in the Grassmarket
- Rev James Barr leader of the United Free Church Continuing and politician
