= Mathematisch-Physikalischer Salon =

Museum of historic clocks and scientific instruments

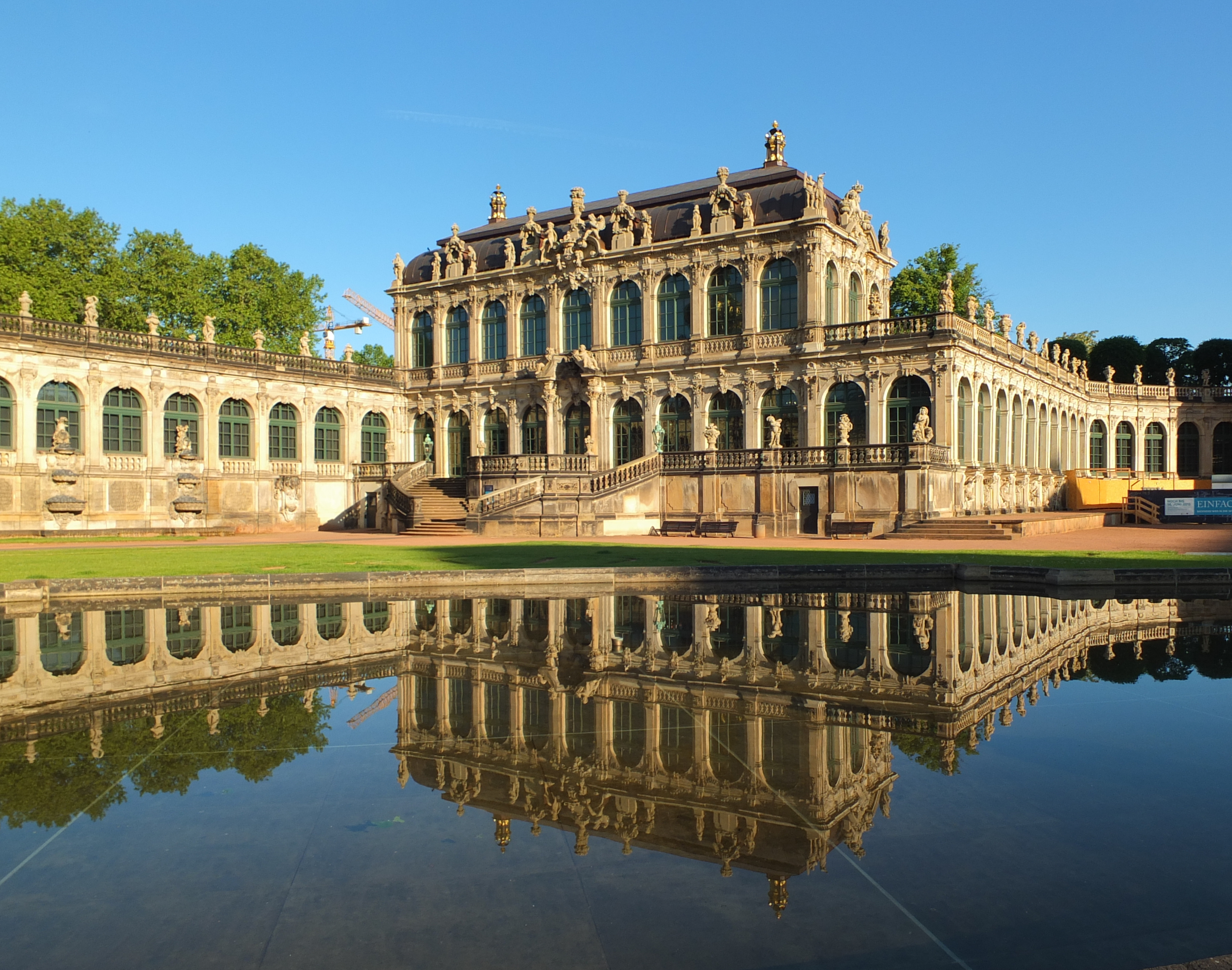
- The Zwinger which houses the museum
- Interactive fullscreen map
- Location: Dresden, Germany
- Coordinates: 51°03′12″N 13°43′58″E

The Mathematisch-Physikalischer Salon (German: [mateˈmaːtɪʃ fyziˈkaːlɪʃɐ zaˈloːn], Royal Cabinet of Mathematical and Physical Instruments) in Dresden, Germany, is a museum of historic clocks and scientific instruments. Its holdings include terrestrial and celestial globes, astronomical, optical and geodetic devices dating back to the 16th century, as well as historic instruments for calculating and drawing length, mass, temperature and air pressure.

The Mathematisch-Physikalischer Salon is part of the Staatliche Kunstsammlungen Dresden (State Art Collections). It is located in the Zwinger.

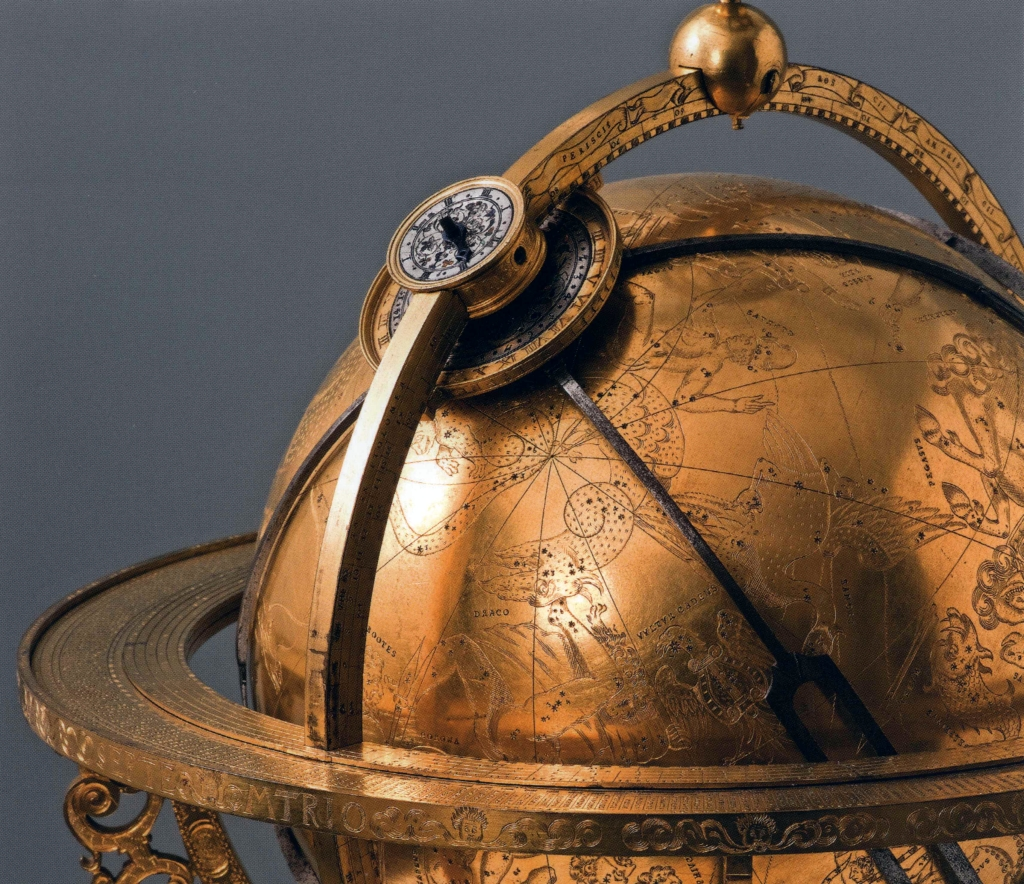
Celestial globe from 1586

== Today's presentation ==
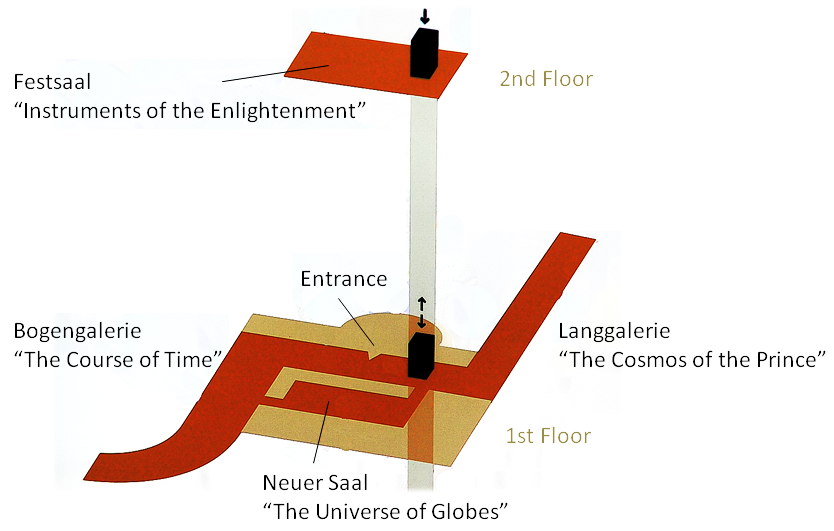
Map of the four exhibition areas

After a general reconstruction of the Zwinger, the museum has been reopened April 14, 2013. The new exhibition presents about 500 historical scientific instruments. They are shown in four chapters.

- The Cosmos of the Prince: Mechanical marvels and mathematical instruments from around 1600.
- The Universe of Globes: Terrestrial and celestial globes from seven centuries.
- Instruments of the Enlightenment: Collection of large telescopes and burning mirrors, the salon in the 18th century.
- The Course of Time: Clocks, watches, and automata since the renaissance.
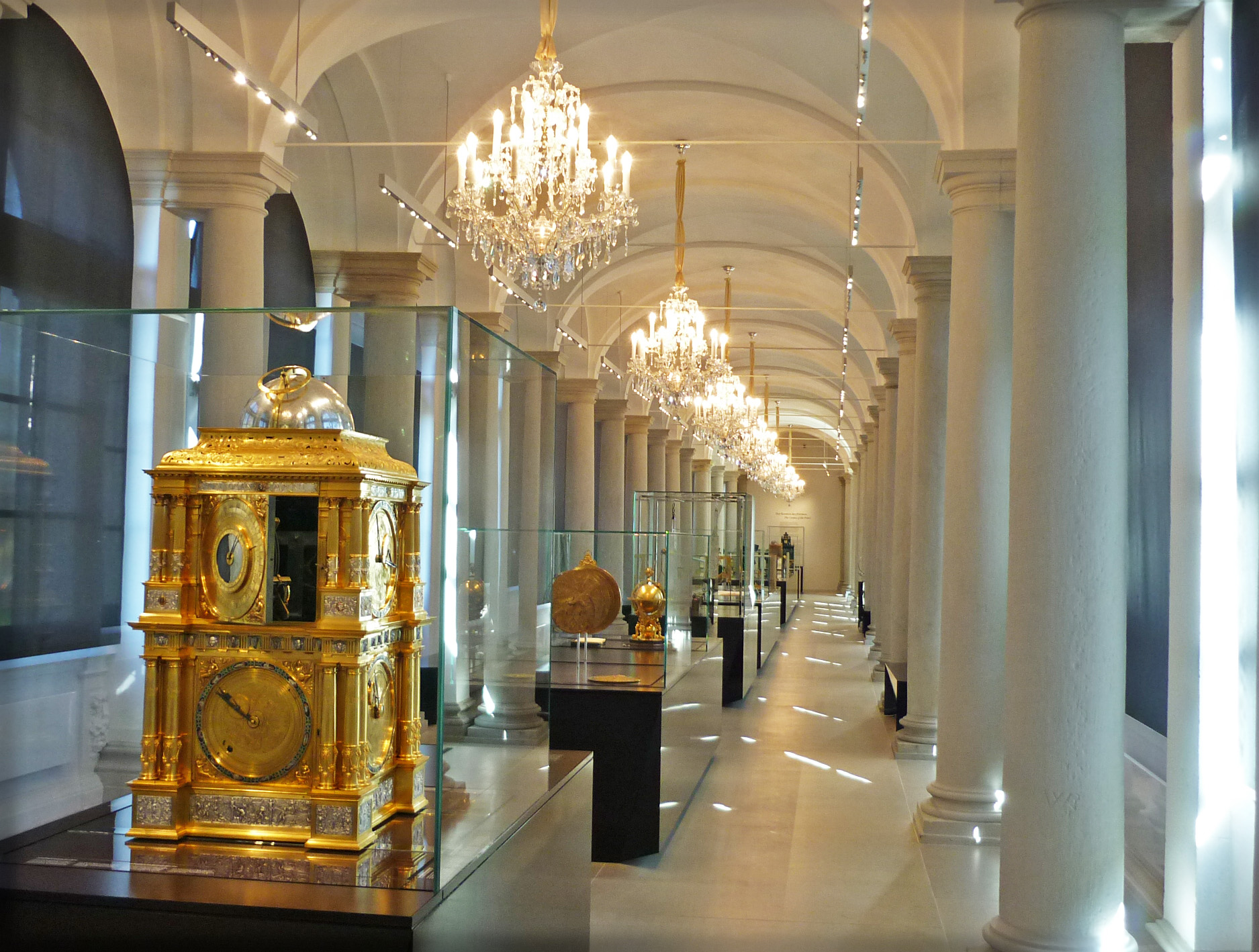
Mechanical instruments in The Cosmos of the Prince

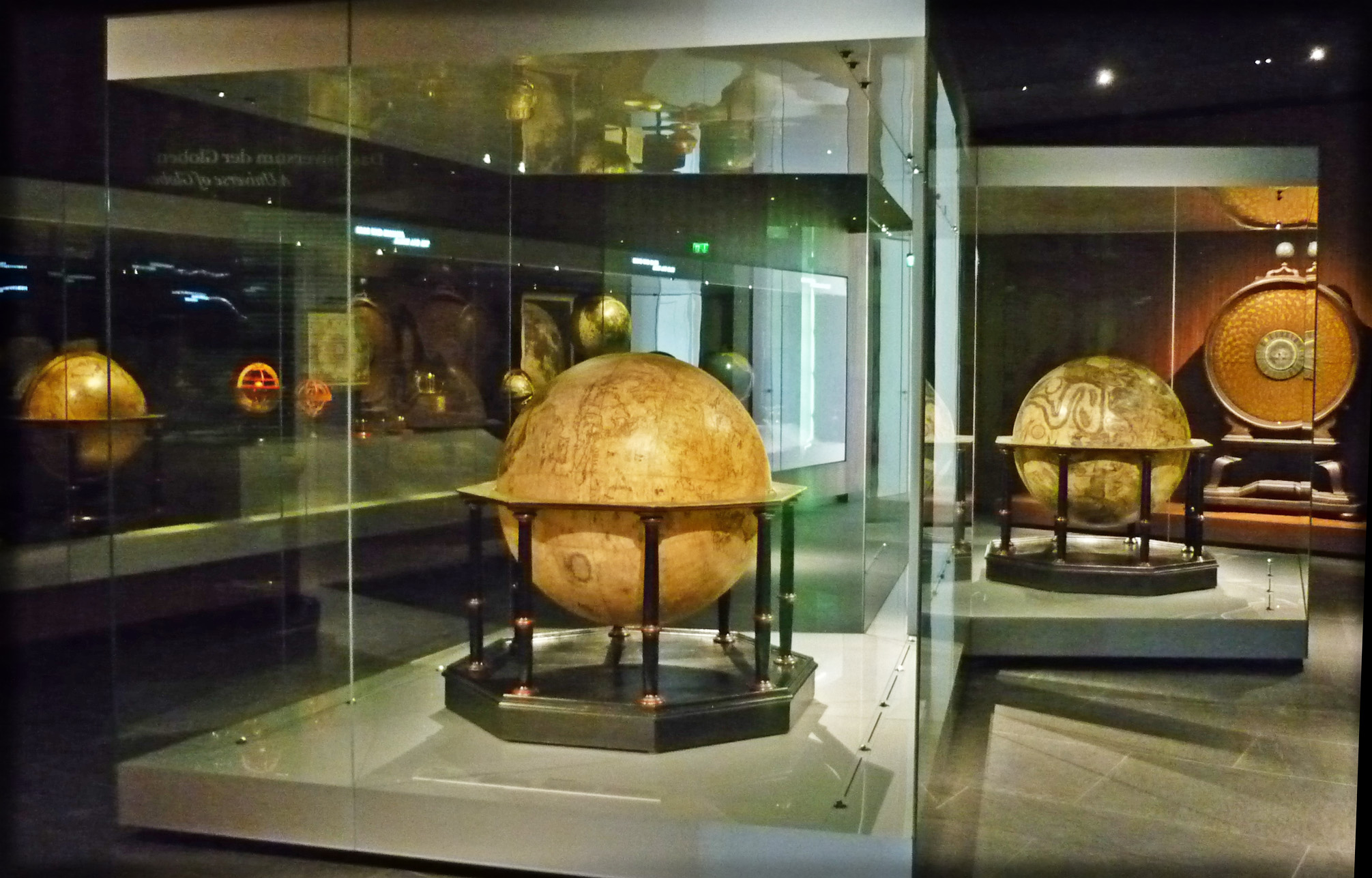
Globes in The Universe of Globes

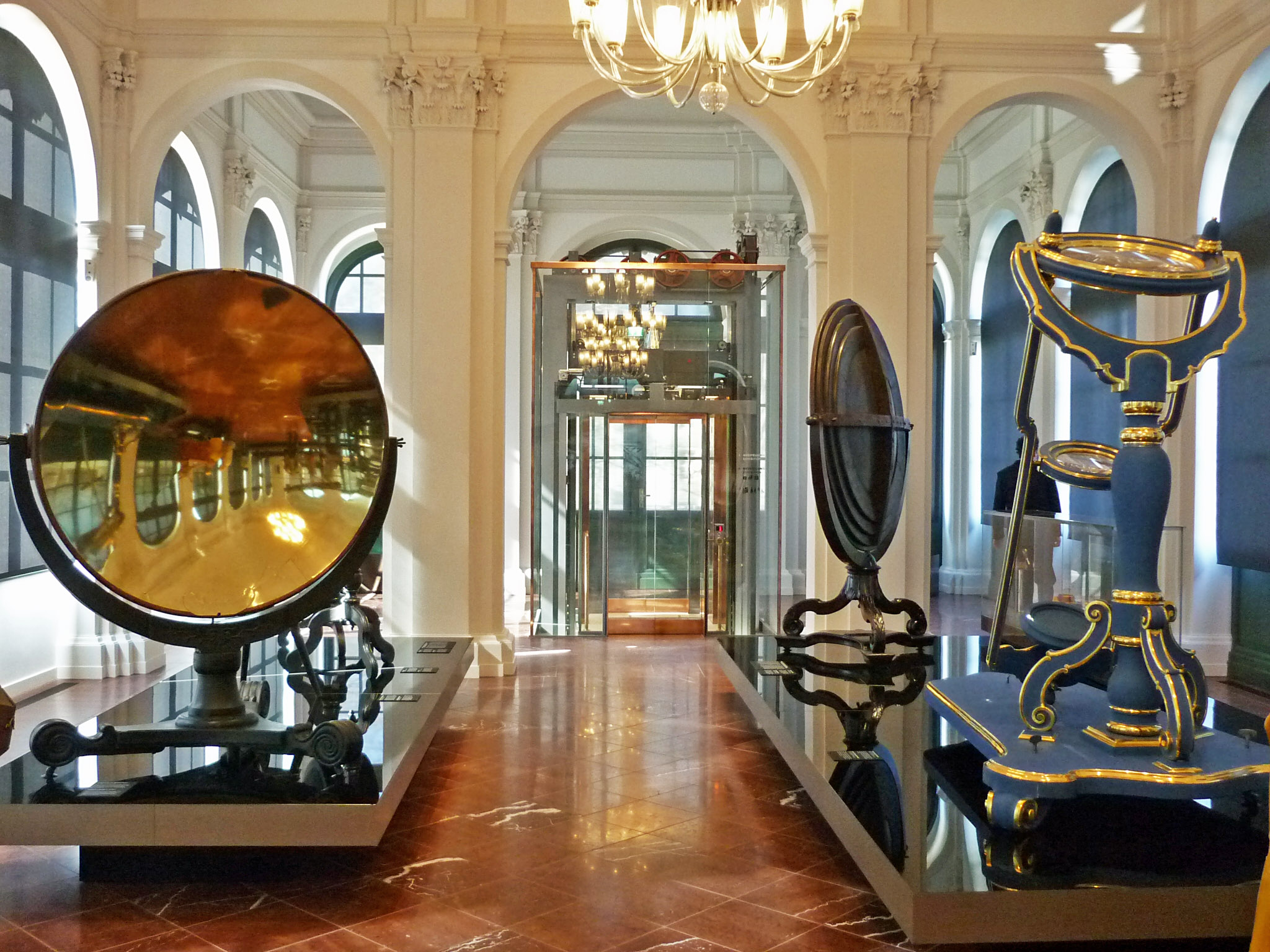
Telescopes in Instruments of the Enlightenment

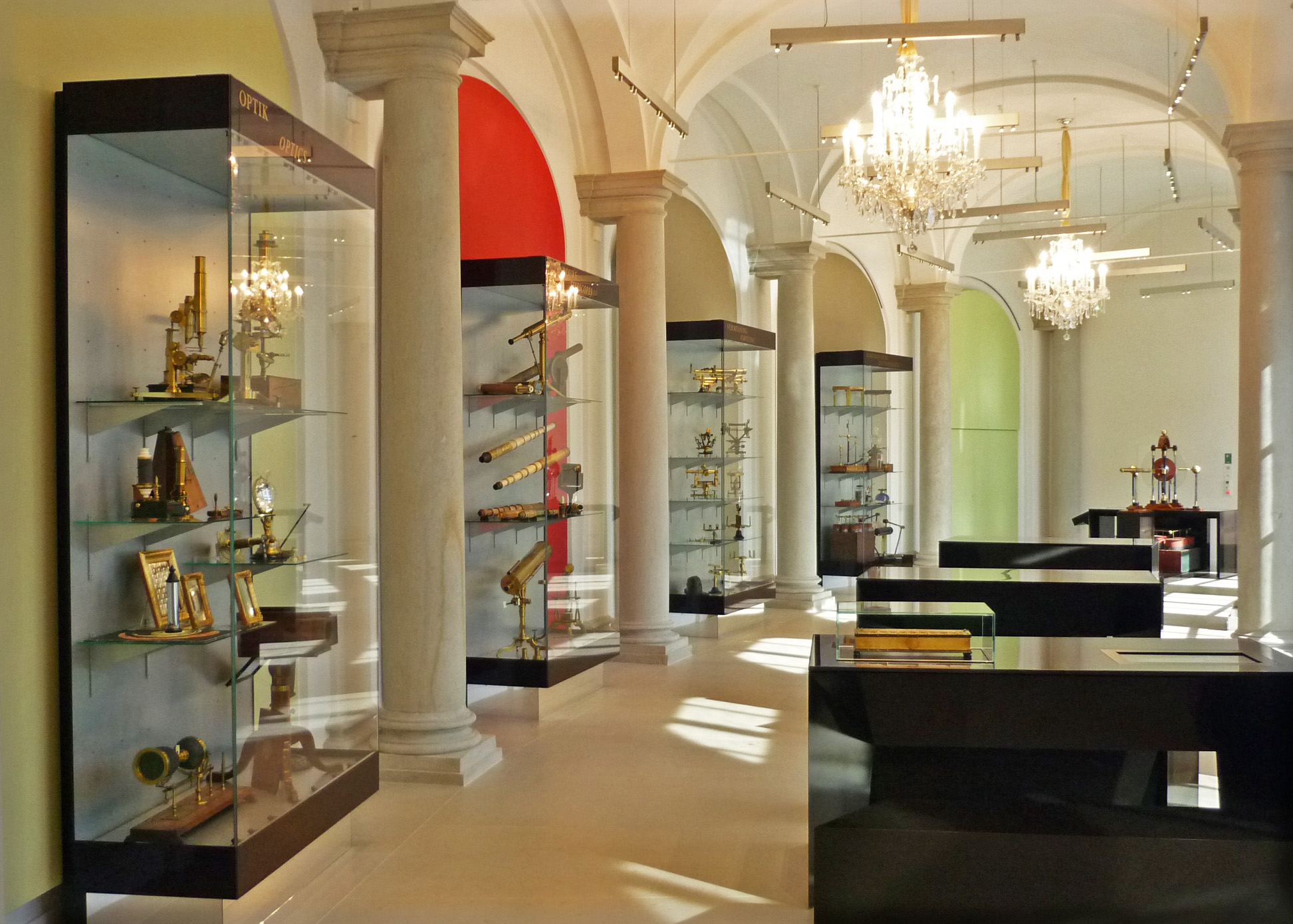
Clocks and watches in The Course of Time
