= River Irvine =

River in southwest Scotland

Coordinates: 55°36′N 4°42′W

Irvine
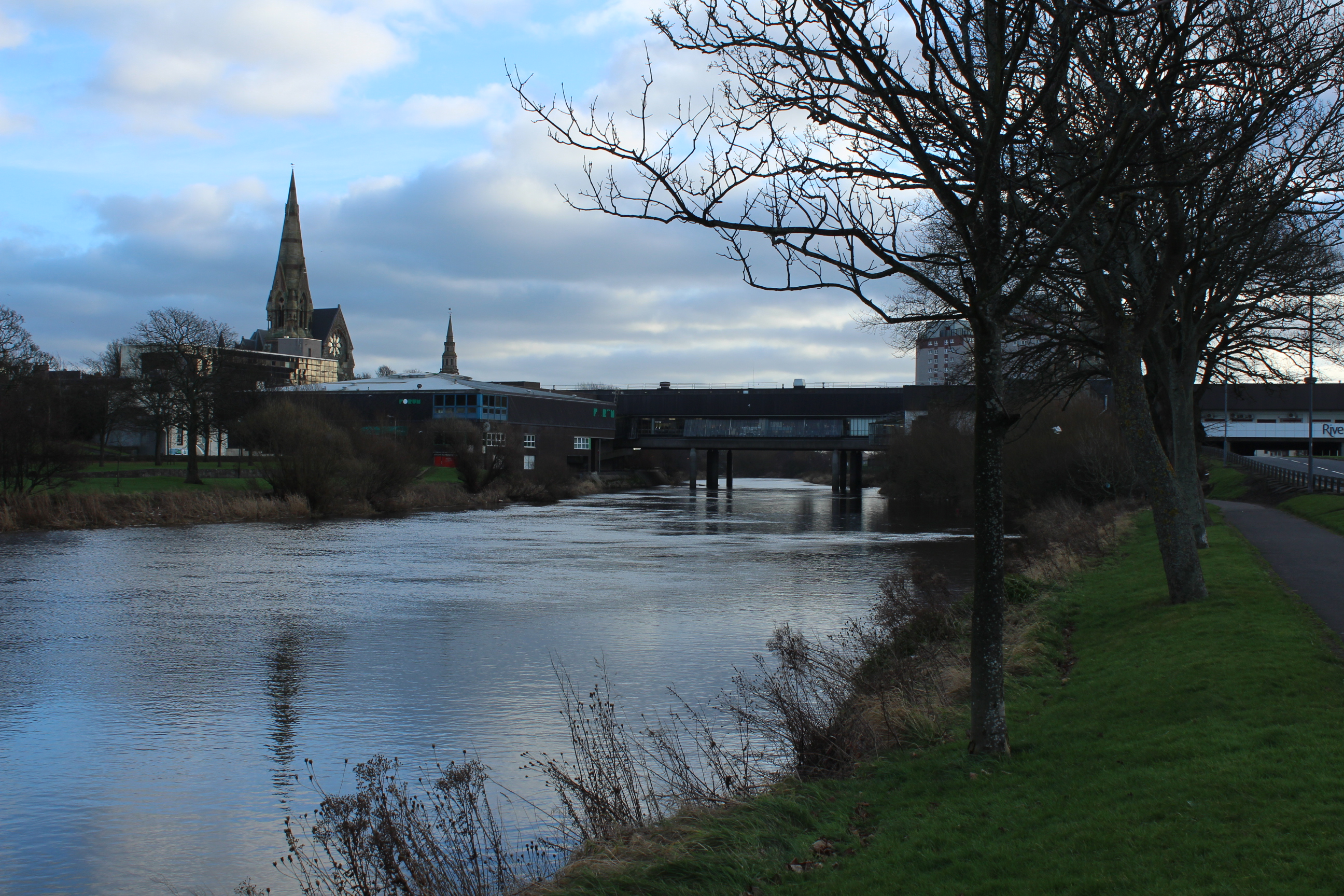
- The River Irvine as it passes through the town centre of Irvine, North Ayrshire

Location
- Country: Scotland

Physical characteristics
- Source
  - location: near Loudoun Hill, Drumclog, Lanarkshire, Scotland
  - elevation: 810 ft (250 m)
- Mouth
  - location: Firth of Clyde
- Length: 42 km (26 mi)
- Basin size: 380 km^{2} (150 sq mi)

The River Irvine (Scottish Gaelic: Irbhinn) is a river that flows through southwest Scotland. Its watershed is on the Lanarkshire border of Ayrshire at an altitude of 810 feet (250 m) above sea-level, near Loudoun Hill, Drumclog, and 7 miles (11 kilometres) SW by W of Strathaven. It flows 29 1/2 mi (47.5 km) westward, dividing the old district of Cunninghame from that of Kyle, until it reaches the sea via Irvine Harbour in the form of the Firth of Clyde, and flows into Irvine Bay by the town of Irvine. It has many tributaries, some of which form parish, district and other boundaries.

== Etymology ==
Irvine was first recorded in 1258 as Yrewyn, and several etymologies have been proposed. According to Groome, Irvine is derived from the Gaelic iar-an meaning 'westward-flowing' river. A Brittonic origin is also possible. The root *arb-īno, meaning "wild turnip", has been suggested (cf. Welsh erfin), though the earliest record and the possibly identical River Irfon in Wales do not encourage this. The Middle Welsh adjective erbyn, meaning "hostility, fighting against", might also be considered here. An ancient river-name formation of very obscure origin is also quite probable.

== The course of the Irvine and its tributaries ==
The River Irvine rises in two head-waters, the one in a moss at Meadow-head, on the eastern boundary of the parish of Loudoun or of Ayrshire, and the other a mile eastward in the parish of Avondale in Lanarkshire, near the battle-field of Drumclog.

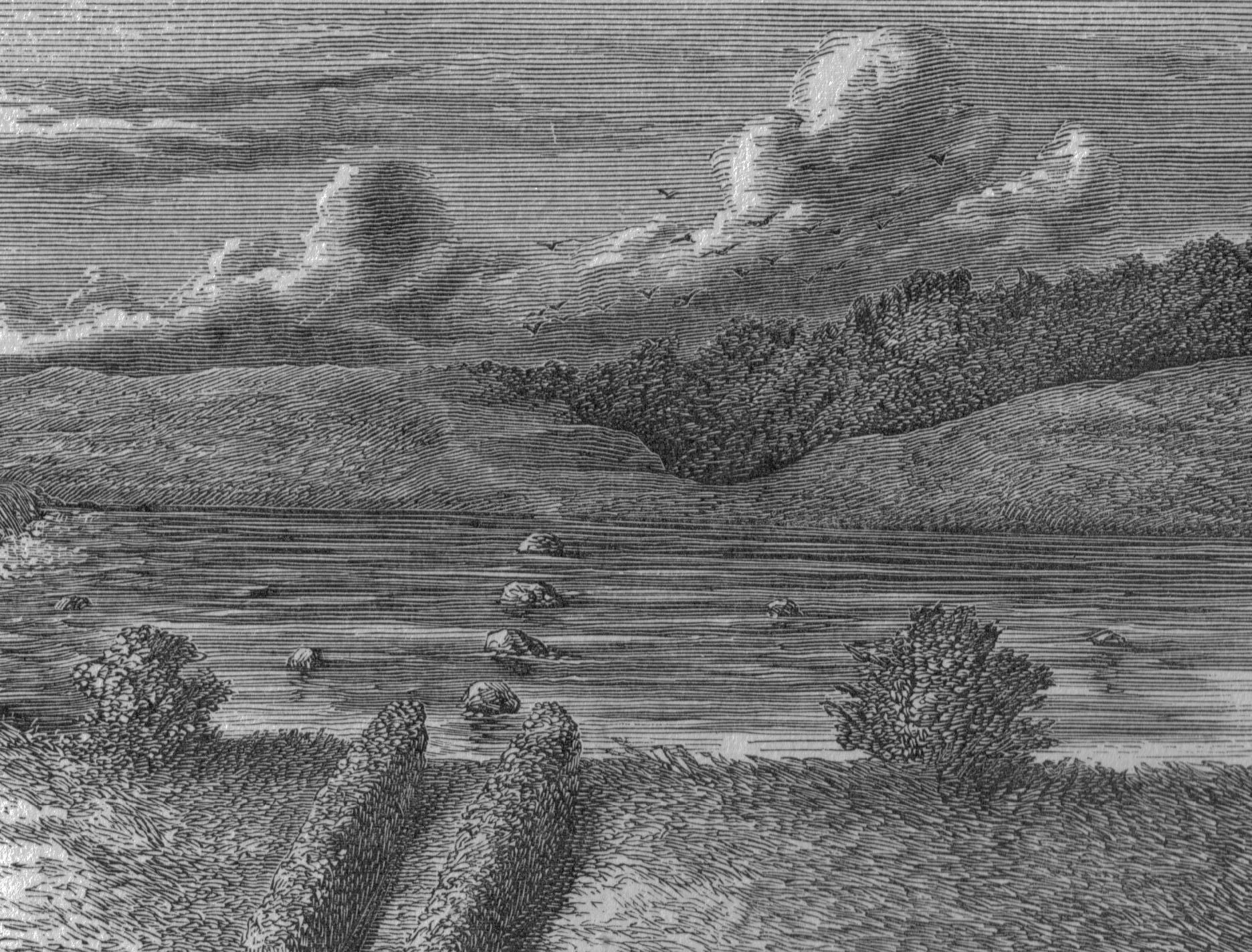
19th-century stepping stones that used to be at Struthers Farm on the River Irvine in East Ayrshire, near Crookedholm

About 2 3/4 miles (4.4 km) from the point it enters Ayrshire, Glen Water joins it from the north. Strictly speaking Glen Water is the parent stream, because it is longer and carries more water; for the Glen Water rises at Crosshill in Renfrewshire, a mile (1.6 km) north of the East Ayrshire boundary, and runs 6 miles (9.7 km) southward, joined by five rills (small streams) in its progress, to the point of confluence with the Irvine. Swollen by the Glen Water, the Irvine immediately passes the town of Darvel on the right, then 1 3/4 miles (2.8 km) onward, the town of Newmilns and 2 1/4 miles (3.6 km) farther on, the town of Galston, on the left. The Hagg burn joins before the town, having run past the old ruined castle of Arclowden: Old Loudoun Castle or "The Old Place", near the present Loudoun castle. The Burnanne joins at Galston.

One and a quarter miles (2.0 km) below Galston it receives from the north the Polbaith burn; 3/4 of a mile (1.2 km) lower down, the Cessnock water joins it from the south; and 3 miles (4.8 km) later it passes Kilmarnock and Riccarton on opposite sides, and receives on its right bank the tributary of the Kilmarnock (or Marnock) Water. Four miles (6.4 km) or more along its bed, Carmel Water joins it on the right bank; and 2 1/2 miles (4.0 km) farther on, it receives the Annick Water, again on the right bank. The river now runs 1 1/2 miles (2.4 km) in a north-west direction, passing through the town of Irvine; it then suddenly bends round until it follows a southerly direction; and opposite the town of Irvine, when running southward, it suddenly expands into a basin 3/4 of a mile (1.2 km) wide. It receives the Garnock river at its north-west extremity, and communicates by a narrow mouth or strait with the Firth (previously Frith) of Clyde. The course of the Irvine is recorded as having shifted in an old Eglinton Estates document, a map recording the previous course with a note that the water left the old riverbed in 1758. This altered the confluence of the River Irvine with the Annick Water.

The Irvine is tidal as far as the nature reserve at Shewalton, one-half mile (800 m) or so upstream from the confluence with the Annick Water.

The main contributing rivers and rivulets in descending order of their confluences are therefore the Glen Water, Polbaith Burn, Cessnock Water, Kilmarnock Water, Carmel Water, Annick Water, and the Garnock.

=== Changing course ===
Many watercourses have changed direction over the years for various reasons. The Kilmarnock Water used to run slightly to the west as it passes through the Howard Park in Kilmarnock, previously 'Barbadoes Green'; the old 'fossilised' river bank is still discernible. It is said that this was done deliberately by a Lord Boyd, the local laird, so that he could claim more land. The river formed the boundary and by moving it permanently he gained more land.

St. Winnan of Kilwinning is said to have made the River Garnock change its course and follow another "adverse to nature". The river's mistake was to fail to deliver up any fish to one of the saint's angler friends!

The Garnock, Annick and Irvine did not even have the same confluence within recorded history, for Timothy Pont's (1604–08) and Herman Moll's (1745) maps show the Garnock emptying into the sea, about two miles (3.2 km) from the mouth of the Irvine. The Annick did not flow into the Garnock at this time and the Ardeer peninsula was an island. Subsequent to Pont's time, the sea came right up to the town, with vessels loading and unloading at the Seagate, which is now half-a-mile from the sea.

The Earl of Eglinton changed the course of the Lugton Water where it ran through what is now Eglinton Country Park.

Adamson records that a link once existed between the Carmel Water and the Fenwick Water so as to provide more water for the needs of cutlers and tinkers in Kilmaurs. The king allowed the diversion of water that would flow through the 'leg of a boot'.

=== Parish boundaries ===
The parishes that border the river's south bank are Galston, Riccarton, and Dundonald; and on its north side are Loudoun, Kilmarnock, Kilmaurs, Dreghorn and Perceton, and Irvine.

=== Country houses ===
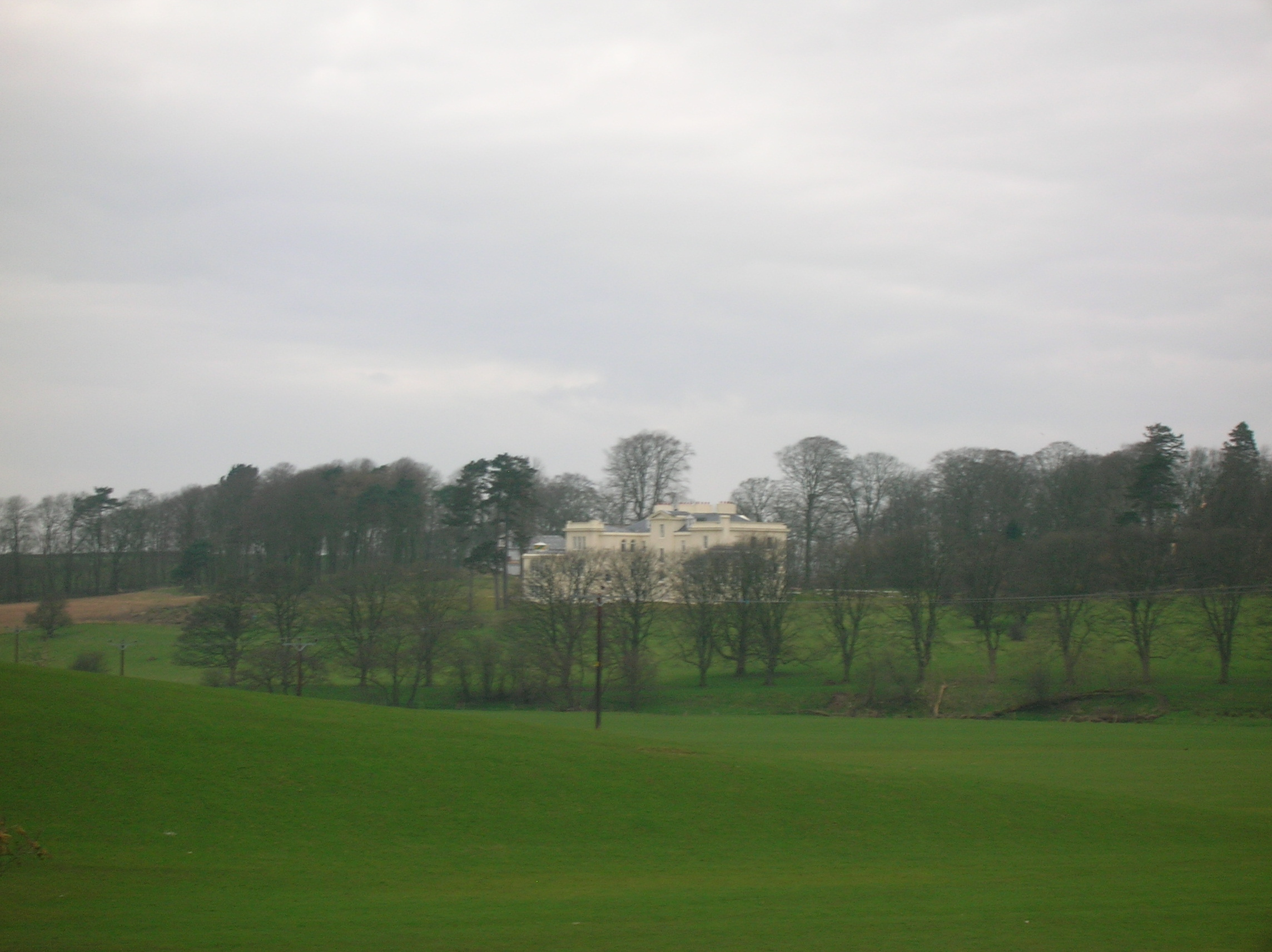
Craig House from Laigh Milton viaduct

The presence of country estates effected the river and its tributaries, often through landscaping and engineering works such as weirs, embankments and minor alterations of its course. The feudal or Victorian estates of Loudoun castle (ruin), Cessnock house, Lanfine house, Holms house (ruin), Kilmarnock house (demolished), Peel house, Caprington, Fairlie house, Craig house (restored 2006), Newfield, Auchans (demolished), and Shewalton (demolished) were all connected with the River Irvine and on the banks of its tributaries are Craufurdland (Craufurdland Water) and Dean castle (Fenwick Water), the two joining to form the Kilmarnock Water; Rowallan, Tour house, Kilmaurs Place, Carmel Bank and Busbie castle (demolished) on the Carmel; Lainshaw (restored 2006), Chapelton (demolished), Annick Lodge, and Bourtreehill (demolished) on the Annick Water; Aiket, Bonshaw (demolished) and Kennox House on the Glazert, and Lambroughton on the Garrier. In the area around Stewarton the valley of the Annick Water was known as 'Strathannick'. Dunlop house and Corsehill castle (ruin) are on the Clerkland Burn and Robertland House is on the Swinzie Burn, both of which flow into the Annick Water.

=== Prehistoric sites ===
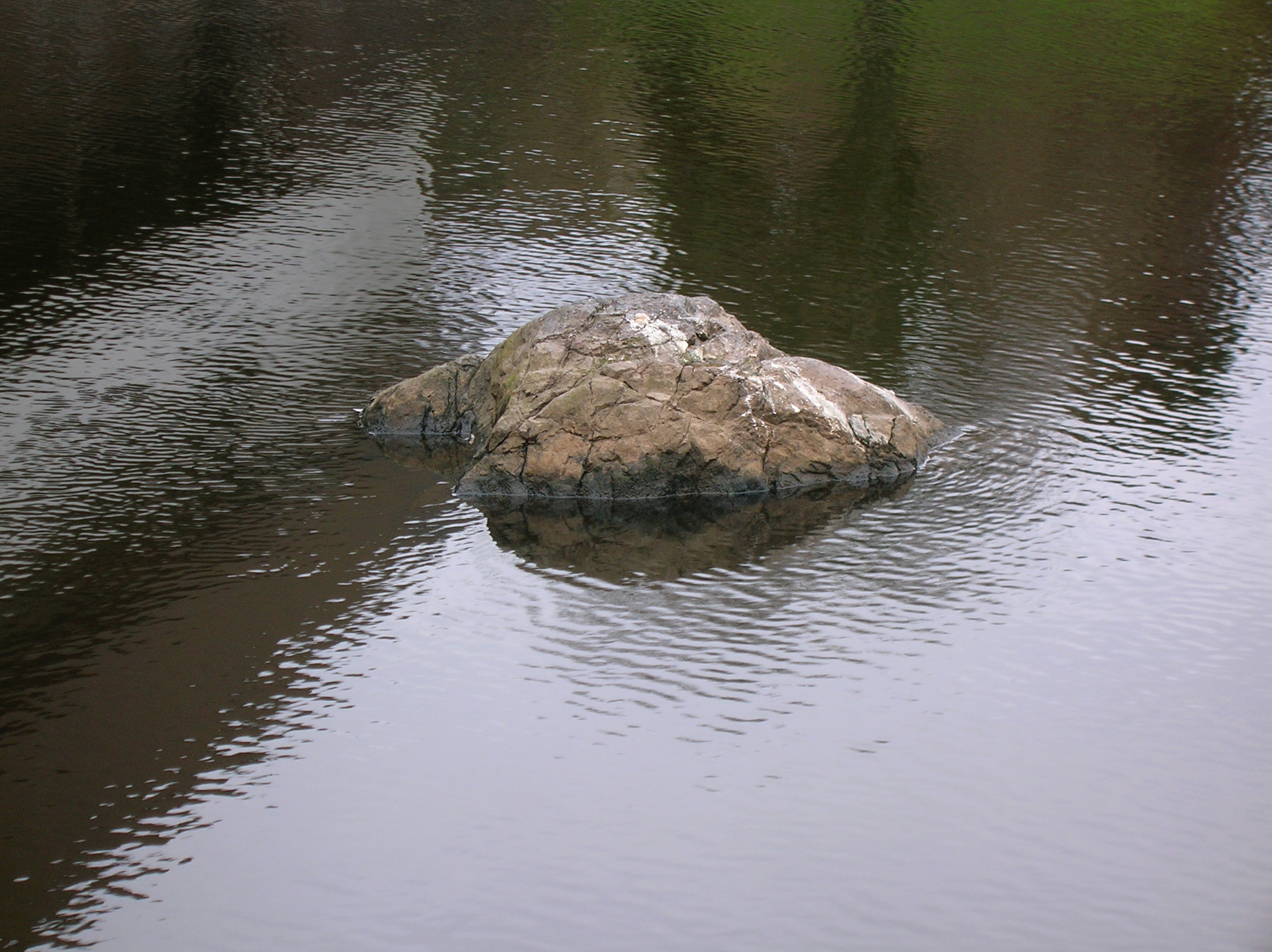
A close up view of the Grannie Stone

A large procumbent boulder known on the OS map as the 'Carlin's Stone' lies next to the Carlin Burn near Craigends Farm below Cameron's Moss in East Ayrshire. A Carl is a commoner, a husband or in a derogatory sense, a churl or male of low birth. More commonly the name Carlin was used as a derogatory term for a woman meaning an 'old hag'. It is also said to be a corruption of the Gaelic word "Cailleach", meaning a witch or the 'old Hag', the Goddess of Winter. This would therefore be the Witch's or Hag's Stone, one of several in Scotland with this name. It has been much visited at one time, with the clear remains of a footbridge running to it across the Hareshawmuir Water.

The Grannie Stane (or Granny Stane) is described as "one of Irvine's prehistoric puzzles", this boulder is either left behind from the Ice Age or is the last remaining stone of a stone circle – others were removed, by blasting, after the Irvine weir was constructed in 1895, but popular protests saved this remaining stone. The Grannie Stane is visible when the water is low. It is unlikely to have gained its name from various similar sounding Roman and Celtic deities.

== The river at work ==
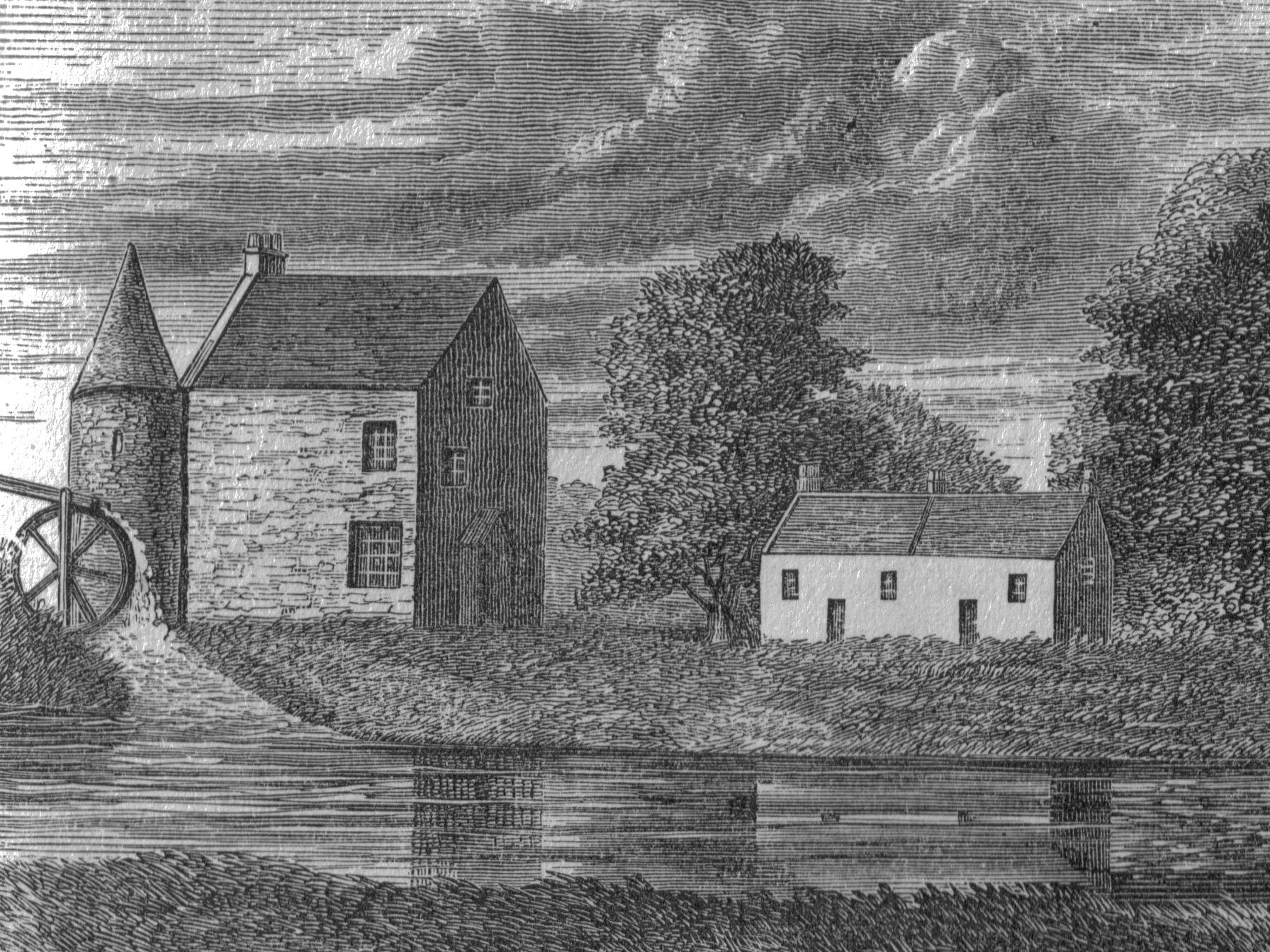
Riccarton Mill in the 1860s.

Many of the weirs, dams and fords on the rivers were built on or developed at natural stone dikes, which already raised the water level at that point.

Etymology
Carmel, the oldest form of which is Caremuall, is thought to be derived, according to McNaught, from the Gaelic 'Car' meaning a 'fort', and 'Meall'. meaning a hill. Therefore, 'The fort on the hill'.

In Kilmarnock in 1880 the Glencairn Mill stood near Riccarton, just before the two bridges, with a long lade running up to join the river near the Glenfield Iron Works; Richardland Brewery sat on the river bank and no doubt used its waters. A slaughter house sat where the Kilmarnock Water joins the Irvine, with an engine works just upstream from it. A Foundry, a forge and an engine works sat beside the Kilmarnock Water at Townholm.

A large number of mills existed along the length of the Annick Water, with only Cunninghamhead Mill still standing today (2006). The Corsehill Mills (corn and wool) were at Stewarton, powered by water from the Corsehill Burn, which arose from the Clerkland Burn. Lambroch Mill was located near Laigh Castleton Farm. Scroaggy or Fairliecrevoch Mill was a waulk mill for preparing cloth and existed until the 1960s, with its lade cutting across the large loop in the river near Ramstane. Downstream from Cunninghamhead was a sawmill and a corn mill existed in Perceton near the old church. Scroag or scrog is a crab apple or gnarled tree stumps in old Scots and this 'nickname' well describes the area where the mill stood. At Galston the Burnanne joins the Irvine. This tributary was famous for its rich jasper pebbles; semi-precious stones, which were collected, cut and polished for use in jewellery. The gravel bed of rivers was an important source of income for millers and others who owned the rights of extraction. The gravel was sold for various farm and horticultural purposes, such as infilling drainage ditches, the surfacing of field entrances and driveways, road surfaces, horticulture, etc.

In 1656 a report to Oliver Cromwell describes the port of Irvine at being "clogged up and almost choked with sand." In 1760 Irvine was the third most important port in Scotland, behind Port-Glasgow and Leith second.

== The river at play ==
The River Irvine and its tributaries have many leisure uses, such as sailing, swimming, fishing, riparian walks, etc. Irvine harbour is now officially closed as a commercial port and now houses a number of privately owned pleasure craft. It is also now home to part of the Scottish Maritime Museum with numerous vessels on display, including the 'Spartan', one of the last surviving Clyde puffers.

Fishing is a very popular pursuit and many angling clubs maintain the river and its banks, monitor fish stocks, report on pollution and carry out conservation measures. Pont in 1604 – 08 writes that salmon are plentiful in the River Irvine. The river contains, amongst others, brown trout, sea trout, salmon, eels, minnows, and sticklebacks.

Rivers have always been used for swimming and one such favourite swimming pool, called the 'Toad Hole' is found near Ramstane on the Annick Water above Cunninghamhead. Many others exist, such as the 'Auld dam' and the 'Munt' on the Corsehill (Clerkland) burn at Stewarton, running into the Annick, which had 'Andra Sweelzies' and the Ladies 'Dookin' Hole.

== Holy waters and mineral springs ==
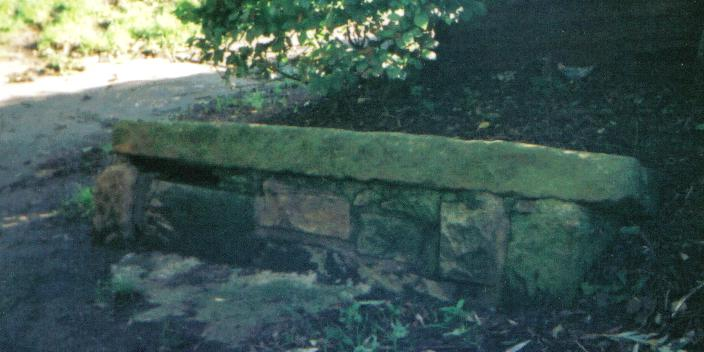
A view of the Monk's or Mack's Well in Kilmaurs.

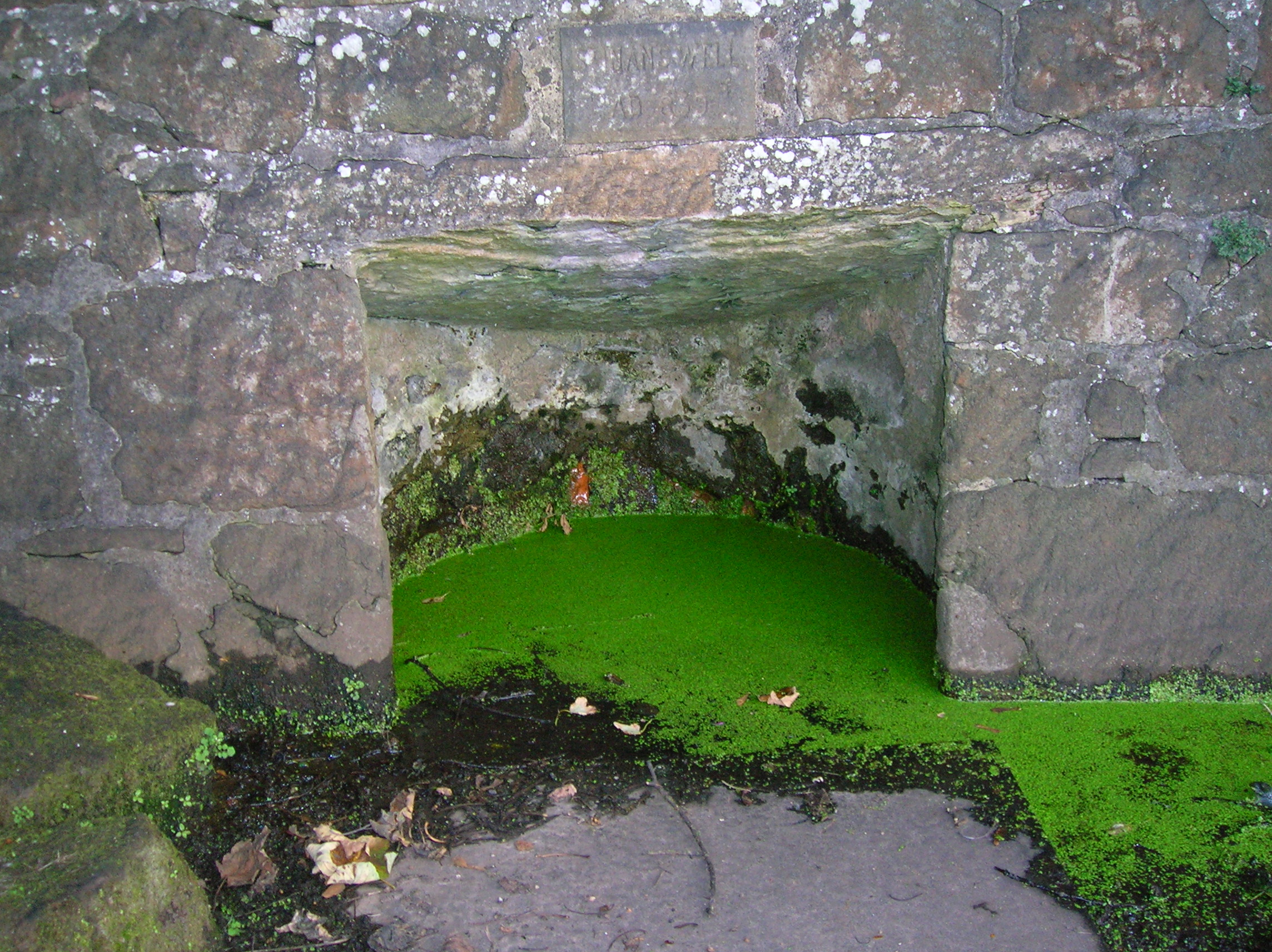
The Chapel Well.

The Burnanne or Burnawn joins the Irvine at Galston. It is named after St Anne, said to be the mother of the Virgin Mary. The St Anne's holy well is marked on the OS and lies above Bank wood, flowing into the Burn Anne. Maria's well lies on the Byrebank burn, in the Loudoun castle policies, which runs down near Loudoun Academy to join the Irvine. A mineral spring is recorded as being near Stewarton, North Ayrshire, called the Bloak Well. Robinson gives the Scot's word 'blout' as meaning the 'eruption of fluid'.

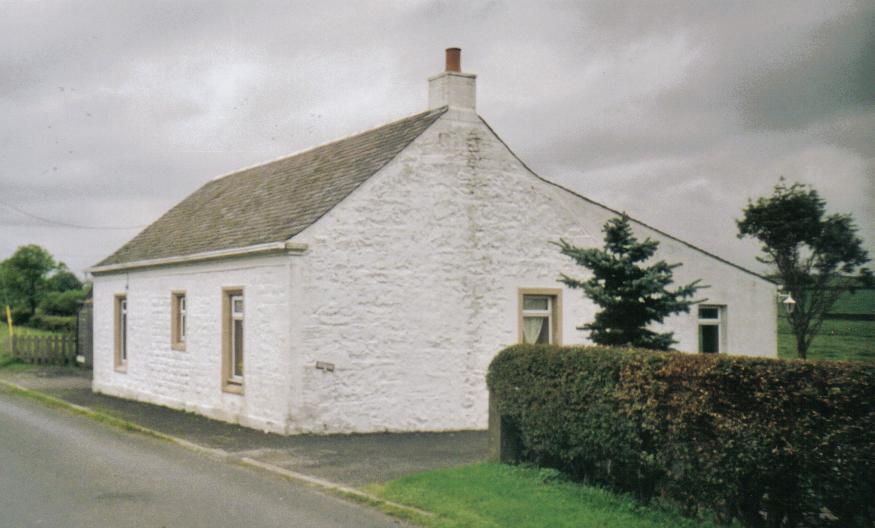
A view of Bloak Well, now called Salt Well in 2006

Bloak Well was first discovered in 1800, 1810, or in around 1826, by the fact that pigeons from neighbouring parishes flocked here to drink. Mr. Cunningham of Lainshaw built a handsome house over the well in 1833 and appointed a keeper to take care of it as the mineral water was of some value. The mineral well waters empty into the Glazert, which joins the Annick Water at Watermeetings near Cunninghamhead.

The Chapel Burn rises near the Anderson Plantation in the fields below Lainshaw Mains and it is marked as a chalybeate or mineral spring on the 1911 6" OS map. Bore holes nearby suggest that the water was put to a more formal use at one time, supplying cattle troughs or possibly even for a stand pipe as mineral water was popular for its supposed curative properties. According to the opinion of the day, it could cure 'the colic, the melancholy, and the vapours; it made the lean fat, the fat lean; it killed flat worms in the belly, loosened the clammy humours of the body, and dried the over-moist brain. The main spring here has been covered over and the water piped out to the burn, which runs down to join the Annick Water at Chapeltoun Bridge.

In the woodland policies of Chapeltoun House is the Monk's Well (OS 1974), fountain or spring as indicated on the OS maps going back as far as 1858. Its present appearance is probably as a Victorian or Edwardian 'whimsy' or 'folly' with a large, thick sandstone 'tombstone appearance' with a slightly damaged cross carved in relief upon it and a spout through which the spring water once passed into a cast iron 'bowl'. It seems unlikely from the workmanship that this stone and cross have anything to do with the old chapel, but one possibility is that it came from over the entrance door to Laigh Chapelton as the custom was for a Templar property to have the 'cross' symbol of the order displayed in such a fashion[2]. On the other hand, it could have been made for the Chapelton (old) House to associate the building with the Christian history of the site. The stone is unusually thick and has been clearly reworked to pass a spout through it. The OS record that in the 1970s a Mr. H. Gollan of Chapeltown stated that the 'Monk's Well', was believed to have been associated with the chapel. In July 1956 the OS state that the 'Monk's Well' is a spring emerging through a stone pipe, situated in a stone-faced cutting in the hill slope, the spring water running into the Annick Water.

The Monk's or Mack's or Maaks Well at Kilmaurs, pronounced 'Manks Well' runs into the Carmel beneath Kilmaurs Place. It is said that many years ago the local laird tried to prevent the local people from using the well. It dried up until the lord changed his mind, but has run continuously ever since. A few deaths have occurred here by drowning or by physical trauma Next to the Kilmaurs-Glencairn church in Kilmaurs is a patch of woodland that was once an orchard. The Tour streamlet joins the Carmel nearby and before the confluence can be found an old well, arched over, known as the Lady's Well, with never-failing, excellent and refreshingly cool water. A small wooden bridge used to run across to the Lady's Well from the church glebe side.

Saint Inans well lies close to the river Irvine on a path running parallel to the Old Irvine Parish churchyard. It bears the date 839 AD (see photograph). A monastic settlement and chapel of Saint Mary at the Thurgartstone near Dunlop's Chapel Crags, is a Christian centre established to eradicate the pagan significance of the site. Monastic cells, a chapel and a graveyard are all now lost to view, originally constructed by the monks of Kilwinning Abbey; only the name 'St. Marys' given to the nearby 'modern' dwellings, built on the site of the chapel record past significance. The Holy Well still exists, the nearby houses pumping water up from its source. The water from the well used to run under the road and emerge in a trough surrounded by a metal fence and then on into the Black Water, which joins the Glazert nearby. Only a concrete manhole indicates this trough now (2006). In 1856 the water for baptism in Dunlop Kirk was still drawn from this Holy Well. St Winnans Well runs into the Garnock at Kilwinning and tradition ascribes healing properties to its holy waters. Dentibert well is on Mid Muir hill on the upper reaches of the Craufurdland water. A Lady's Well is also present near Auchmannoch farm on the upper reaches of the Craufurdland water.

== Waterfalls and weirs ==
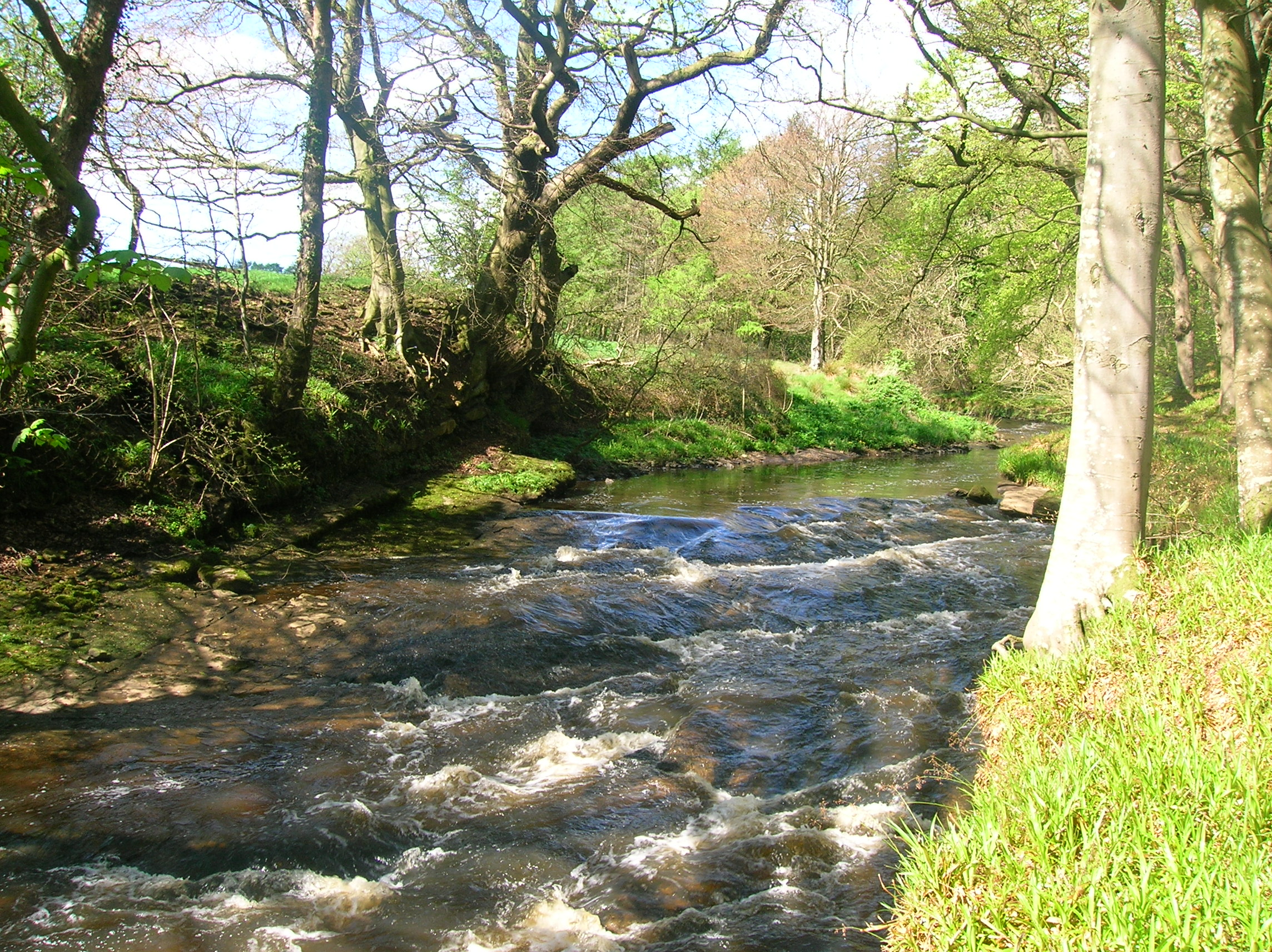
A dike on the Lugton Water near old Montgreenan castle.

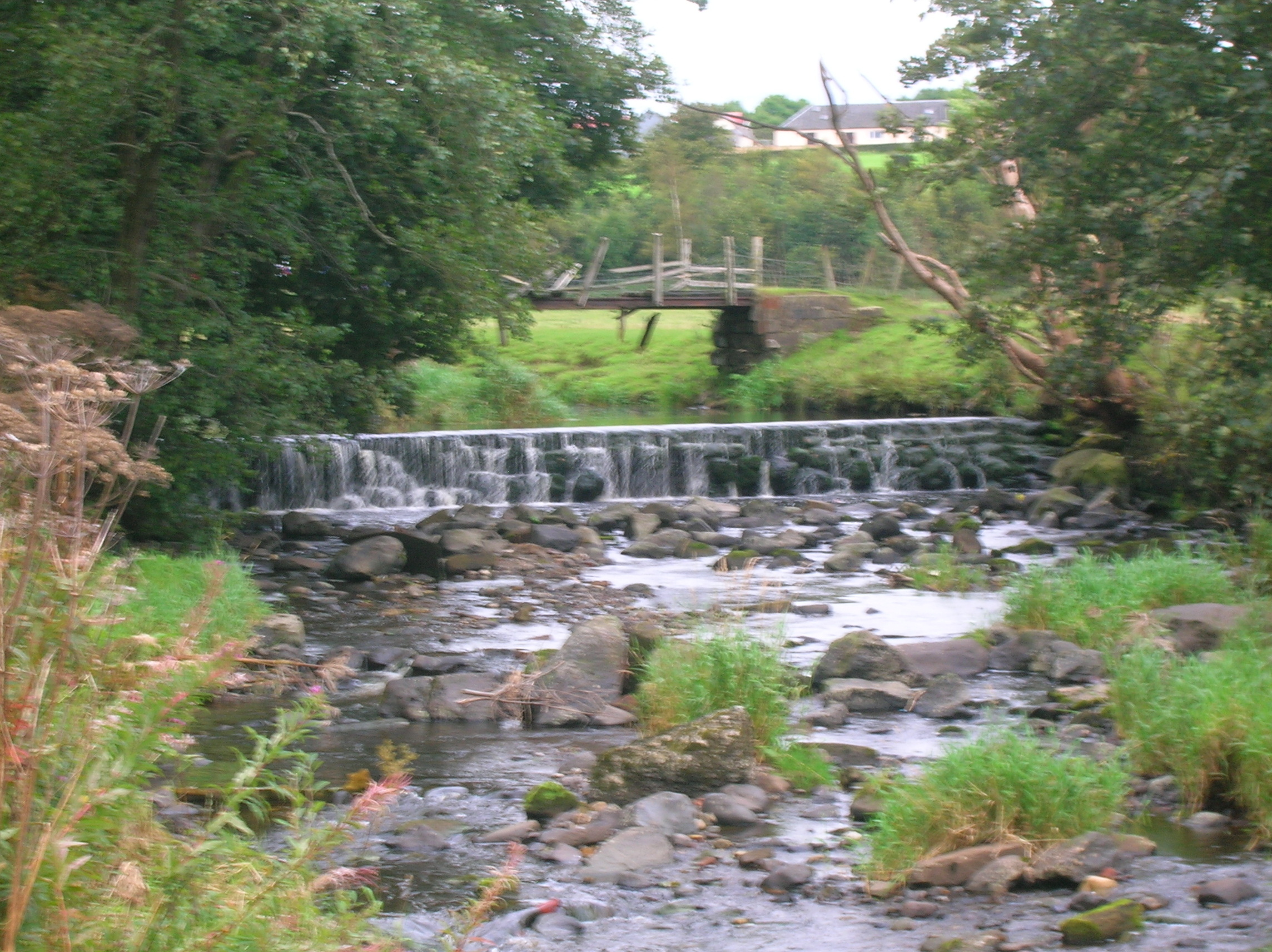
The bridge and weir on the Annick Water below Lainshaw House.

A fair number are present, often on the higher reaches of the rivers. Some are named, such as Lizzie's Linn at Caven Mill, Montgreenan, on the Lugton Water. The Cessnock Water has a number on its course through the woods at the Carnell estate near Fiveways outside Kilmarnock. A series of low waterfalls occur at Cunnighamhead on the Annick Water, these being, like many others, dykes that are more resistant to erosion than the surrounding rocks. Other notable waterfalls are on the Polbaith burn, Fenwick Water (near Rigghill), Glen water (Darvel) and Burn Anne.

Weirs were often built to divert and provide a head of water for the many mills. A more unusual use of a weir was that at Lainshaw House where two weirs, together with a realignment of the Annick Water, provided a large area of water for waterfowl, shooting and ornament.

== Incidents ==
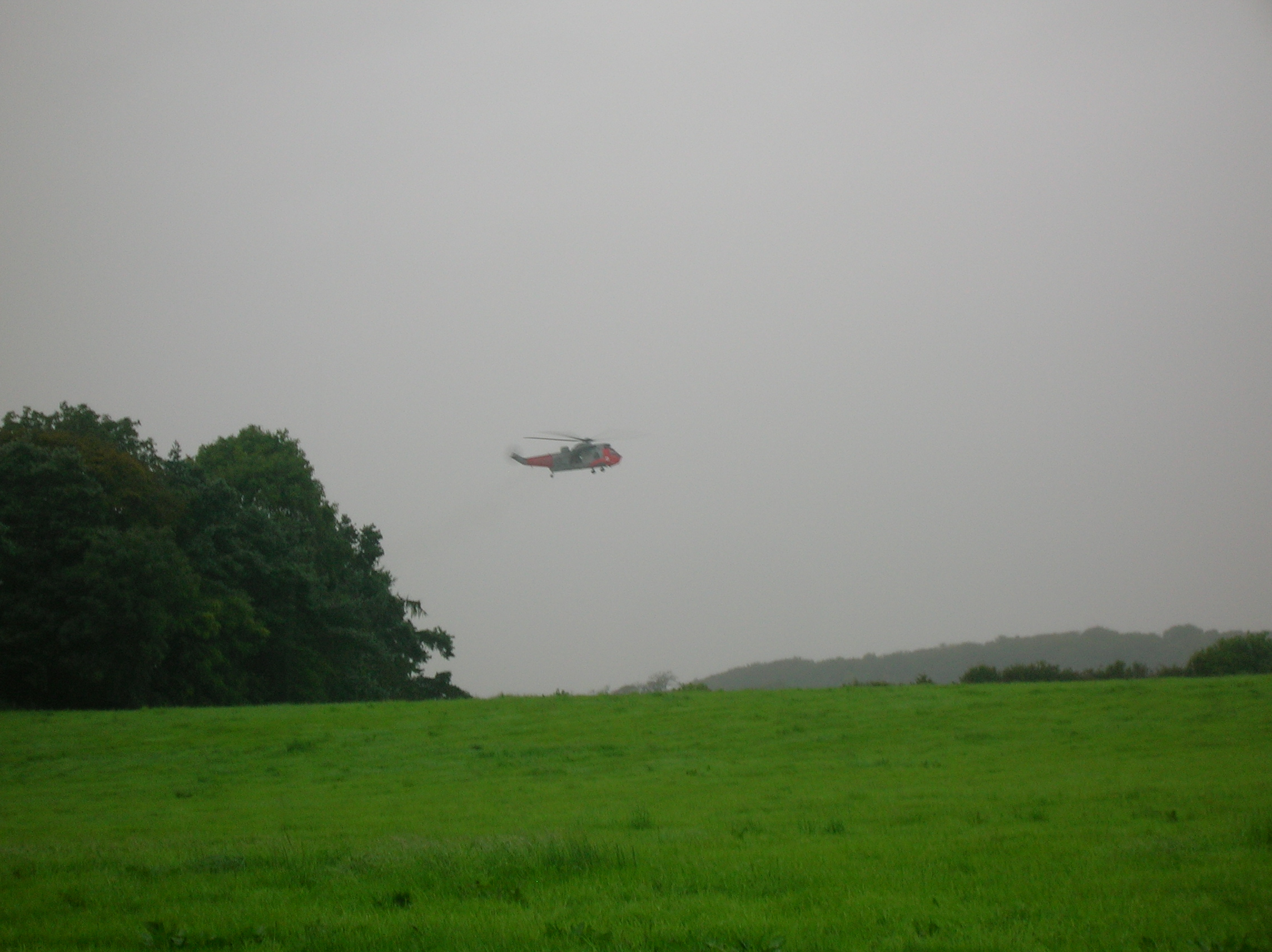
A Royal Navy search and rescue helicopter searching the Annick Water at Lambroughton in 2007.

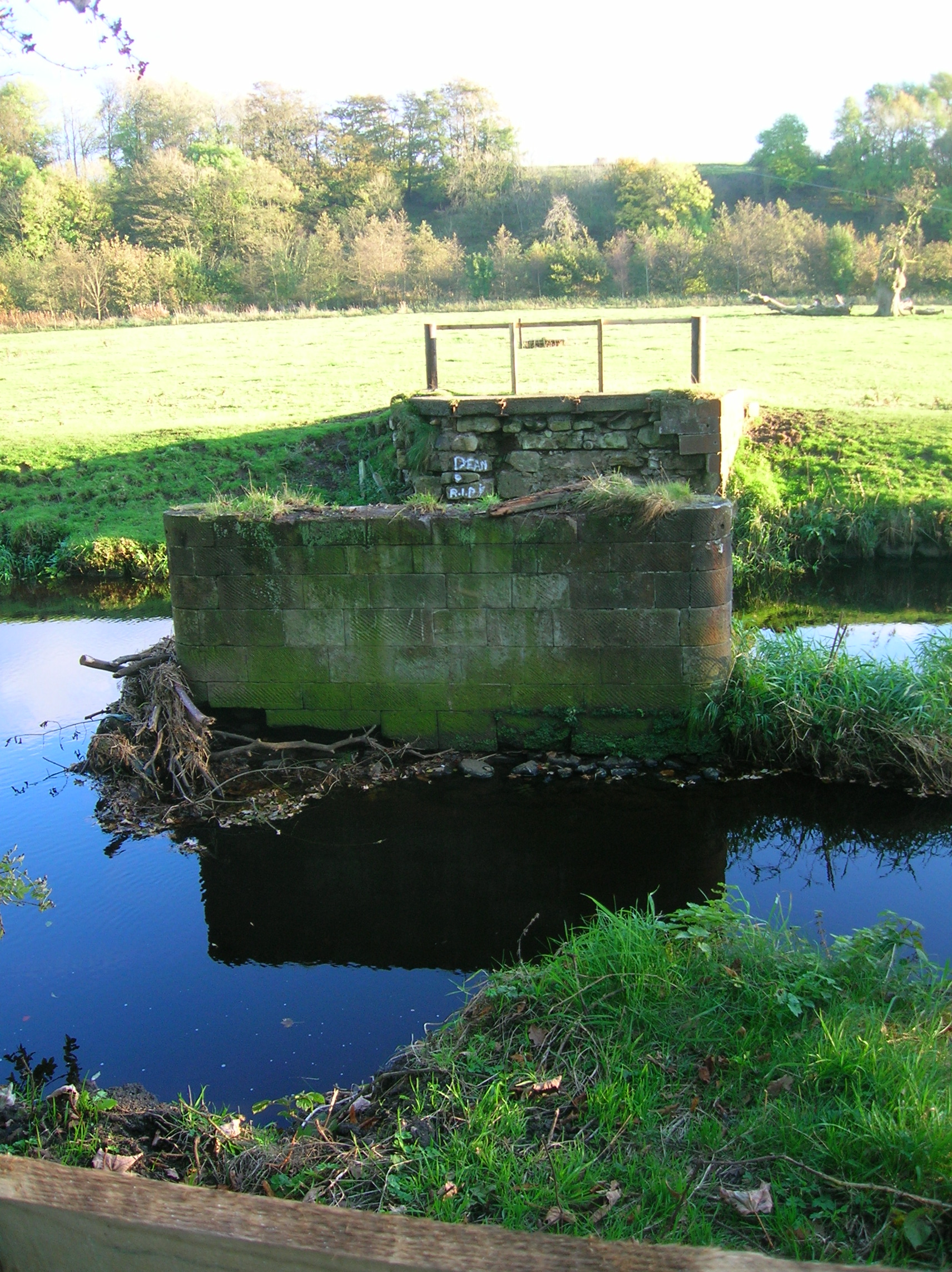
The dismantled bridge at Lainshaw after the drowning in 2007.

Over the centuries the River Irvine and its tributaries have been associated with many violent deaths and accidental drownings, some famous enough to have been recorded and remembered in the folklore of the county. It is recorded that a deep pool in the River Irvine at Irvine was called the 'Witches Plumb' and that it may have been used to duck supposed witches to see if the Devil would save them. This pool lay near the site of the old Gallows Knowe where the old Irvine Royal Academy building was constructed. In the 19th century a Mr. Roxborough, weaver of Galston, after a drinking bout lasting several days, called for his suit one night, saying that the gentleman in black wanted him. Leaving the house with the imaginary man he was later found drowned at the large whinstone rock near the southern termination of the Shawhill Woods at Hurlford by some of Mr John Carse's sons. Margaret Irvine of the nearby old Shaw Farm had something of a reputation as a witch and it was thought appropriate that a man drowned by the Devil should be recovered by one of his adherents. Placed on a cart, the body was taken to Galston, accompanied en route by an unknown man dressed in black!

Maid Morville's mound was located to the left of the bridge over the Irvine at Holmford near Dreghorn. It commemorated the tragic drowning of a female member of this family whilst crossing the Irvine at the old ford. The De Morvilles were the overlords of the Baillie of Cunninghame in feudal times. The mound was destroyed by the earthworks of the new expressway. A 'Maid Morville' street still exists in Dreghorn to commemorate the event. A tombstone in Dreghorn parish churchyard records the tragedy of the drowning in the Annick Water at Perceton of Aurthur Watson, aged two years and eight months on the twelfth of July 1867. His mother was Agnes McAntosh.

In 1843 two young women crossing the pedestrian 'Auld brig (1824)' across the Carmel in Kilmaurs on a stormy night December night carrying a heavy load between them; they missed the way and the one in front was swept away and drowned. On 18 August 2007 a Stewarton boy fell into the Annick Water when it was in flood. The scene of the tragedy was near Lainshaw House. Royal Navy 'Search and Rescue' helicopter from HMS Gannet searched the river for several hours, unsuccessfully. The body was found in the river a few days later near the sewerage works. Craignaught Hill lies in the north-east area of the Parish of Dunlop, with the Clerkland Burn running beneath and on through the grounds of Dunlop House to join the Annick Water at Stewarton. On the slopes of Craignaught Hill was fought a singularly unusual battle between the Boyds of Kilmarnock and the Stewarts of Darnley. Sir Alan Stewart had been treacherously slain by Sir Thomas Boyd, and his son, Alexander Stewart, was determined to take revenge. Sir Thomas was surprised on the night of 9 July 1439, whilst riding past Craignaught on his way north and although outnumbered, he and his followers fought on, even taking agreed rest periods indicated by the sounding of a horn. Eventually and inevitably Sir Thomas was killed, stabbed in the back by a Stewart, and a large number of his followers were also killed.

The result of this encounter led to killings and counter killings that involved a great part of the West of Scotland. Boyd's wife had dreamed all that came to pass, and died of grief within days of her husband death. The 1860 OS marks 'Boyd's Hill' and 'Boyd's slack' (Scots for a narrow pass) to the north of Craignaught on the old lane to Grange Farm, now named South Grange. Boyd's Hill has been undamaged (2007) by the quarrying and domestic waste disposal operations and the Boyd's slack is also clearly identifiable.

A little below the watermeetings of the Irvine and the Kilmarnock Water took place a pivotal incident in 1297, which led to the Scottish Nation regaining its independence following what was effectively its conquest by Edward I of England. Sir William Wallace was fishing on the Irvine when a troop of English soldiers dismounted and demanded that he give up his catch. He offered to share, but this was refused and he was grossly insulted by the soldiers for his temerity. He had no weapons, however he used his fishing rod to disarm one soldier and then killed him with his own sword. He similarly dispatched two others and the remaining soldiers then fled. He went to his uncle's castle, the nearby Riccarton Castle, and in the following months an uprising slowly gained impetus through the example of one unarmed Scotsman killing three armed soldiers. A thorn tree called the "Bickering Bush" stood nearby and a public house by that name existed in Kilmarnock until it was demolished prior to the construction of the A71 Irvine flyover across the A77 Ayr Road on the site.

From The Actes and Deidis of the Illustre and Vallyeant Campioun Schir William Wallace, a poem by Blind Harry.

Three slew he there, two fled with all their might, unto their horse in a confounded fright;

Left all their fish, no longer durst remain, and three fat English bucks upon the plain;

Thus in a great hurry, having got their cuffs, they scampered off in haste to save their buffs.

On the upper reaches of the Irvine at Loudoun Hill, Wallace intercepted a convoy and routed those accompanying the English supplies. An earthwork at Loudoun Hill is still known as "Wallace's Knowe." On 10 May 1307 Aymer de Valence, King Edward's commander, fought Robert the Bruce at Loudoun Hill, who was protected on either side by peat mosses, impassable by heavy cavalry. The English bowmen opened the battle, but the Scots troops had dug trenches and were relatively unharmed. The English cavalry were panicked by the pikes of the Scots and a slaughter of the English soldiers developed ending in complete victory for the Bruce's Scots army. At the Nether Ford on the Irvine near Riccarton, Robert the Bruce in 1307 sent Sir James Douglas to intercept the English soldiers commanded by Sir Philip de Mowbray. The English were ambushed as they crossed the ford on the Irvine and sixty lay dead before the panic-stricken survivors fled in panic.

The Hagg burn joins the Irvine just before the town of Galston, having run past the old ruined castle of Achruglen or Arcklowdun, near Loudoun Castle. Achruglen tower, now a ruin, was the site of the burning to death of two Campbells, the Countess of Loudoun and her son and heir, by the Kennedys of Bargany in the 16th century.

Timothy Pont c. 1606 states that "not far from Kilmarnock, in ye midell of ye river Iruin, was the Read Steuart slaine, after he had receaved a Responce from a vitch yat he should not perrish nather in Kyle or zet in Cuninghame, the said river being the merch betwixt the two, and being in nather of them." This Red Stewart was Sir John Stewart of Dundonald, a natural son of Robert II of Scotland, a monarch who had spent much time at Dundonald Castle. Another source spoils the story by giving Dumbarton as the place of the Red Stuart's death.

Etymology
The Garrier's name is thought to be derived, according to McNaught, from the Gaelic 'ruigh or righ' meaning 'fast running water' The Scots word 'Gaw' is also the term given to a 'cut made by a plough' or a furrow or channel made to draw off water.

In April 1586, Hugh, 4th. Earl of Eglinton was travelling to Stirling to join the royal court having been commanded to attend by the King. He was accompanied only by a few domestic servants and being in no great hurry he stopped at Lainshaw Castle to dine with his close relative, a Montgomerie who was Lord of Lainshaw and whose Lady was a Margaret Cunninghame of Aiket Castle, with sisters married to John Cunninghame of Corsehill and David Cunninghame of Robertland. It seems that a plot to kill the Earl as an act of revenge had been organised and the Lady, or some say a servant girl who was also a Cunninghame, climbed to the battlements after the meal to hang out a white table napkin and thereby spring the plot. Thirty Cunninghames attacked the Earl at the Annick ford and cut his servants to pieces with swords and other weapons, the Earl himself being finally dispatched with a single shot from the pistol of John Cuninghame of Clonbeith Castle. His horse carried his dead body along the side of the river, still known in Stewarton as the 'Weeping', 'Mourning' or 'Widows' path. A wave of bloody revenge swept over Cunninghame and elsewhere, with Cunninghame friends, relatives and adherents killed without restraint.

Following a conventicle (an illegal religious meeting of Covenanters) on the lands of Harelaw, in the Parish of Loudoun, on 1 June 1679, the worshippers were warned of the approach of John Graham of Claverhouse and the King's troops. The battle itself took place in Avondale near Drumclog. The Laird of Torfoot graphically described the scene of bloody hand-to-hand fighting with no 'quarter' given. At the end of the day the Covenanters, commanded by Robert Hamilton, were victorious. Following the Battle of Drumclog, the defeated Claverhouse and his remaining troops escaped to Glasgow to fight another day, leaving 36 dead on the battlefield.

According to tradition, the Puddleford in Irvine, was the site of a skirmish between Wallace and the English – there is no evidence that Wallace was present, but the tradition gained credibility when repeated as fact in the 1920s. In 1826, a severe drought forced farmers to collect water from the Monk's Well in Kilmaurs, a spring never known to be dry. They drove their carts along the dry bed of the Carmel to catch the water, which poured from an exit high up on the wall. One of these farmers horses bolted, bringing the head of a female rider into violent contact with the arch of the 'Auld Brig', killing the unfortunate woman outright.

== Crossing the river ==
Etymology
The name Annick, previously Annock, Annoch (1791) or Annack Water, possibly derives from the Gaelic abhuin, meaning water and oc or aig meaning little or small.

It is recorded that stilts were sometimes used to cross the river, for example Thomas Raeburn of Holmhead near Hurlford worked as a gardener at Shawhill House and regularly crossed the River Irvine using stilts. At nearby Barleith, Mayday festivities sometimes included stilt races across and back, resulting in much amusement as many competitors fell into the water. Rivers form physical boundaries and are only crossed with either trouble or expense. At the port of Irvine itself ferry boats took passengers across to Ardeer, further upstream fords and /or stepping stones were present in many places. These were often treacherous and could turn from tranquil to lethal in a matter of minutes, often with no warning as the rainfall could well have fallen far upstream or at the moors that form the watershed.

At one time people were carried across rivers, usually at fords, but not necessarily. A fee would normally be charged or it might be part of the 'job description' of a servant. One Ayrshire story tells of a rich farmer who employed a servant girl to carry him across the river on his way to church each Sunday. As time went by he became very fond of the servant and eventually they married. She willingly carried him across on the way to their wedding, but she refused on the way back and never carried him again. The Kilmarnock Standard newspaper recorded in 2011 that a leisure boat service had been set up in the 1930s, running from a short concrete jetty, however it was not a success and did not continue for long.

Many sets of stepping stones are recorded on OS maps, such as at Shawhill Farm near Hurlford, crossing over to Templetonburn and Skerrinngton Mains nearby. Stepping stones are marked on the 1897 OS map as being located just downstream from the present Chapeltoun bridge over the Annick Water and further upstream near Townhead of Lambroughton. The then owner of Chapeltoun Mains had the Chapeltoun stepping stone sremoved in the 20th century. Stepping stones are shown near Waterside Farm on the Irvine at Galston. Stepping stones and a ford existed at Kaimshill House near Crookedholme in the 1870s; called 'Struthers Steps' they crossed the river Irvine below Struther's Farm, home to James Paterson. The Kilmarnock Glenfield Ramblers in 1931 remark on the stepping stones at Struthers having long since disappeared and that stepping stones at Haining on the Cessnock Water still survived.

An interesting possible origin of the name of the Puddle ford at Irvine is 'holy steps' ('pas de Dieu'), referring to the stepping stones the Carmelite Priory monks made their way across on their way to Church. Some of the stepping stones may have come from the stone circle, later removed, of which the Grannie stone is the last survivor. Use of the Puddleford by horses was prohibited in 1836 to safeguard access to the Puddly Well, one of the public wells all of which were repaired at about that time.

=== Fords ===
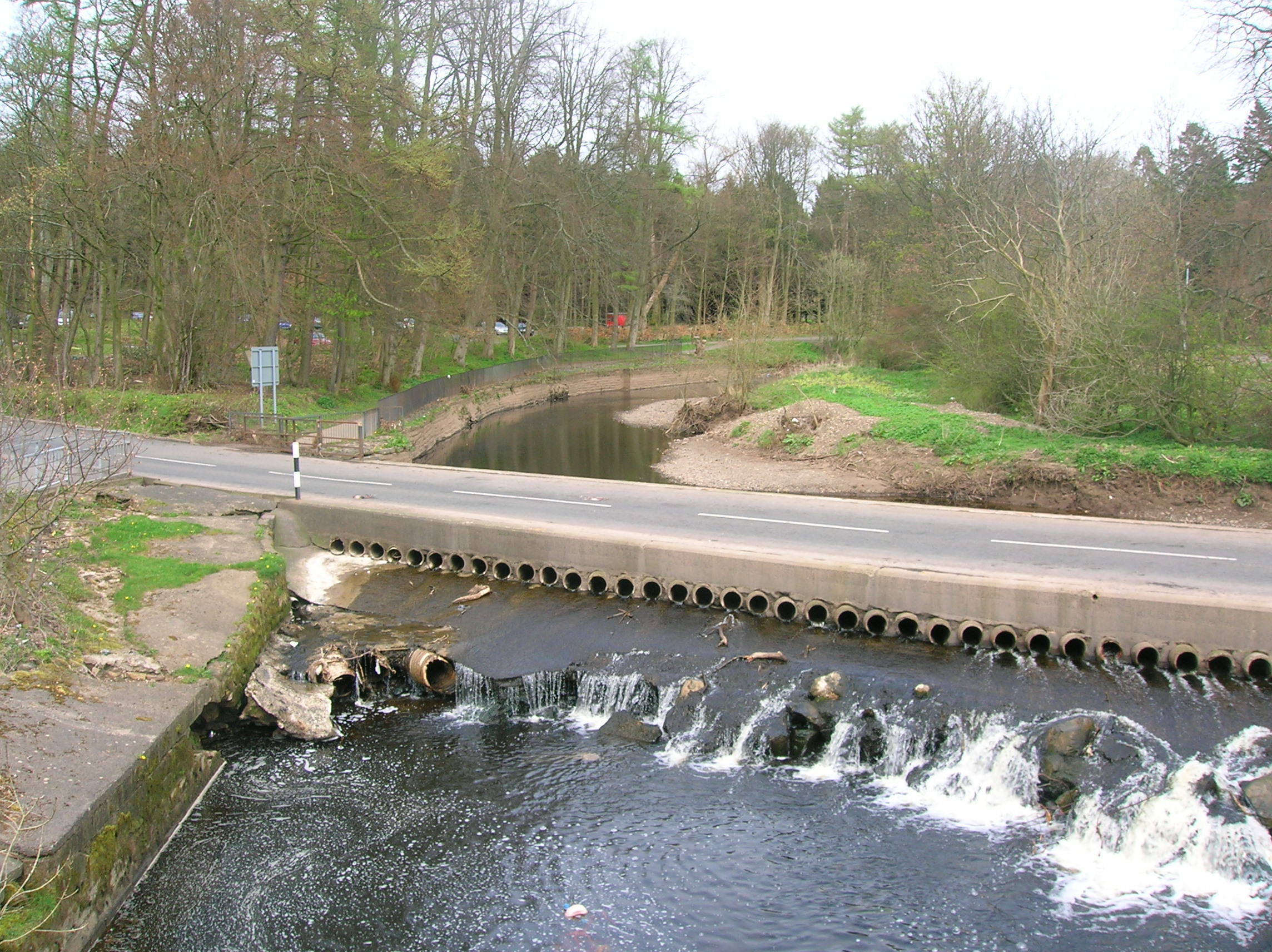
The Dean Ford over the Kilmarnock Water in Kilmarnock. 2007.

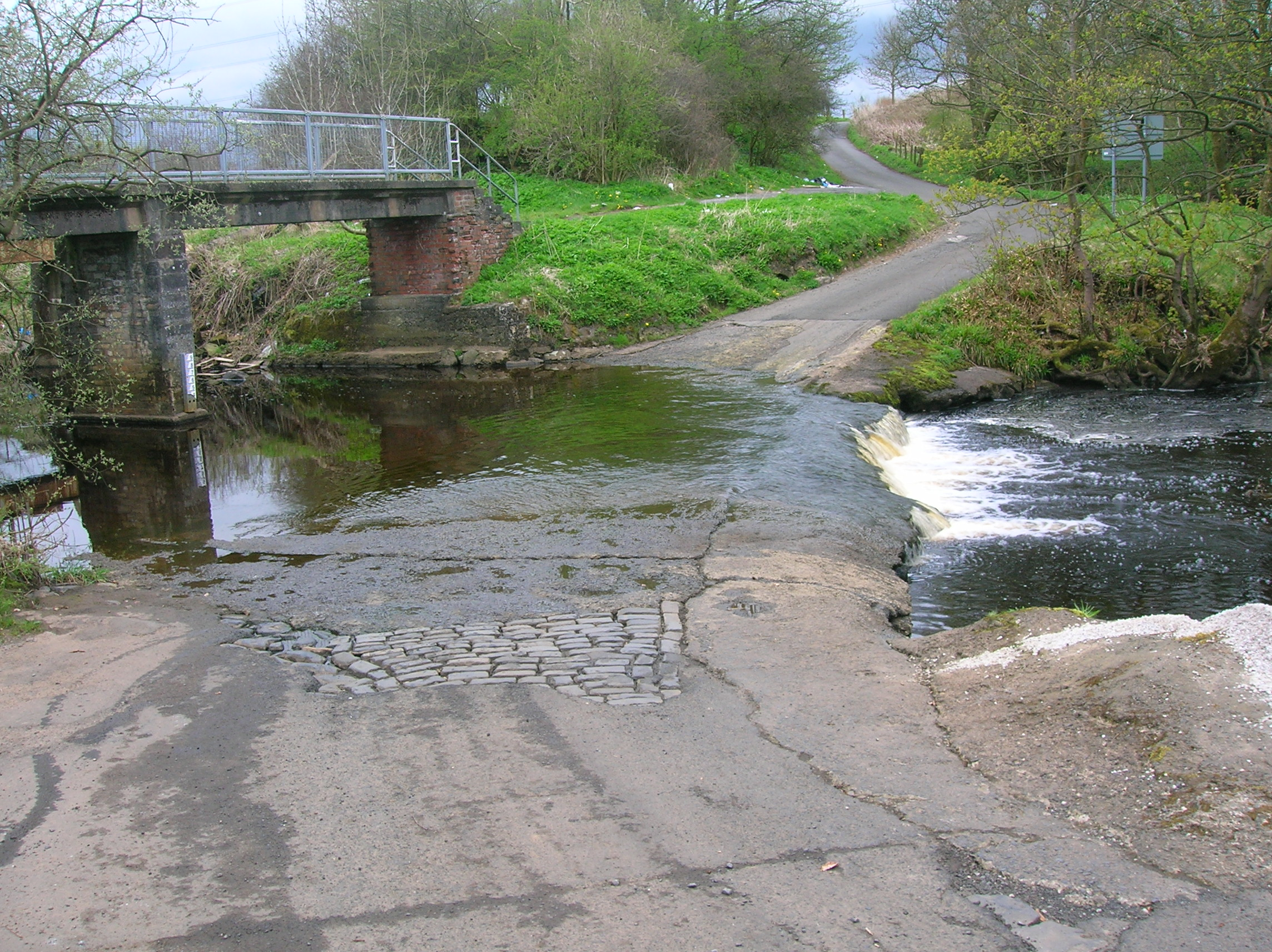
The Bringan Ford on the Fenwick Water.

The toll road authorities found fords something of a nuisance as passage was free unlike the bridge where a toll was levied. To prevent this they often obtained authority to deepen the fords in the river to force the use of bridges on the toll roads; very few fords therefore remain in Ayrshire. Even the Dean Ford has ceased to exist on the Kilmarnock Water after resolution of difficulties to do with the legal transfer of the property to the council by Lord Howard de Walden and the legal definition of the boundaries of the lands gifted. Further up the Fenwick Water the Bringan Ford still survives. Many of the fords eventually developed wooden footbridges alongside, such as at the Bringan Ford and as at Knockentiber in 1860 on the old Kilmarnock Road ford. The fine 'suspension bridge' footbridge at the Dean Ford was famous for collapsing with the weight of sightseers on its opening day. It was replaced with a stronger structure but has been removed due to the ford being bridged over circa 2016.

A 'Romford', 'Rameford', 'Room' or 'Rome Ford' was situated where the modern road bridge crosses the Irvine at Gatehead. In Scots 'Rommle' is to rumble or stir violently, a more likely explanation than some memory of the Roman occupation of Scotland. Another suggestion is that 'Room' or 'Rome' meant a small farm. Adamson states that this bridge was built in around 1870, replacing an older bridge.

The Hurling Ford existed at Shewalton where it crossed the river to the Warrix Holm (see video).

=== Pedestrian and road bridges ===
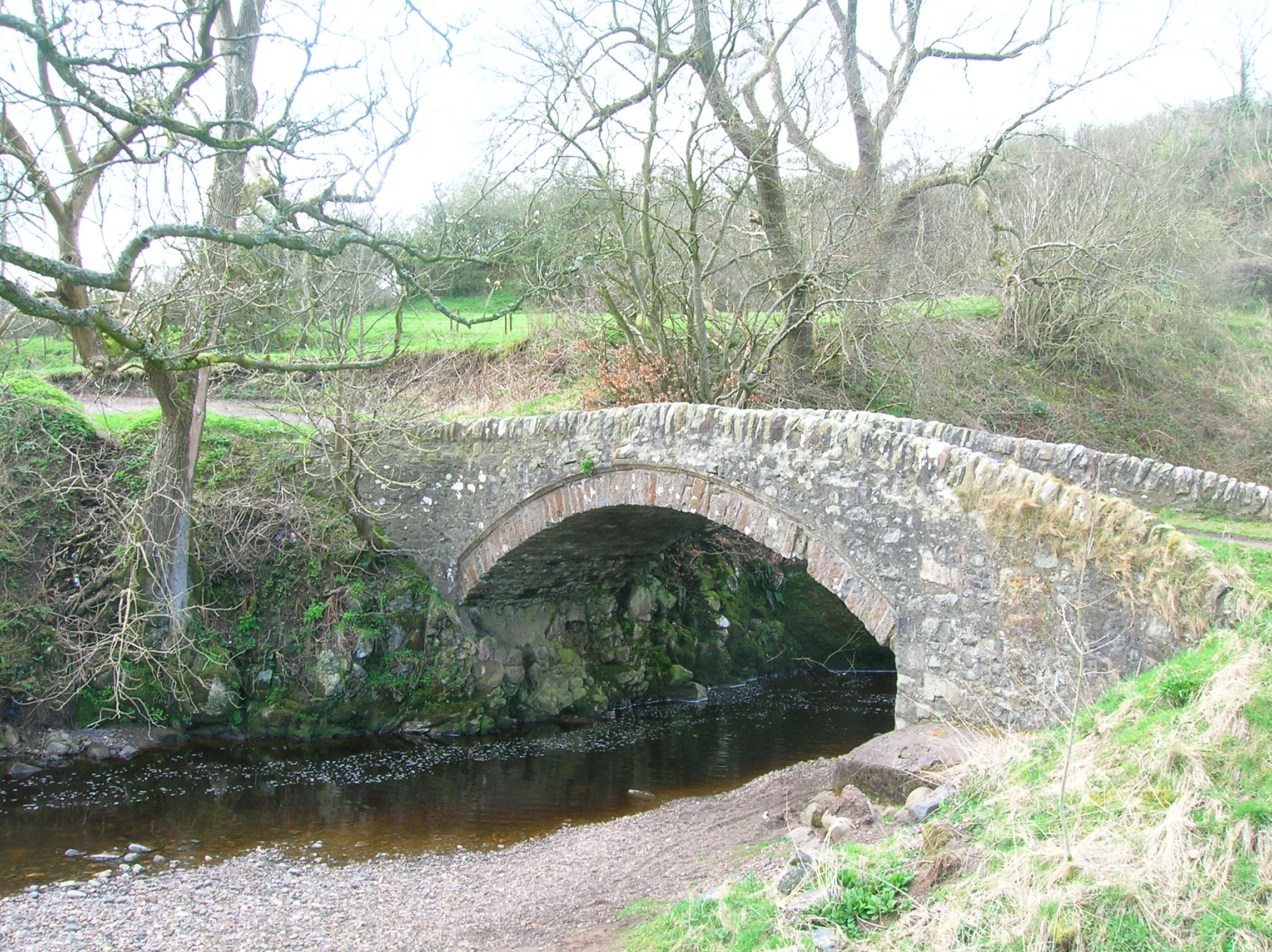
The Law Bridge over the Glen Water near Darvel. 2007.

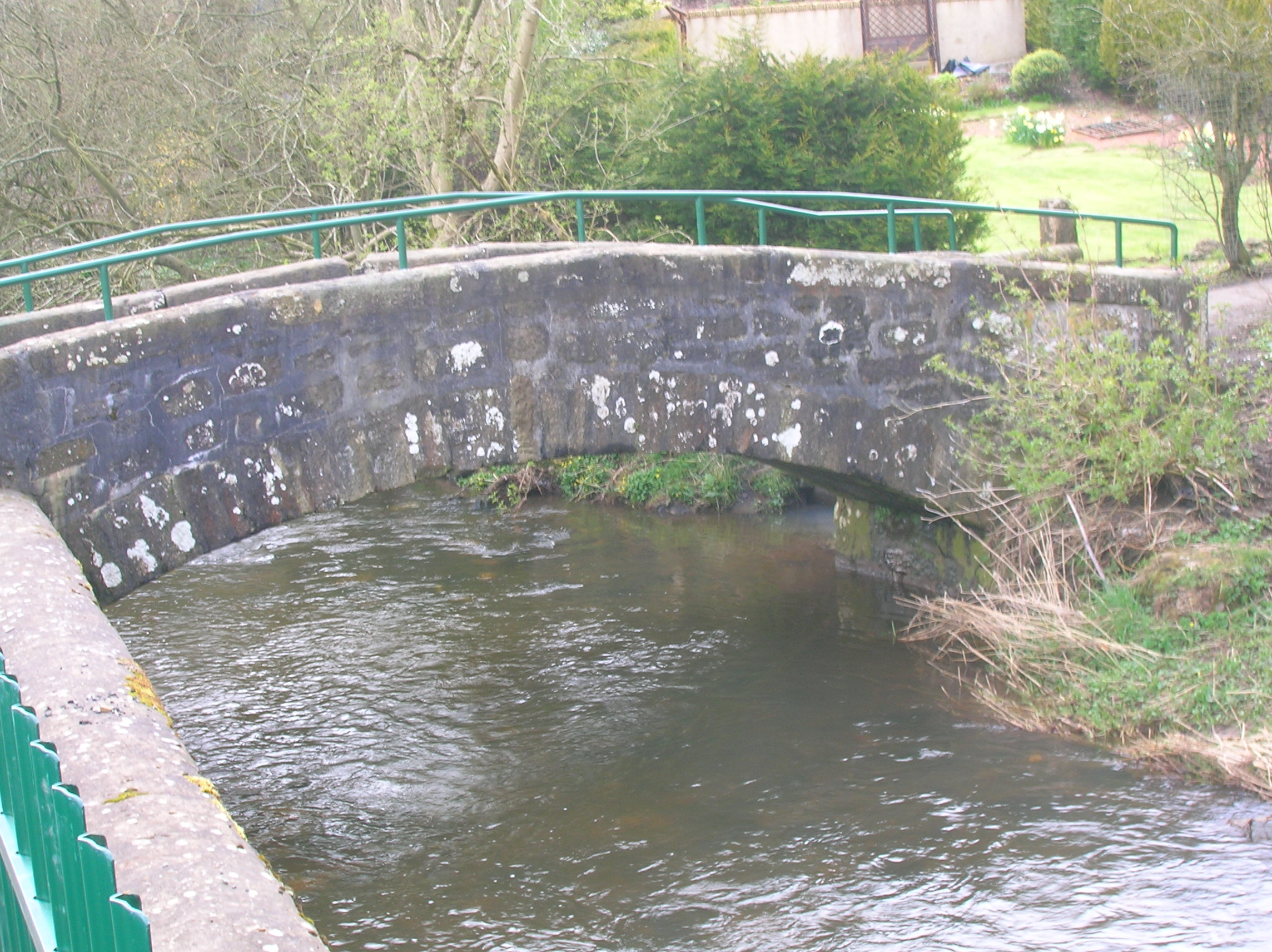
The Old Brig over the Carmel Water in the park below Kilmaurs Place.

Bridges were built where they could be afforded or where they were most needed. Many of the older bridges were built by local lairds, such as Chapeltoun Bridge over the Annick Water, which was built in the 1850s to replace a ford downstream at Bankend, opposite West Lambroughton. Archibald Adamson on his Rambles Round Kilmarnock in 1875 records that the Irvine is the Parish boundary between Kilmarnock and Riccarton and that the ancient bridge running into Riccarton bears the date 1726. Aiton states that the stones used to build this bridge were conveyed in the first wheeled carts used in Ayrshire, sledges having been employed on the poor quality roads that existed prior to this time. The new brisge was built here about 1845.

The pedestrian 'Auld Brig' across the Carmel water in Kilmaurs was built to replace stepping stones in 1824. It has been the scene of two deaths. Both Beattie and the Kilmarnock Glenfield Ramblers refer to Murdock's or Murdoch's iron bridge over the Carmel Water near Kilmaurs-Glencairn church as being the oldest iron bridge in Scotland. It was erected following a 1d subscription from each of the house-houlders of Ayrshire. The council demolished it in around the year 2000 and replaced it with a wooden bridge. The bridge over the Craufurdland Water at Craufurdland was built by Mr. Craufurdland, using the balusters from the original part of the battlements of Cessnock Castle, which had originally been given to Captain Whyte of The Cottage.

A bridge at Haining in 1931 went over the Cessnock. It was made from two wires stretched, one above the other, across the water. The one-man-at-a-time bridge was traversed by the passager holding the top wire and placing their feet on the lower wire.

=== Railway bridges ===
Railways appeared very early in this part of Scotland and one of the first built was the stone viaduct over the Irvine at Laigh Milton, part of the Kilmarnock and Troon Railway. It has four arches, and although not used since 1846, it was restored in 1996. The railway carried steam locomotives 9 years before the Stockton and Darlington Railway and is believed to be the first passenger steam railway in the world. The viaduct itself, built in 1811, is the oldest surviving railway viaduct in Scotland. and one of the oldest in the world:

Many of the railways that crossed the river were mineral lines, which often had an intensive but short life, such as the 1923 OS mineral lines that ran to collieries near Earlston, Nether Craig and Cockhill farm (Fairlie (Pit No.3)). The 1860 OS names the 'Fairlie Branch' and indicates its operation by the Glasgow and South Western Railway company. The bridges built for these lines are still clearly visible.

== Taming the river ==
Flood prevention schemes have canalised the Kilmarnock (previously the Marnock) Water where it runs down through Kilmarnock towards the Irvine, with significantly raised banks and automatically closing gates. The Irvine has likewise been tamed with a large flood prevention scheme at east Holmes Wetlands near Galston. Here the river is directed into its old floodplains when the water rises above a certain height, thereby protecting Kilmarnock. A scheme on the River Cessnock is underway (2007). Many sections of the other rivers have been canalised and / or have bunds on either bank to prevent the watercourses flooding into their flood plains.

== Wildlife ==
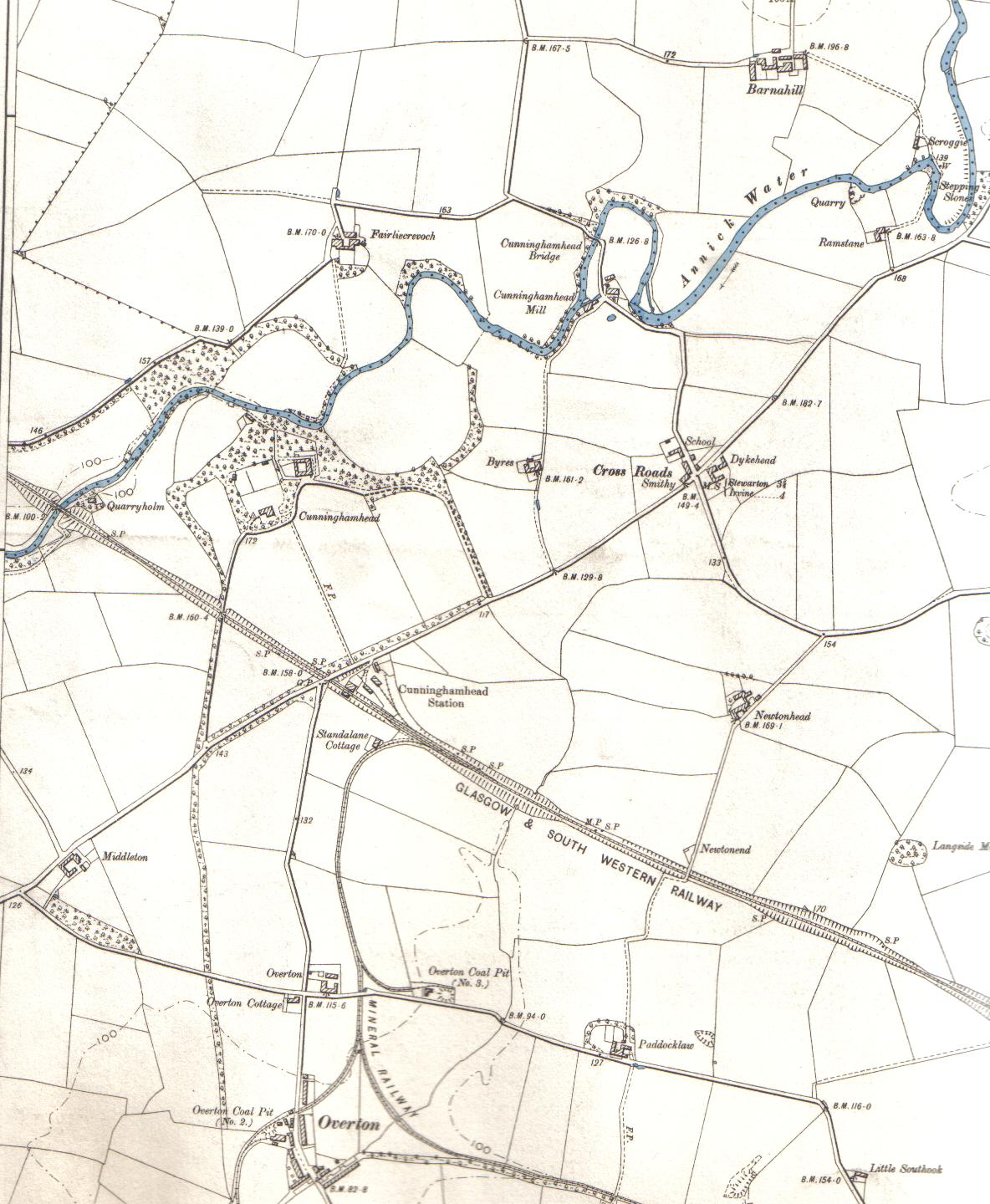
A map of part of the course of the Annick Water in 1897, showing Cunninghamhead Mill and bridge.

=== Meadow plants ===
Many of the water meadows are rich in pignut (Conopodium majus), a relative of parsley, which formed a breaktime snack for children in former times. The plant is dug up to harvest a small potato-like structure that, eaten raw, has a slightly nutty taste. It is available commercially for salads, etc. Hemlock water dropwort grows well in the wetter areas and is best left alone as the name hemlock suggests. The large leaves of the butterbur (Petasites hybridus) are found in several areas; its name harkens back to the days before clingfilm or cheap paper when the leaves were used to wrap butter destined for the market. Water ragwort (or Saracen's ragwort) (a species of Senecio) is an introduced plant that grows along the Garnock in tall stands. Although it is common on the Garnock and at present quite rare elsewhere. Himalayan balsam or policemen's helmets is another introduction, but a common one. Giant hogweed is beginning to make its presence felt. It is another plant that should never be handled, as the sap can cause severe blistering and scarring of the skin.

The Stewarton Flower or pink purslane (Claytonia sibirica) is common in wetter areas. It has white or pink flowers at this site, but closer to Stewarton it is almost always white. It seems that it was first introduced as a white variety in the Stewarton area in Victorian times and the common pink variety, introduced later, spread to other areas. Dalgarven, it seems, is on the edge of the white flower zone of dominance. Coppicing of the riverside alder trees is still carried out, often unintentionally by the anglers. Alders grow well in wet soils and are specially adapted for the low nutrient conditions through having large root nodules containing nitrogen-fixing bacteria that enrich the soil in the same way as clover plants and other legumes. The trees in the vicinity of the rivers were not planted by farmers for 'visual effect', they were crops and the wood was used for building and fencing; The millers needed beech or hornbeam wood for mill machinery, in particular the cogs on the drive wheels from the waterwheel.

It is not generally appreciated how much the Ayrshire landscape has changed its character over the last few hundred years, for even in the 1760–70 Statistical Account it is stated that "there was no such thing to be seen as trees or hedges in the parish; all was naked and open."

=== Birds, fish and other animals ===
The river and its banks, support, amongst others, Kingfishers, tawny and barn owls, herons, moorhean, coot, mallard, ravens, rooks, treecreepers, buzzards, peewits or lapwings, roe deer, mink, moles, shrews, grey squirrels, hares, hedgehogs, foxes, badgers, pipistrelle bats and otters. Migrating Canada and Graylag Geese frequent the nearby fields on their way up from the Solway Firth / Caerlaverock area or coming down from Spitzbergen in the winter.

Etymology
The name 'Glazert' may come from the Celtic, glas in Gaelic meaning grey or green and dur meaning water.

The river's water quality is generally quite good nowadays, proven by the presence of freshwater limpets and shrimps, together with leeches, caddis fly larvae and water snail species. Pont in 1604 – 08 writes that salmon are plentiful in the River Irvine. The river system contains, amongst others, brown trout, sea trout, salmon, eels, minnows, lampreys, and sticklebacks. The brown colour of the Irvine at places like Darvel and Newmilns is not a result of pollution, but simply organic material washed out of the peat banks at the watershed. Freshwater mussels, a species persecuted for its pearls, are found in places on the Glazert and the Garnock.

== Micro history ==
Pont in 1604–08 records that so thickly was the district about Stewarton and along the banks of the Irvine populated for a space of three or four miles "that well travelled men in divers parts of Europe (affirm) that they have seen walled cities not so well or near planted with houses so near each other as they are here, wherethrough it is so populous that, at the ringing of a bell in the night for a few hours, there have seen convene 3000 able men, well-horsed and armed."

Shewalton Sand Pits is a Scottish Wildlife Trust nature reserve on the River Irvine near Irvine. Immense labour has been expended over the years in retaining building walls on either side of many of the rivers and burns. At Chapeltoun on the Annick Water even the Chapel Burn bed is 'cobbled'. This drystone walling was important in reducing the erosion of the river banks. The Brackenburn near Kilmaurs has been misnamed as the Garrier by the Ordnance Survey since the 1860s. When burns or rivers join it is usually the largest that decides the name of the river downstream, unless the name changes completely, such as the Kilmarnock Water forming from the Fenwick and Craufurdland Waters. Occasionally a water course is reduced in volume due to changes upstream, a case in point being the Garrier, which used to drain Buiston Loch near Kilmaurs. This was drained as part of agricultural improvements and now the Garrier is only seasonal, even though it keeps the name Garrier, even when joined by the Brackenburn and the Lochrig burns that flow all year.

It was not easy being a miller, for instance some people held the belief that it was wrong to use water artificially; that to turn water from its course was to act against God's plan. Ancient mills, it was believed, had been piously placed by their forefathers where they could be worked according to God's order, without artificially embanking the water or turning it from its natural course, which would be sinful. New field drainage work on farms in the 18th and 19th centuries had dramatic effects on water courses, most often recorded through complaints by millers that they could no longer get enough water to turn their mills waterwheels. The weir at Dalgarven on the River Garnock is made of boulders which are carefully placed and locked together to create a natural millpond to supply a good head of water to the wheel through the lade. The weir is built on a natural dyke across the Garnock at this point, its existence being carefully exploited by the monks of Kilwinning Abbey who chose the site for Dalgarven Mill.

The Automatic tide signalling apparatus at Irvine harbour is probably unique, having been invented and patented by Martin Boyd, the Irvine harbour master, in 1905 and opened in 1906. In February 2009 the Lochrig or Lochridge Burn was severely polluted with diesel oil spilled from a train derailed at the railway bridge near Peacockbank farm, Stewarton. Mitigation measures were put in place, however pollution eventually reached the River Irvine.
