= Grannie stone =

The Grannie or Granny stone is either the only surviving part of a stone circle or a simple glacial erratic. It lies in the River Irvine below the Rivergate Centre in Irvine, North Ayrshire, Scotland. The Grannie Stane is clearly visible when the water is low. The GPS co-ordinates are 55°36.768′N 4°40.180′W.

== Grannie stone ==
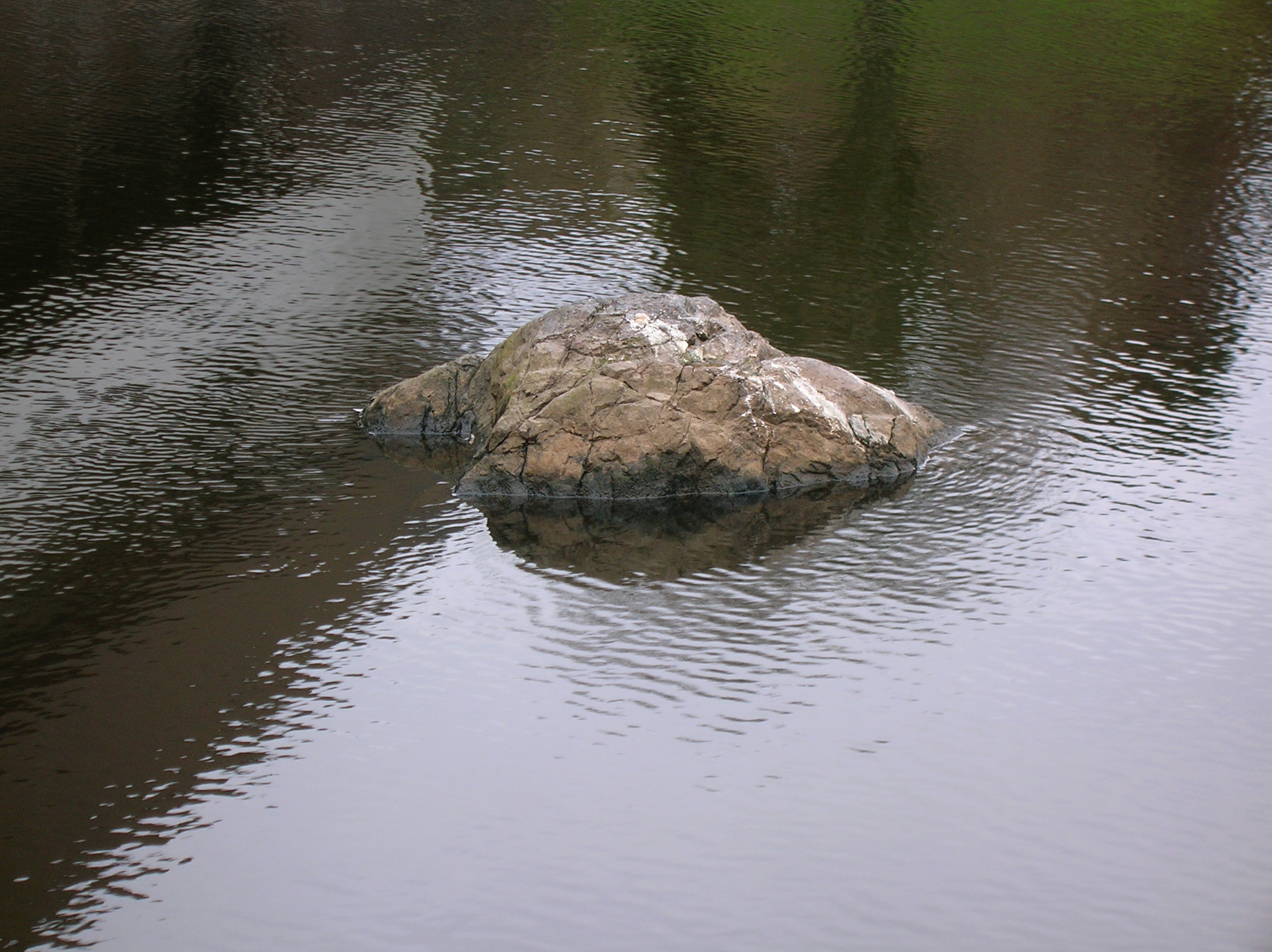
A close up view of the Grannie Stone

The Grannie Stone (or Granny Stane) is described as "One of Irvine's prehistoric puzzles", this boulder is either a glacial erratic left behind from the Ice Age or is the last remaining stone of a stone circle - others were removed, by blasting in 1897 and 1899, after the Irvine weir was constructed in 1895, but popular protests saved this remaining stone. The weir raised the water level and the stone became therefore became less prominent. The stones had been on the upstream side of the old Irvine Bridge. It was also humorously known as 'Paddy's Milestone' after Ailsa Craig due to its supposed resemblance to that island.

=== Origin of the name ===
There has been some speculation as to the origins of the name of the stone, the name may relate to Apollo Grannicus a Romano-British sun God, Grainaig, Grianaig, or Grian a Celtic god of the sea or Granos, the god of thermal springs, which is the most unlikely as there is no evidence of thermal springs in the area. McJannet relates that Grianaig was a goddess who was transformed into a grey boulder. Unfortunately the origins of the name and perhaps other insight that could be gained from folklore have been lost. A Granny stone still exists in Gourock, but on dry land.

=== Uses ===
The stone may simply be a glacial erratic with no archaeological significance and it is not listed by the RCAHMS or mentioned by the outstanding local archaeologist in Victorian times, John Smith. It is not marked on the first edition of the Ordnance Survey map of Irvine.

The Puddlie Doodlie ford, the Puddleford, may have an interesting origin of the name is as 'holy steps' ('pas de Dieu'), the stepping stones by which the monks from the Carmelite Priory made their way to Church. Some of the stepping stones may have come from a group of stones later removed, of which the Granny Stane is the last survivor. Use of the Puddleford by horses was prohibited in 1836 to safeguard access to the Puddly Well, one of the public wells. Stepping stones are marked as recently as 1860 on the OS map of Irvine.

Strawhorn was of the opinion that the stone was part of a stone circle and also thought that some of the other stones were used in the construction of the Puddleford steps.

The Granny stone once served a significant role in the Carters Society's Marymass celebration as they formerly twice circled the stone on their way to the Irvine Moor. This was said to celebrate the crossing of the Irvine at this point by William Wallace in 1297 on his way to attack the English army. This suggests that the stone stood on dry land or in shallower water if the Carters walked round it, not unlikely as the weir built in 1895 had raised the water level.

The episode in 1297 relates to a punitive expedition under Sir Henry Percy sent to Irvine to quash an armed uprising against the dethronement of John Balliol. The Earl of Carrick, Robert Bruce and others led the Scottish army, however after much argument they decided to submit without a fight. The story became embellished with a purely fanciful involvement of William Wallace in a brave action here.

A persistent belief is that the River Irvine has changed its course and the area beneath the Saint Inan's church cemetery was once a green holm on which stood a stone circle with the Granny stone as the largest. The others are said to have been swept away by the river and later broken up as previously stated. An 1890s photograph shows the stone situated at a greater distance from the river bank than it is now.

The Grannie stone and its location within the River Irvine

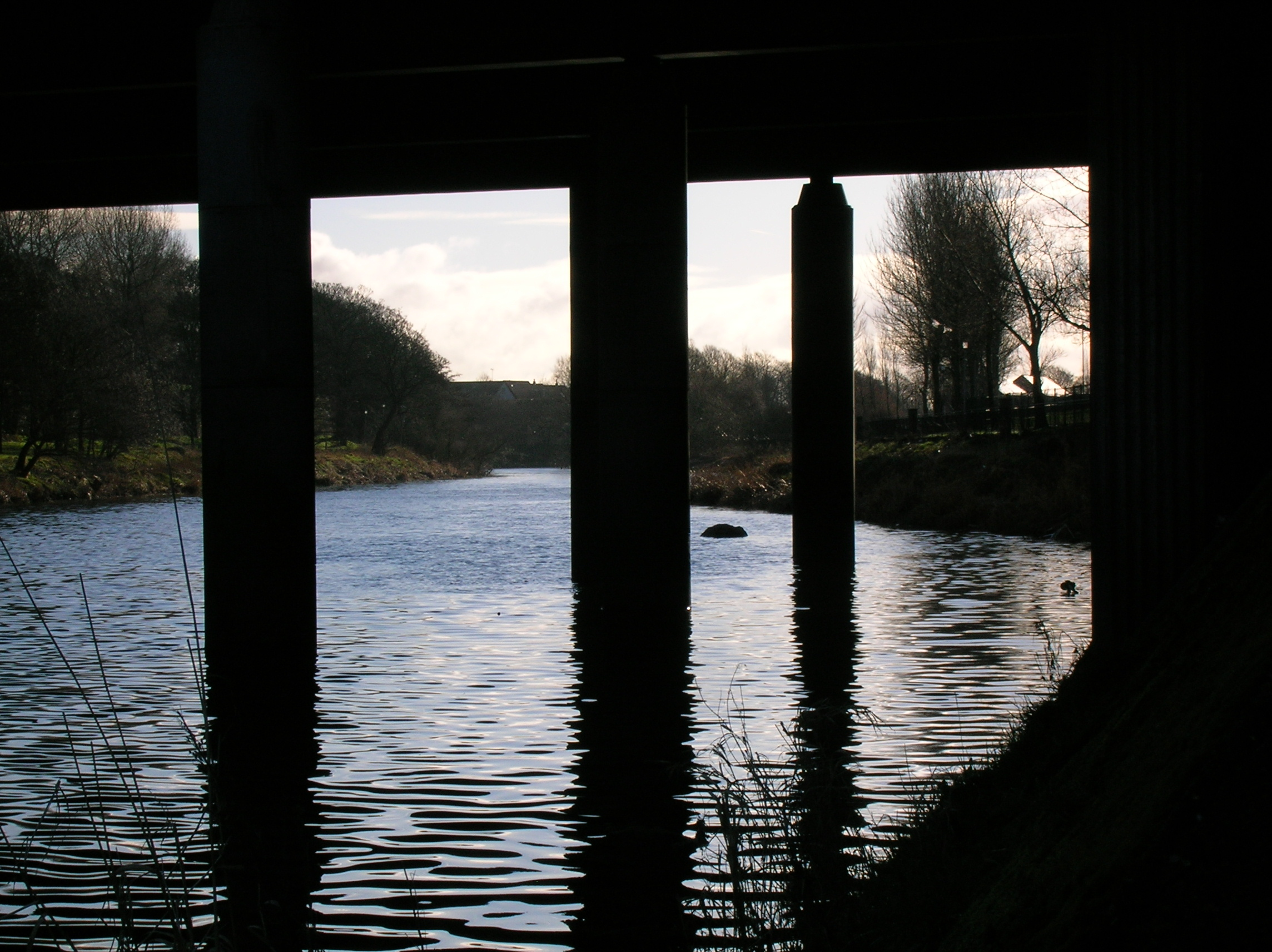
The Grannie stone beneath the Rivergate Centre

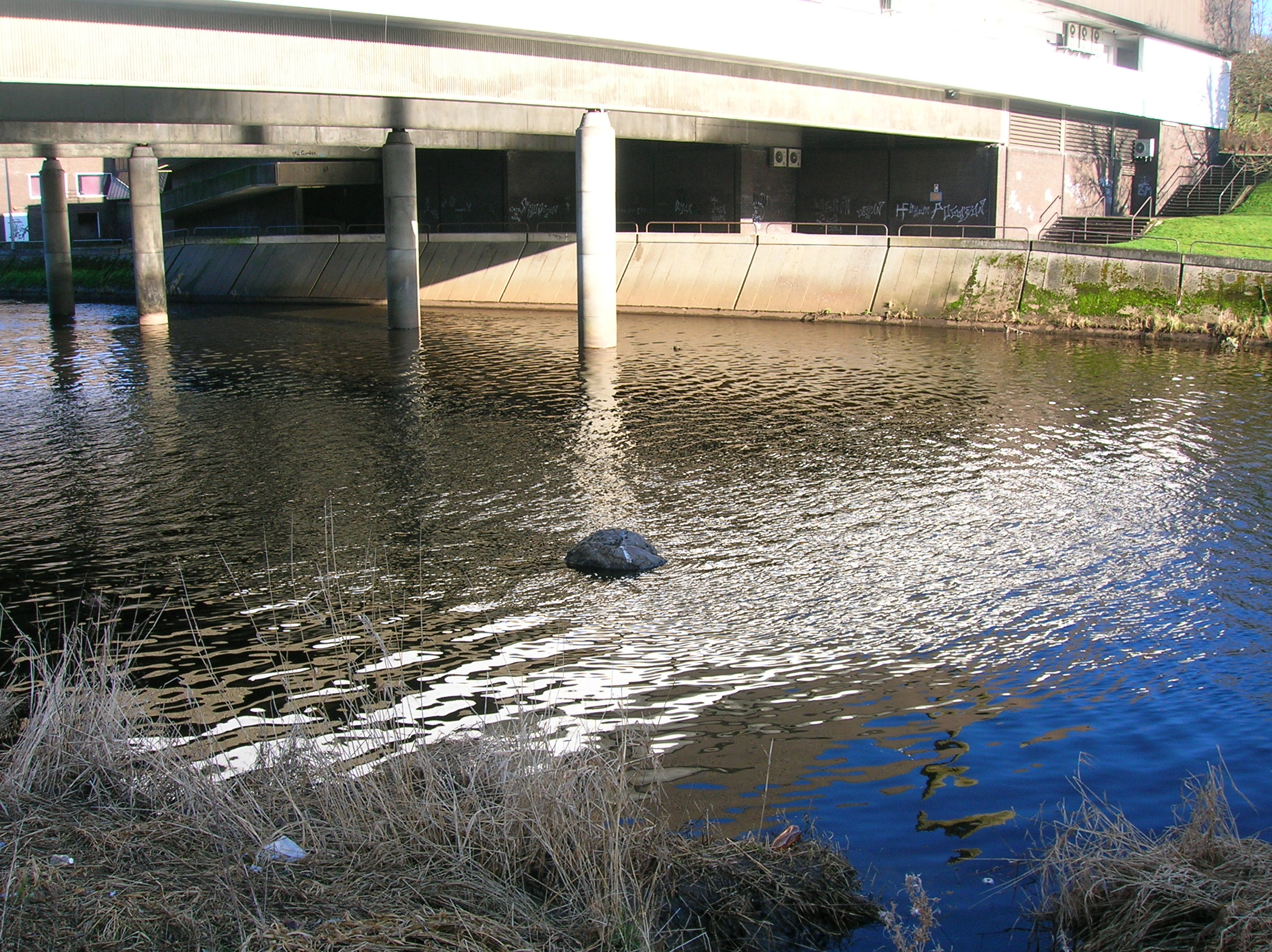
The Grannie stone and the Rivergate Centre on the upstream side

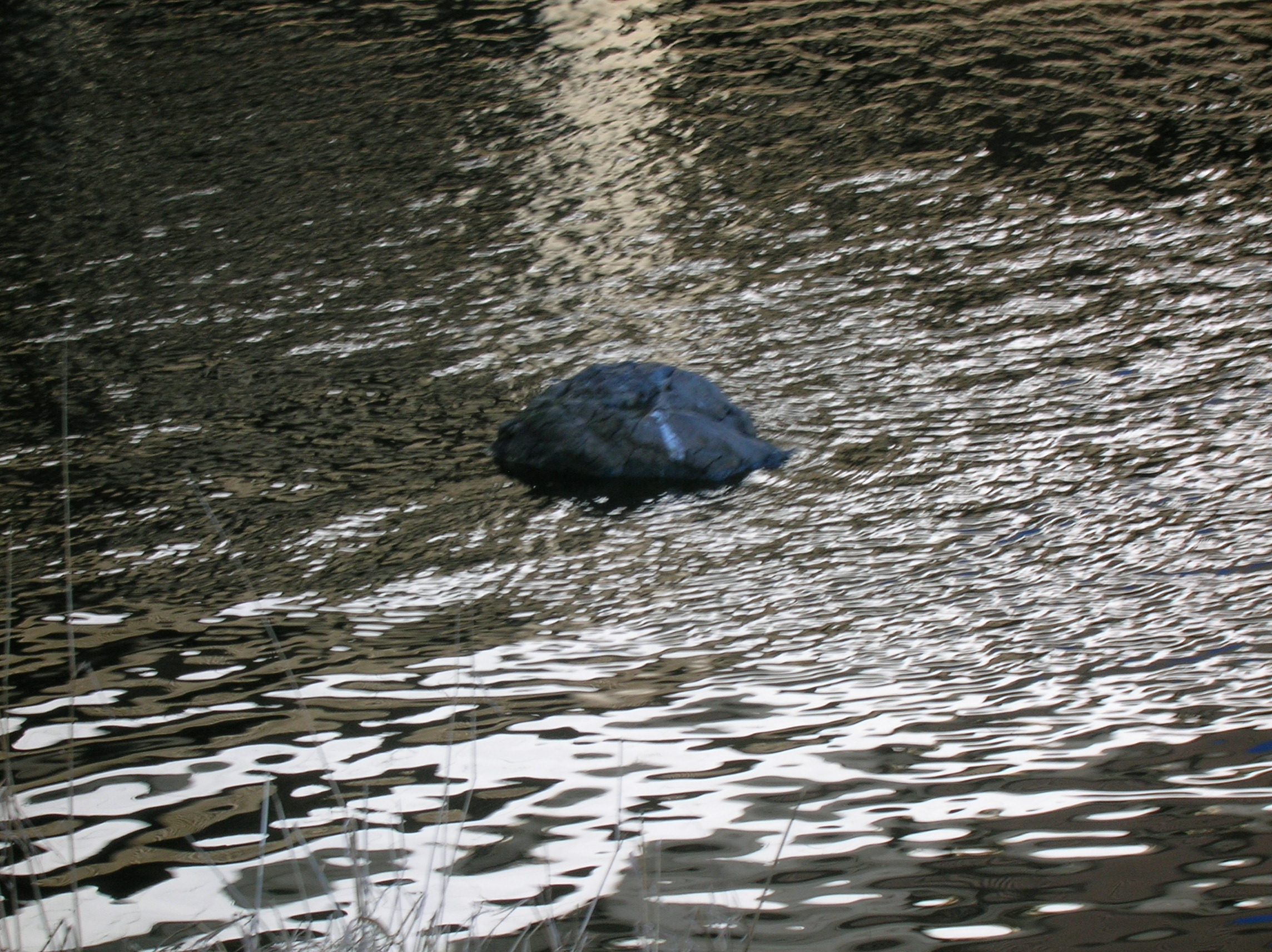
A close-up of the remaining Grannie Stone in the Irvine

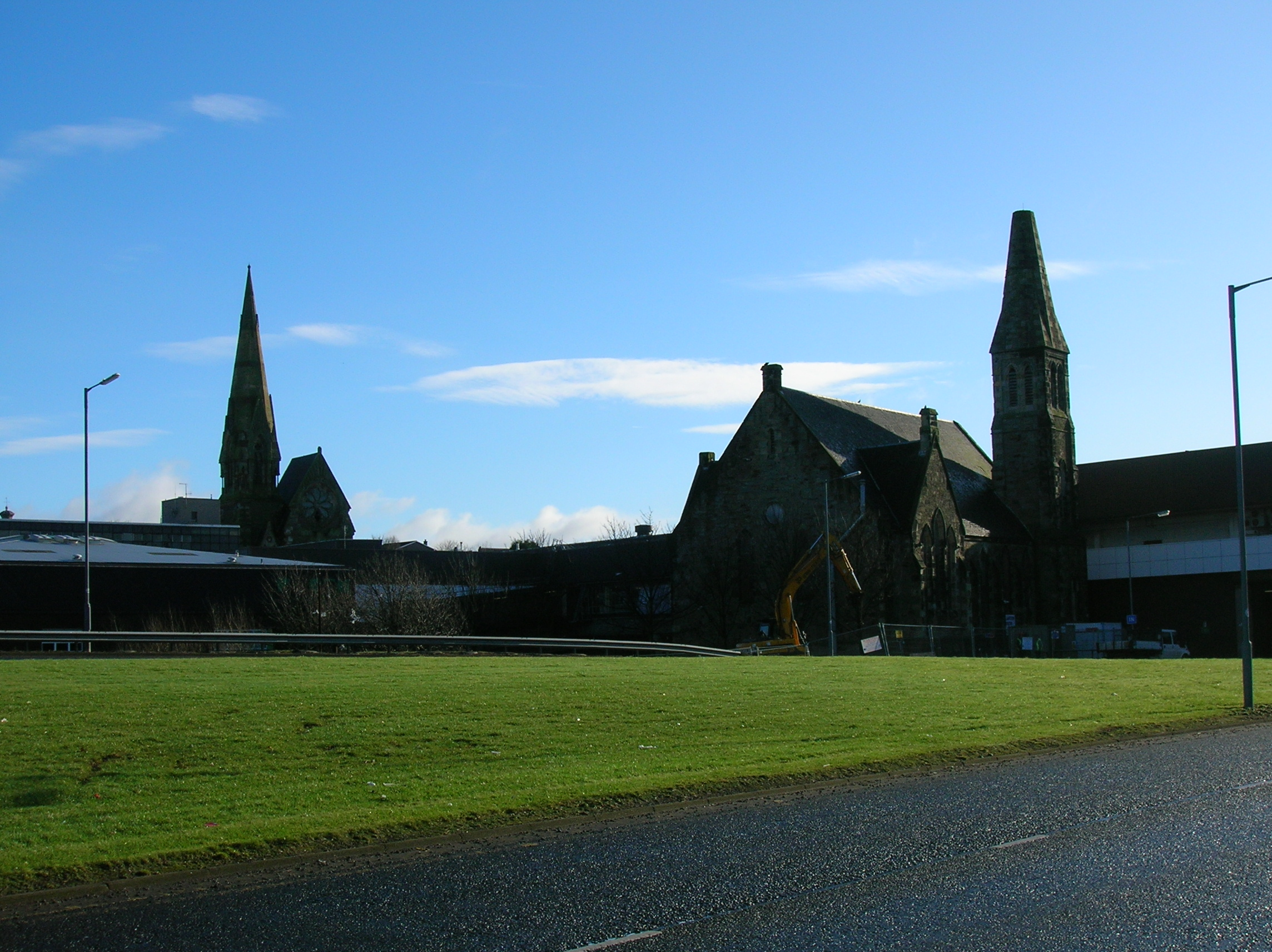
The setting of the Grannie Stone with F. T. Pilkington's 1863 Trinity church to the left and the former Wilson Fullarton Free church to the right

== See also ==
- Granny Kempock Stone
