= Egerton (name) =

The English toponymic surname Egerton may refer to:

== Politics ==
- Alfred Egerton (1854–1890), British politician
- Algernon Egerton (1825–1891), British politician
- Lady Alice Egerton (1923–1977), British courtier
- Arthur Egerton, 3rd Earl of Wilton (1833–1885), British peer and politician
- Bill Egerton (1944–2019) English politician: councillor, council leader and Lord Mayor
- Charles Egerton (MP for Ripon) (1585–1662), English politician
- Charles Egerton (MP for Brackley) (1645–1717), English politician
- Charles Egerton (MP for Wycombe) (1694–1725), English politician
- Edward Egerton (1816–1869), British politician
- Sir Edwin Egerton (1841–1916), British ambassador
- Egerton Reuben Stedman (1872–1946), Canadian politician
- Frances Egerton, Countess of Bridgewater (May 1583 – 11 March 1636), English noblewoman, art patron and book collector
- George Egerton, 2nd Earl of Ellesmere (1823–1862), British peer and politician
- Sir Philip Grey Egerton, 10th Baronet (1806–1881), English Conservative politician and palaeontologist
- Sir Roland Egerton, 1st Baronet (died 1646), English landowner and politician
- Samuel Egerton (1711–1780), British politician
- Scroop Egerton, 1st Duke of Bridgewater (1681–1744), British peer and courtier
- Wilbraham Egerton (MP died 1856) (1781–1856), British landowner and politician
- Wilbraham Egerton, 1st Earl Egerton (1832–1909), British nobleman, businessman and politician
- William Egerton (politician, died 1732) (1684–1732), English politician
- William Egerton (originally William Tatton) (1749–1806), English politician
- William Egerton, 1st Baron Egerton (1806–1883), English peer

== Sports ==
- Billy Egerton (1891–1934), English footballer
- Bob Egerton (born 1963), Australian rugby player
- David Egerton (1961–2021), English former rugby union player

== Military ==
- Brian Egerton (1857–1940), British policeman, soldier, and tutor in India
- Caledon Egerton (1814–1874), British Army general
- Ernest Albert Egerton (1897–1966), English soldier, Victoria Cross recipient
- George Egerton (Royal Navy officer) (1852–1940), British admiral
- Lebbeus Egerton (1773–1846), Vermont militia officer, farmer, lieutenant governor

== Arts ==
- Daniel Egerton (1772–1835), English actor
- Daniel Thomas Egerton (1797–1842), British landscape painter
- Elizabeth Egerton (1626–1663), English writer
- Frank Egerton (born 1959), British novelist
- Helen Merrill Egerton (1866–1951), Canadian writer
- Judy Egerton (1928–2012), Australian-born British art historian and curator
- Julian Egerton (1848–1945), British clarinetist
- Sarah Fyge Egerton (1670–1723), English poet
- Sarah Egerton (actress) (1782–1847), English actress
- Seymour Egerton, 4th Earl of Wilton (1839–1898), British peer and musician
- Tamsin Egerton (born 1988), English actress and model
- Taron Egerton (born 1989), Welsh actor

== Other ==
- Henry Egerton (died 1746), British clergyman, Bishop of Hereford
- Jack Egerton (1918–1998), Australian trade unionist
- Walter Egerton (1858–1947), British colonial administrator

== Disambiguation ==
- Charles Egerton (disambiguation)
- Francis Egerton (disambiguation)
- John Egerton (disambiguation)
- Philip Egerton (disambiguation)
- Stephen Egerton (disambiguation)
- Thomas Egerton (disambiguation)

== Given name ==
- Egerton Cecil (1853–1928), English cricketer
- Sir Egerton Coghill (1853–1921), Irish painter
- Egerton Leigh (1815–1876), British soldier, landowner, politician and author
- Egerton Marcus (born 1965), Canadian retired boxer
- Egerton Herbert Norman (1909–1957; better known as E. Herbert Norman, E. H. Norman, or simply Herbert Norman), a Canadian diplomat accused of being a Communist who committed suicide
- Egerton Ryerson (1803–1882), Canadian Methodist minister, educator, politician and public education advocate
- Egerton Ryerson Young (1840–1909), Canadian teacher, Methodist missionary, lecturer, and author
- Egerton Swartwout (1870–1943), American architect
- Egerton Ryerson Young (1840–1909), author of My Dogs in the Northland (1902), which Jack London used as source material for The Call of the Wild (1903)

== See also ==
- Egerton family, British aristocratic family
- Paul Egertson (1935–2011), American Lutheran clergyman
