= Charles Egerton =

Charles Egerton may refer to:

- Charles Egerton (Indian Army officer) (1848–1921), senior British army officer
- Charles Egerton (MP for Ripon) (1585–1662), English politician
- Charles Egerton (MP for Brackley) (1645–1717), English politician
- Charles Egerton (MP for Wycombe) (1694–1725), English politician
- Charles Chandler Egerton (1798–1885), English surgeon
- Sir Charles Bulkeley Egerton (1774–1857), British Army officer
- Charles Egerton (racehorse trainer), in 2009 Grand National

== See also ==
- Charles Egerton Osgood (1916–1991), American psychologist and professor
- Egerton (surname)
