= Sir Philip Grey Egerton, 9th Baronet =

The Reverend Sir Philip Grey-Egerton, 9th Baronet (6 July 1767 – 12 December 1829), was a 19th-century Anglican clergyman and landowner, who succeeded to his family baronetcy and served as Rector of Tarporley and Malpas, Cheshire.

== Background ==
Born in 1767, the second son of Philip Egerton (1731 – 1786) and Mary Eyles, only surviving daughter and eventual heiress of Sir Francis Eyles-Stiles, Sir Philip succeeded in the baronetcy from his elder brother, Sir John Grey-Egerton, Bt. MP, who died without issue in 1825.

Egerton assumed by Royal Licence the additional surname and arms of Grey, inheriting the ancestral seat of Oulton Hall and other estates, together with the lordship of the manor of Egerton and the advowson of Malpas, Cheshire.

== Family ==
Grey-Egerton arms

In 1804, Egerton married Rebecca du Pré, daughter of Josias du Pré, Governor of Madras, by his wife Rebecca Alexander, sister of James Alexander, 1st Earl of Caledon.
Sir Philip and Lady Grey-Egerton had the following issue:

- Mary Anne Elizabeth Egerton, married 1841 Charles Robert Cotton, grandson of Sir Lynch Cotton, 4th Baronet, MP;
- Sir Philip de Malpas Grey-Egerton (13 Nov 1805 – 5 Apr 1881), succeeded as 10th baronet, married 1832 Anna Elizabeth Legh, daughter of George John Legh, High Sheriff of Cheshire (1805);
- Lieutenant-Colonel Charles du Pré Egerton (4 Jan 1809 – 30 Jun 1855), o/c the Rifle Brigade, was killed in action at Crimea;
- Major John Francis Egerton (10 Aug 1810 – 23 Jan 1846), serving with the Royal Bengal Artillery, died from wounds sustained at the Battle of Ferozeshah in the First Anglo-Sikh War;
- Revd Preb. William Henry Egerton (13 Nov 1811 – 16 Mar 1910), Rector of Whitchurch, married 1840 Louisa Cunliffe, daughter of Brook Cunliffe, grandfather of the Revd Sir Brooke Egerton later Grey-Egerton, 13th Baronet, Rector of Stoke-on-Tern;
- Major-General Caledon Richard Egerton (28 July 1814 – 27 May 1874), served in the Crimean War, married Margaret Cumming, grandfather of Sir Philip Egerton later Grey-Egerton, 14th Baronet, and great-grandfather of Major-General Sir David Egerton, 16th Baronet;
- Commander Frederic Arthur Egerton, RN (30 Apr 1816 – 2 May 1857);
- Revd Preb. George Henry Egerton (20 Feb 1822 – 12 Jul 1905), Rector of Myddle, married firstly 1846 Mary née Stone, widow of Sir William Marjoribanks, 2nd Baronet, and secondly 1881 Clara Oswald.

== See also ==
- Egerton family
