= David Egerton (British Army officer) =

Major-General Sir David Egerton Bt CB OBE MC
- Born: 24 July 1914; Grimsby, Lincolnshire, England
- Died: 17 November 2010 (aged 96); London, England
- Relatives: Grey-Egerton baronets Vice Admiral Wion de Malpas Egerton (father); Field Marshal Sir Charles Egerton (grandfather)
- Military career
- Allegiance: United Kingdom
- Branch: British Army
- Service years: 1933–1970
- Rank: Major-General
- Service number: 63503
- Conflicts: Second World War: Battle of France; Battle of Alam Halfa; First Battle of El Alamein; Second Battle of El Alamein; Italian campaign
- Awards: Companion of the Order of the Bath; Officer of the Order of the British Empire; Military Cross

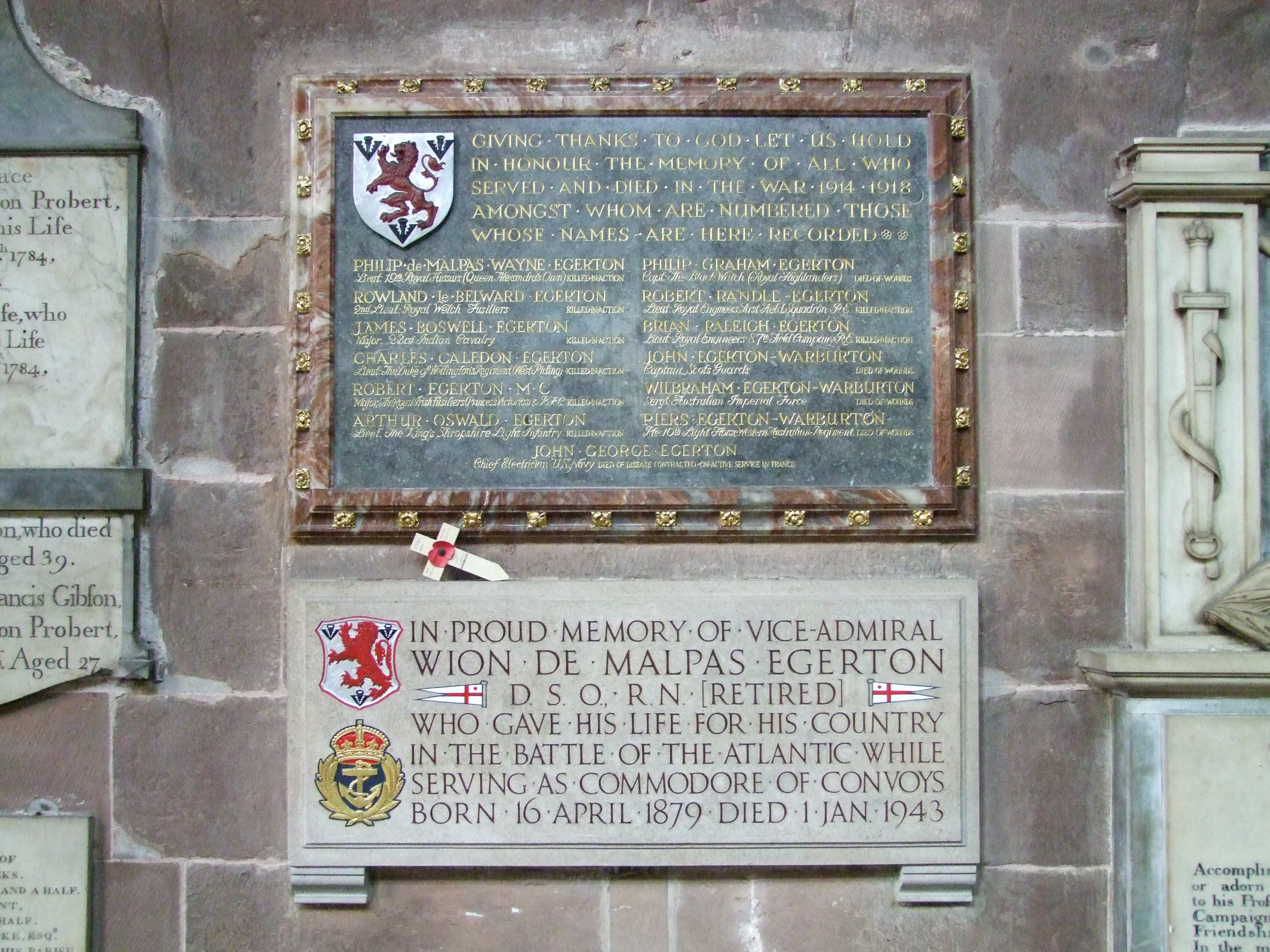
Egerton memorial tablets in Chester Cathedral: (top) to family members killed during the First World War and (below) to Vice-Admiral Wion Egerton

Major-General Sir David Boswell Egerton, 16th Baronet, CB, OBE, MC (24 July 1914 – 17 November 2010) was a senior British Army officer from the aristocratic Egerton family.

== Family ==
Egerton's immediate family were cadets of the ancient and noble Egertons, seated at Oulton in Cheshire since the Middle Ages. His father, Wion Egerton, was born in the Punjab in 1879 and joined the Royal Navy, being awarded the Distinguished Service Order in 1917 and rising to the rank of vice admiral. Admiral Egerton died in 1943. David's mother Anita, only daughter of Major Albert Rudolph David, died in 1972.

His paternal grandfather, uncle of Sir Philip Grey-Egerton, 14th Baronet, was Field Marshal Sir Charles Egerton, who was commissioned into the Indian Army.

== Military career ==
Egerton was commissioned in the Royal Artillery and served with distinction in the Second World War. A career soldier, he was Director-General of Artillery in the Ministry of Defence (1964–67), Vice-President and Senior Army Member Ordnance Board (1967–69), President (1969–70) and Colonel Commandant of the Royal Artillery until 1975. After being promoted to the rank of Major-General he retired from the British Army and was appointed Secretary-General of the Association of Recognised English Language Services (1971–79), being elected a Fellow of the Institute of Linguists (FIL).

== Personal life ==
Egerton married Margaret Gillian, youngest daughter of Canon Charles Cuthbert Inge, Rector of Streatley, Berkshire, on 10 April 1946. Egerton and his wife had three children: William (born 1949), who succeeded to the baronetcy in 2010, and two daughters, Charlotte (born 1950) and Caroline (born 1955).

Egerton succeeded his second cousin, Sir John Grey-Egerton, 15th Baronet, to the baronetcy in 2008.

== Arms ==
Coat of arms of David Egerton
Notes By Royal Licence 1825, Rev Sir Philip Egerton later Grey-Egerton, 9th Bt. took the additional name and supporters of Grey before that of Egerton, a tradition discontinued by his g-g-g-grandson, General Sir David Egerton, 16th Bt, CB Crest Three Arrows two in saltire Argent and one in pale point downwards Or barbed and feathered Sable banded with a Ribbon Gules Helm That of a Baronet Escutcheon Argent a Lion rampant Gules between three Pheons Sable, in centre chief an Inescutcheon Argent charged of a Sinister Hand erect epaumée couped Gules (for a Baronet) Motto VIRTUTI NON ARMIS FIDO Orders The Shield is surrounded by the Bath circlet, inscribed with its motto: TRIA JUNCTA IN UNO

Baronetage of England
Preceded by John Grey-Egerton; 15th Baronet	Baronet (of Egerton and Oulton); 2008–2010	Succeeded by William Egerton; 17th Baronet
