= Listed buildings in Little Budworth =

Little Budworth is a civil parish in Cheshire West and Chester, England. It contains 18 buildings that are recorded in the National Heritage List for England as designated listed buildings. Of these, four are listed at Grade II*, and the others at Grade II. Other than the village of Little Budworth, the parish is completely rural, and this is reflected in its listed buildings. These are all domestic or related to farming, other than the village church, a memorial, the entrance gates to the former Oulton Park House, a pinfold, and the plague stone.

== Key ==
Grade	Criteria
II*	Particularly important buildings of more than special interest.
II	Buildings of national importance and special interest.

== Buildings ==
Name and location	Photograph	Date	Notes	Grade
Plague stone 53.20593°N 2.62204°W		Late medieval (probable)	This consists of a square piece of sandstone with a hollowed top mounted on a 19th-century sandstone plinth with chamfered edges.	II
St Peter's Church; 53.1839°N 2.6022°W		15th–16th century	The tower was built between about 1490 and 1526 in Perpendicular style. The body of the church was rebuilt in 1798–1800, and the interior was restored in 1870–71 by John Douglas. It is constructed in sandstone with a slate roof, and consists of a nave, a chancel, and a west tower.	II*
Holmston Hall Farmhouse; 53.1587°N 2.5881°W	—	Mid-17th century	Additions were made later in the 17th century. It is constructed in brick on a stone plinth with sandstone dressings, including quoins, and has a slate roof. The house is in two storeys with an attic. The windows are casements.	II
Oultonlow Green; 53.1609°N 2.5823°W	—	Mid-17th century	A timber-framed house with rendered whitewashed infill. It has a thatched roof, and is in two storeys. The entrance front has a gabled wing on the right and a gabled porch in the centre with a thatched roof. The windows are casements and dormers.	II
Darley Hall Farmhouse; 53.1736°N 2.5887°W		17th century	Additions were made in the early 18th century. The farmhouse is in brick with a 20th-century pantile roof. It has three storeys, and is in a T-shaped plan. The entrance front has three bays.	II
Barn, Holmston Hall Farm; 53.1588°N 2.5889°W	—	Mid- to late 17th century	Additions and alterations were made to the barn in the 19th century. It is timber-framed, covered by clapboard, and with a slate roof. The features include doorways, single-light windows, loft doors, and three pigeon loft holes.	II
Almshouses; 53.1837°N 2.6077°W		Late 17th century	The almshouses are constructed in brick with sandstone dressings and a tiled roof. They are in two storeys, with a symmetrical entrance front of five bays. There is a central round-headed doorway surrounded by quoins and voussoirs. The windows are mullioned. The garden wall is included in the listing.	II*
Church View and Old Hall Cottage; 53.1837°N 2.6017°W		Late 17th century	These are two cottages, Old Hall Cottage being built in the late 17th century, and Church View in the late 18th to early 19th century. Old Hall Cottage is timber-framed with brick infill on a rendered plinth, and has casement windows. Church View is built in brick.	II
Old Vicarage; 53.1834°N 2.6047°W		Late 17th century	Additions were made to the former vicarage in the 19th century. It is constructed in whitewashed brick and has a thatched roof. The house is in two storeys with two bays on the front facing the road. On the left side is a 19th-century canted bay window. The other windows are casements.	II
Pinfold; 53.1846°N 2.6102°W		17th or 18th century	The pinfold consists of a square enclosure in coursed ashlar stone. It has an entrance on its western side containing 20th-century wooden gates.	II
Outside Farmhouse; 53.1972°N 2.5870°W	—	Early 18th century	The farmhouse was extended later in the 18th century. It is constructed in rendered brick with a slate roof. The house is in two storeys, with an entrance front of four bays. There is a stone band between the floors, and pilaster buttresses. The windows are casements.	II
Farm building, Oulton Park; 53.1776°N 2.6082°W		Mid-18th century	Constructed in brick with a slate roof, this is a single-storey building with an attic. It stands on an ashlar plinth and has chamfered quoins on the corners.	II
Well House Farmhouse; 53.1841°N 2.6001°W	—	Mid-18th century	The farmhouse is built in brick on a stone plinth and has a slate roof. It is in two storeys and has an entrance front of three bays. To the left of the centre is a gabled 19th-century porch. The windows are casements.	II
Oulton Millhouse; 53.1814°N 2.6290°W	—	Mid- to late 18th century	Constructed in brick with a slate roof, the house has two storeys plus attics. Its entrance front is symmetrical and comprises three bays, with a central 20th-century porch. The windows are casements.	II
Screens, lodges and gates, Oulton Park; 53.1833°N 2.6131°W		c. 1775	These were designed by Joseph Turner for the Oulton Estate, and are constructed in sandstone. There is a central arched gateway containing iron gates, Above the arch is a heraldic shield, and Rococo decoration, including swags. Flanking the gateway are two-storey lodges with large blind arches and pedimented gables and more swags. Outside the lodges are curved screen walls.	II*
Stable block, Oulton Park; 53.1773°N 2.6098°W	—	c. 1820	Designed for Oulton Estate by Lewis Wyatt, it consists of a brick building with a slate roof. It has an L-shaped plan and is in two storeys. The larger block has nine bays, with a central pedimented gable containing a clock face and surmounted by a timber bellcote with a saddleback roof. The other block has six bays.	II
Monument, Oulton Park; 53.18241°N 2.61452°W		1846 or 1847	The monument is to John Francis Egerton, and was designed by Scott and Moffatt. It is in the form of an Eleanor cross, is in Gothic style, its features including statues, pinnacles and a spire.	II*
Oulton Smithy; 53.1819°N 2.6220°W	—	Undated	This consists of a house with an attached smithy. It is built in colour-washed brick and has a slate roof. The building is in two storeys, with an L-shaped plan and an entrance front of two bays. The windows are casements.	II

== See also ==
- Listed buildings in Darnhall
- Listed buildings in Delamere
- Listed buildings in Rushton
- Listed buildings in Utkinton
- Listed buildings in Whitegate and Marton
- Listed buildings in Winsford
