= Roland Egerton =

Roland Egerton may refer to:

- Rowland Egerton-Warburton, English landowner and poet
- Sir Roland Egerton, 1st Baronet, English landowner and politician
