= St Peter's Church, Little Budworth =

Coordinates: 53.1839°N 2.6022°W

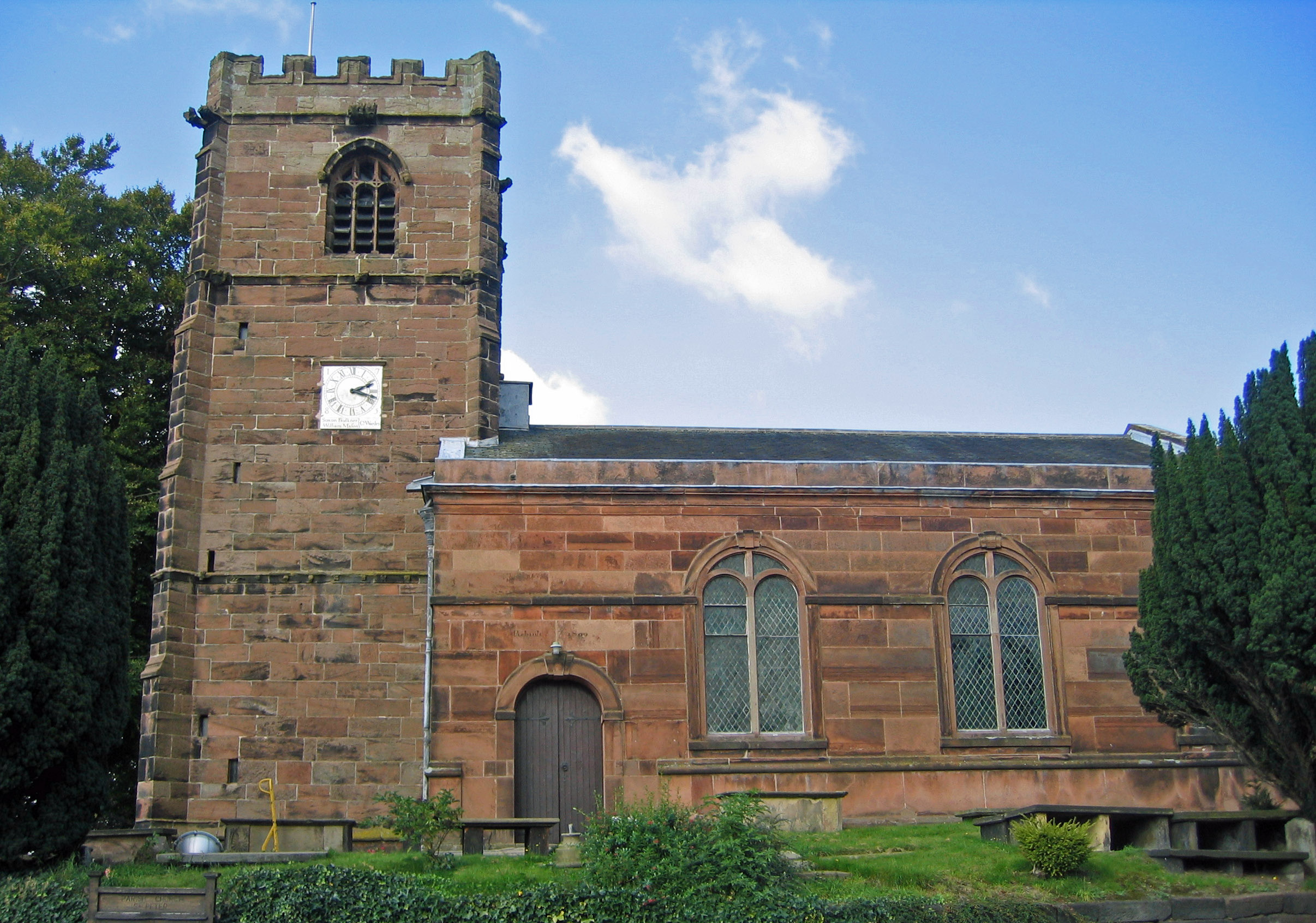
- St Peter's Church, Little Budworth, from the south

- Location in Cheshire
- OS grid reference: SJ 598,655
- Location: Little Budworth, Cheshire
- Country: England
- Denomination: Anglican
- Website: St Peter, Little Budworth

History
- Status: Parish church
- Dedication: St Peter

Architecture
- Functional status: Active
- Heritage designation: Grade II*
- Designated: 3 January 1967
- Architect: John Douglas (restoration)
- Architectural type: Church
- Style: Perpendicular, Neoclassical
- Completed: 1871

Specifications
- Materials: Red sandstone Slate roof

Administration
- Province: York
- Diocese: Chester
- Archdeaconry: Chester
- Deanery: Middlewich
- Parish: Little Budworth, St Peter

Clergy
- Abbot: Steve Simpson
- Vicar: The Revd Canon Paul Dawson The Revd Jane Millinchip The Revd Dr John Stopford

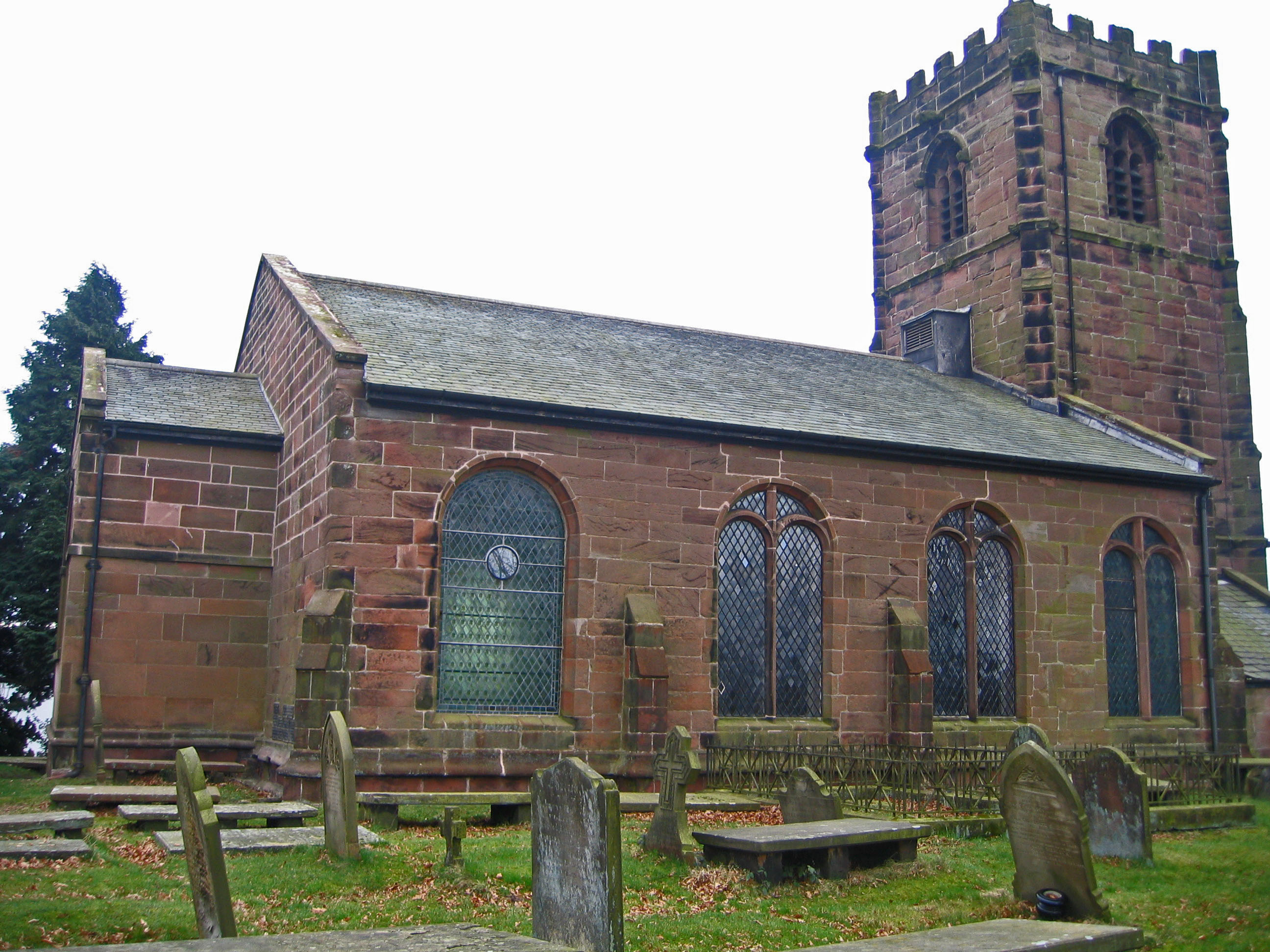
North front

St Peter's Church is in the village of Little Budworth, Cheshire, England. The church is recorded in the National Heritage List for England as a designated Grade II* listed building. It is an active Anglican parish church in the diocese of Chester, the archdeaconry of Chester and the deanery of Middlewich. Its benefice is combined with that of St Mary, Whitegate. The church stands on the highest point in the village and its tower dominates views of the area.

There is disagreement about the correct dedication of the church. The historian George Ormerod, writing in 1816, stated that it was dedicated to St Mary and All Saints. However a bequest in 1526 was made by Hugh Starkey of Oulton to "St. Peter of Budworth" and the church is usually now referred to as St Peter's. Another source considers the full original dedication might have been to "St Mary, St Peter and All Saints".

== History ==
The existence of a church on the site was recorded in 1190. The present west tower was erected between 1490 and 1526. The body of the church was rebuilt in stone in 1800 following a bequest from Ralph Kirkham, a wealthy merchant of Manchester. This consisted of a nave and sanctuary with no architectural division, which Richards describes as being "a poor attempt at imitation of the classical style". The Egerton family of nearby Oulton Hall were benefactors of the church. Their family vault was in the church. This was sealed in 1870. In 1870–71 the interior was restored by the Chester architect John Douglas, the restoration including the removal of pews, a gallery and the ceiling. By 1936 the roof timbers were becoming unsafe and they were replaced by a steel roof.

== Architecture ==
=== Exterior ===
The church is built in red sandstone ashlar with a slate roof. Its plan consists of a west tower with a four-bay nave and chancel in one range. The tower has diagonal buttresses and is in three stages, the stages being divided by string courses. The lowest stage includes an arched west door above which is a three-light window and over this an empty niche. On the south face is a clock face dated 1785 inscribed with the names of the churchwardens. The topmost stage has three-light louvred bell openings on each face. The top of the tower has an embattled parapet. On the south face is a round-arched door in the west bay and three round-arched two-light windows, and on the north face are four similar windows. The east end has a round-arched three-light window.

=== Interior ===
The ceilings of the nave and chancel are plastered barrel vaults. The pulpit dates from the Georgian period, and the painted font from the 17th century. The latter has a fluted bowl with a scrolled cover resting on an octagonal base. It is one of the few painted fonts remaining in the county. The pulpit dates probably from about 1800, and has fluted angle pilasters. Also in the church is a 19th-century family pew. Memorials to members of the Egerton family include a brass relating to an incident in the Crimean War. Philip R. Egerton donated to the church a painting by Caravaggio, or a member of his school, depicting The Deposition from the Cross.^{[A]} A few fragments of pre-Reformation stained glass remain. A war memorial in stained glass to members of the Egerton family lost in the First World War is by Heaton, Butler and Bayne. The organ is a highly original two-manual instrument by William Hill & Sons of London, which is thought to date from about 1860. It still retains its original hand-pumped bellows. In the tower arch is an etched window dating from 2002. There is a ring of five bells. Three of these, dated 1714, are by Rudhall of Gloucester. Of the others, one is by John Warner and Sons dated 1884, and the other is by James Barwell and is dated 1893. The parish registers begin in 1561.

== External features ==
The churchyard, divided into "Old Ground" and "New Ground", contains the war graves of four soldiers of World War I, three of which are in the New Ground.

== See also ==
- Grade II* listed buildings in Cheshire West and Chester
- Listed buildings in Little Budworth
- List of church restorations, amendments and furniture by John Douglas

== Notes ==
^{A} Concerning the attribution of the painting, the authors of the Buildings of England series make the comment "good (but not at all Caravaggio)".
