= Listed buildings in Darnhall =

Darnhall is a civil parish in Cheshire West and Chester, England. It contains eight buildings that are recorded in the National Heritage List for England as designated listed buildings, all of which are at Grade II. This grade is the lowest of the three gradings given to listed buildings and is applied to "buildings of national importance and special interest". The parish is entirely rural and this is reflected in the nature of the listed buildings, which consist of three farmhouses, a mill house, a mill, stables, and two bridges.

Name and location	Photograph	Date	Notes
Weaver Hall; 53.1751°N 2.4958°W	—	Mid- to late 17th century	The farmhouse was altered in the 19th century. It is constructed in brick with slate roofs. The building has three storeys and an attic, and is in an H-shaped plan. Inside the house is an inglenook with a chamfered bressumer.
Dairy House Farmhouse; 53.1788°N 2.5077°W	—	Late 17th century	The farmhouse is timber-framed with brick infill and roofs of slate and tile. To the right is a single-storey timber-framed wing, and to the left is a two-storey 18th-century addition. The windows are casements.
Ashbrook Bridge; 53.15890°N 2.51565°W		1775 (rebuilding)	The bridge carries the B5074 Church Minshull to Winsford road over Ash Brook. It has a single span and is constructed in sandstone. The piers at the ends have pyramidal caps.
Darnhall Bridge; 53.16416°N 2.54480°W	—	Late 18th to early 19th century	A single-span sandstone bridge carrying Darnhall Lane over Ash Brook. The stone is rusticated, and the bridge has a basket arch with voussoirs. At both ends on each side are piers.
Darnham Mill; 53.1649°N 2.5475°W	—	1829	A water-powered mill in whitewashed brick with a slate roof, and some sandstone in the basement. The entrance front is in three bays, with a central doorway and a hoist door above. On each side on both floors are casement windows, and there are similar windows elsewhere. The overshot iron waterwheel is still present.
Mill House; 53.1646°N 2.5476°W	—	c. 1829	A house in whitewashed brick with a slate roof. It is in two storeys, with a T-shaped plan. The entrance front is in three bays, and the windows are casements.
Stables; 53.1654°N 2.5487°W	—	Mid-19th century	A stable block to the former Darnham Hall, which has been demolished. It is constructed in brick with slate roofs, and has a courtyard plan. It is in a single storey, other than the entrance tower and three attached cottages, which have two storeys. The coach house has double carriage doors, above which is a pediment containing an octagonal clock face. Over this is an octagonal bellcote with arched openings, pilasters, and a domed top.
Weaver Park Farmhouse; 53.1623°N 2.5146°W	—	Mid-19th century	A brick farmhouse with a slate roof in three storeys. It has a T-shaped plan, and a symmetrical entrance front of three bays with a central porch. The windows are casements.

== See also ==
- Listed buildings in Winsford
- Listed buildings in Little Budworth
- Listed buildings in Church Minshull
- Listed buildings in Stanthorne
- Listed buildings in Wimboldsley
