= Sir John Grey Egerton, 8th Baronet =

Sir John Grey Egerton, 8th Baronet (11 July 1766 – 24 May 1825) was a politician from the Egerton family in Cheshire, England. He was Member of Parliament (MP) for Chester from 1807 to 1818.

== Family and early life ==
He was born John Egerton, the son of Philip Egerton of Oulton by his cousin, Mary, sister and sole heiress of Sir John Haskin Eyles Styles, 4th Bt. One of his younger brothers was Richard Egerton, an army officer. He was educated at King's School, Chester and Tarvin School. He served as High Sheriff of Cheshire for 1793–94.

== Peerage ==
In 1814, he succeeded to the Egerton baronetcy on the death of Thomas Egerton, Viscount Grey de Wilton and Earl of Wilton, a distant relative, and took the surname Grey Egerton. His family seat was Oulton Park.

== Career ==
He became a successful racehorse owner, and served as Grand Master of the Cheshire Freemasons.

== Personal life ==
On 9 April 1795 he married Maria, daughter of and sole heir of Thomas Scott Jackson, a Director of Bank of England.

== Death ==
He died childless in London, aged 58, a few days after a carriage accident on 19 May 1825 at Epsom Races. His funeral at Little Budworth on 8 June 1825 was attended by 10,000–12,000 people, with 17 of the 19 Cheshire Freemason Lodges being present.

He was succeeded by his brother, Philip. His wife, Maria, died, and then was buried on 23 August 1830.

Parliament of the United Kingdom
Preceded by Thomas Grosvenor and Richard Erle-Drax-Grosvenor	Member of Parliament for Chester; 1807–1818; With: Thomas Grosvenor	Succeeded by Viscount Belgrave and Thomas Grosvenor
Baronetage of England
Preceded by Thomas Egerton	Baronet (of Egerton and Oulton); 1814–1825	Succeeded by Philip Grey Egerton
