= Philip Egerton =

Philip Egerton may refer to:

- Sir Philip Egerton (died 1698), of Oulton, Tory landowner, MP for Cheshire (UK Parliament constituency)
- Sir Philip Grey Egerton, 9th Baronet (1767–1829)
- Sir Philip Grey Egerton, 10th Baronet (1806–1881), English palaeontologist and Conservative politician
- Philip Egerton (priest) (1832–1911), English schoolmaster, priest, and cricketer
- Sir Philip Grey-Egerton, 11th Baronet (1833–1891), of the Grey Egerton baronets
- Sir Philip Grey Egerton, 12th Baronet (1864–1937), British Army officer
- Sir Philip Reginald le Belward Grey Egerton, 14th Baronet (1885 –1962), British Army officer
