= Monument to Captain John Francis Egerton =

Coordinates: 53.18241°N 2.61452°W

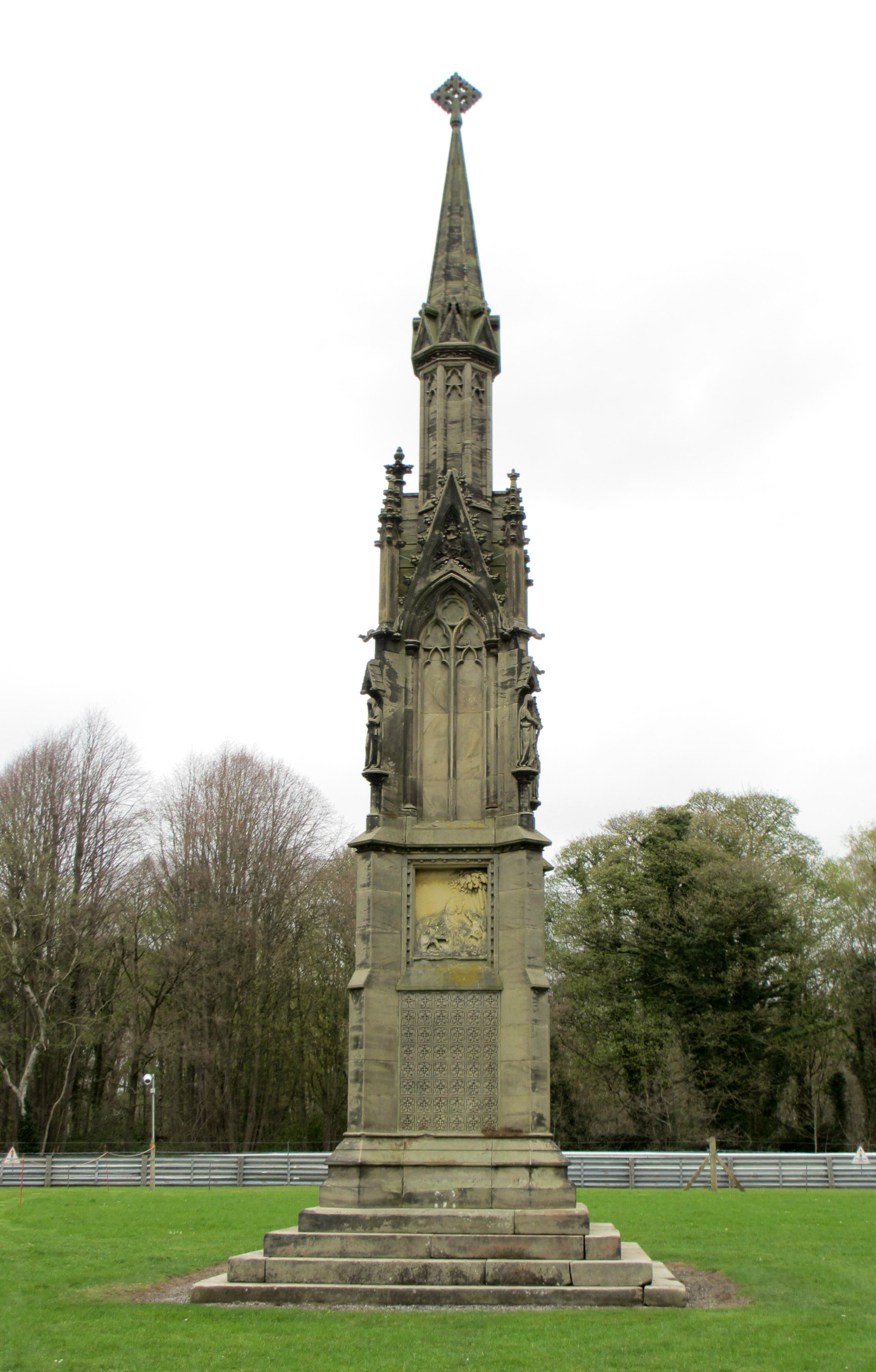
South face of the Monument

The Monument to Captain John Francis Egerton stands in the grounds of the Oulton Estate, Little Budworth, Cheshire, England. John Francis Egerton died in 1846 as the result of injuries sustained in the First Anglo-Sikh War. The memorial was designed by George Gilbert Scott and William Bonython Moffatt, and is recorded in the National Heritage List for England as a designated Grade II* listed building.

== History ==
John Francis Egerton (1810–1846) was a younger brother of Sir Philip Grey Egerton, 10th Baronet, owner of the Oulton Estate in Cheshire. He was serving as a Captain in the Bengal Artillery in the First Anglo-Sikh War when he fought in the Battle of Ferozeshah on 21–22 December 1845. After severe fighting, the Sikhs were defeated. When Egerton was reconnoitring on the site of the battle he was injured by two Sikhs who were hiding in the village. He died from his wounds on 23 January 1846 and was buried at Ferozepore.

There was a meeting of the subscribers to the Egerton Memorial in May 1846. They had received a letter from Sir Philip suggesting that the memorial could take the form of stained glass in Malpas church, or a monument in the grounds of the Oulton Estate. The meeting chose the latter option, and appointed a committee to arrange it. They appointed the architects Scott and Moffatt to design the memorial. Its sculptor is unknown.

== Description ==
The monument is in Gothic style, and is in the form of an Eleanor cross. (Note: Eleanor crosses were erected by King Edward I in the late 13th century to commemorate the life of his wife, Eleanor of Castile, and were erected on the sites where her coffin rested. The typical design of an Eleanor cross is that of a polygonal base on steps, surmounted by stages of reducing size.) It is constructed in yellow sandstone, and consists of an Eleanor cross about 9.6 metres (31 ft) high standing on steps 0.8 metres (2.6 ft) high. The cross stands on five square steps, and consists of a square base in two stages, an octagonal turret, and an octagonal spire surmounted by a cross. The lower stage of the base is relatively plain and has diagonal buttresses. On the south face is decoration in diapering above which is a panel carved in relief. The carving is badly weathered and its subject appears to depict a house and classical figures. On the sides of the memorial are blank panels, and on the north face is an inscribed bronze plaque. The upper stage of the base is narrower, and also has diagonal buttresses; these have canopied niches containing statues of female figures in medieval dress. Above the niches the buttresses rise to crocketed pinnacles with gargoyles. The faces between them contain tracery and above are crocketed gables. The octagonal turret is decorated with blank tracery, and at its top is a cornice with gables. The turret is surmounted by the spire.

The bronze plaque on the north face contains an inscription reading as follows.

IN MEMORY OF JOHN FRANCIS EGERTON SON OF HE LATE REVEREND
SIR PHILIP GREY EGERTON OF OULTON PARK BARONET BORN X AUGUST
MDCCCX DIED XXIII JANUARY MDCCCXLVI THE DECEASED WAS A CAPTAIN
IN THE BENGAL ARTILLERY AND WAS A DEPUTY ASSISTANT QUARTER
MASTER GENERAL IN THE ARMY OF THE SUTLEGE IN DECEMBER MDCCCXLV
HE WAS PRESENT WITH THE DIVISION OF MAJOR GENERAL SIR JOHN LITTLER
IN THE ATTACK UPON THE ENEMY'S ENTRENCHED CAMP AT FEROZESHAH ON THE EVEN-
ING OF THE XXI OF DECEMBER WHEN AFTER A
SEVERE CONFLICT THIS POSITION WAS CARRIED AND THE VICTORY WAS ALREADY
SECURE IT WAS HIS SAD FATE BY THE SUDDEN ASSAULT OF TWO
SIKHS CONCEALED IN A VILLAGE UPON THE CAPTURED GROUND WHICH AS A
DUTY HE WAS THEN RECONNOITRING HE WAS FOUND ON THE FIELD OF BAT-
TLE THIRTY HOURS AFTER HE FELL AND WAS CONVEYED TO FEROZEPORE WHERE
AFTER A MONTH OF GREAT SUFFERING BORNE WITH TRUE FORTITUDE
HE DIED WITH THE RESIGNATION AND IN THE FAITH AND HOPE OF A CHRISTIAN
CAPTAIN EGERTON WAS GAZETTED IN ENGLAND AS MAJOR ON III APRIL
MDCCCXLVI BUT HE WAS THEN BEYOND THE REACH OF EARTHLY REWARDS
VISCOUNT HARDINGE THE GOVERNOR GENERAL OF INDIA IN A LETTER TO
HIS FAMILY DESCRIBED HIM AS ONE OF THE FINEST YOUNG OFFICERS IN
THE INDIAN ARMY FOR ABILITY VALOUR AND MORAL QUALITIES AS
RESPECTED PERSONALLY AS HE WAS ADMIRED PROFESSIONALLY
TO PRESERVE THE MEMORY OF HIS BRAVE AND BELOVED OFFICER AND
IN SYMPATHY WITH HIS FAMILY THIS CROSS WAS RAISED BY INHABITANTS
OF THE COUNTY AND CITY OF CHESTER A D MDCCCXLVII

== Appraisal ==
The monument was designated as a Grade II* listed building on 12 March 1986. Grade II* is the middle of the three grades of listing designated by English Heritage, and is granted to "particularly important buildings of more than special interest". The citation in the National Heritage List for England comments that this is "one of the more elaborate of the series of Victorian monuments inspired by the Eleanor Crosses".

== See also ==
- Grade II* listed buildings in Cheshire West and Chester
- Listed buildings in Little Budworth

== Notes and references ==
Notes

Citations

Sources

- Hartwell, Clare; Hyde, Matthew; Hubbard, Edward; Pevsner, Nikolaus (2011) [1971], Cheshire, The Buildings of England, New Haven and London: Yale University Press, ISBN 978-0-300-17043-6
- Morris, Edward; Roberts, Emma (2012), Public Sculpture of Cheshire and Merseyside (excluding Liverpool), Public Sculpture of Britain, vol. 15, Liverpool: Liverpool University Press, ISBN 978-1-84631-492-6
- Historic England, "Monument to John Francis Egerton (1310479)", National Heritage List for England
- Historic England, Listed Buildings
- National Recording Project, Queen Victoria Monument, archived from the original on 16 January 2014
