= Wion de Malpas Egerton =

British Royal Navy admiral

Vice-Admiral Wion de Malpas Egerton DSO
- Born: 16 April 1879
- Died: 1 January 1943 (aged 63) at sea
- Military career
- Allegiance: United Kingdom
- Branch: Royal Navy
- Rank: Vice-Admiral
- Awards: Distinguished Service Order

Vice-Admiral Wion de Malpas Egerton, DSO (16 April 1879 – 1 January 1943) was a British Royal Navy officer from the Egerton family, who served in World War I and was Deputy Director of Torpedoes and Mining from 1921 to 1922. Egerton was killed in the Second World War as commander of a North Atlantic convoy.

== Background ==
Egerton was born in the Punjab in 1879, the son of Indian Army officer (later Field Marshal) Sir Charles Egerton (1848–1921) by his wife Anna Wellwood. His grandfather was Major-General Caledon Egerton (1814–1874), a son of the ninth baronet of the Grey Egerton branch of the aristocratic Egerton family.

== Naval career ==
Egerton joined the Royal Navy in the 1890s, and was promoted to lieutenant on 15 April 1900. He was posted to the battleship HMS Centurion on 15 January 1901, then serving as flagship of Vice-Admiral Sir Edward Seymour on the China Station. In July and August 1902 he had a temporary posting to HMS Royal Sovereign, flagship to Sir Charles Frederick Hotham, Commander-in-Chief, Portsmouth, during the fleet review held at Spithead on 16 August 1902 for the coronation of King Edward VII. The following month he was posted to the torpedo school ship HMS Vernon, to qualify as torpedo lieutenant.

He was mentioned in despatches during the First World War, and in 1917 was awarded the Distinguished Service Order, being promoted to captain on 30 June that year. From January 1921 until December 1922 he was Deputy Director of Torpedoes and Mining. He was an Aide-de-Camp to King George V in 1928, and was promoted to flag rank as rear-admiral on 11 June 1928. He retired, and received the rank of vice-admiral on the Retired list on 4 January 1933, however he re-enlisted during the Second World War and was made Commodore of Convoys of the Royal Naval Reserve from May 1942.

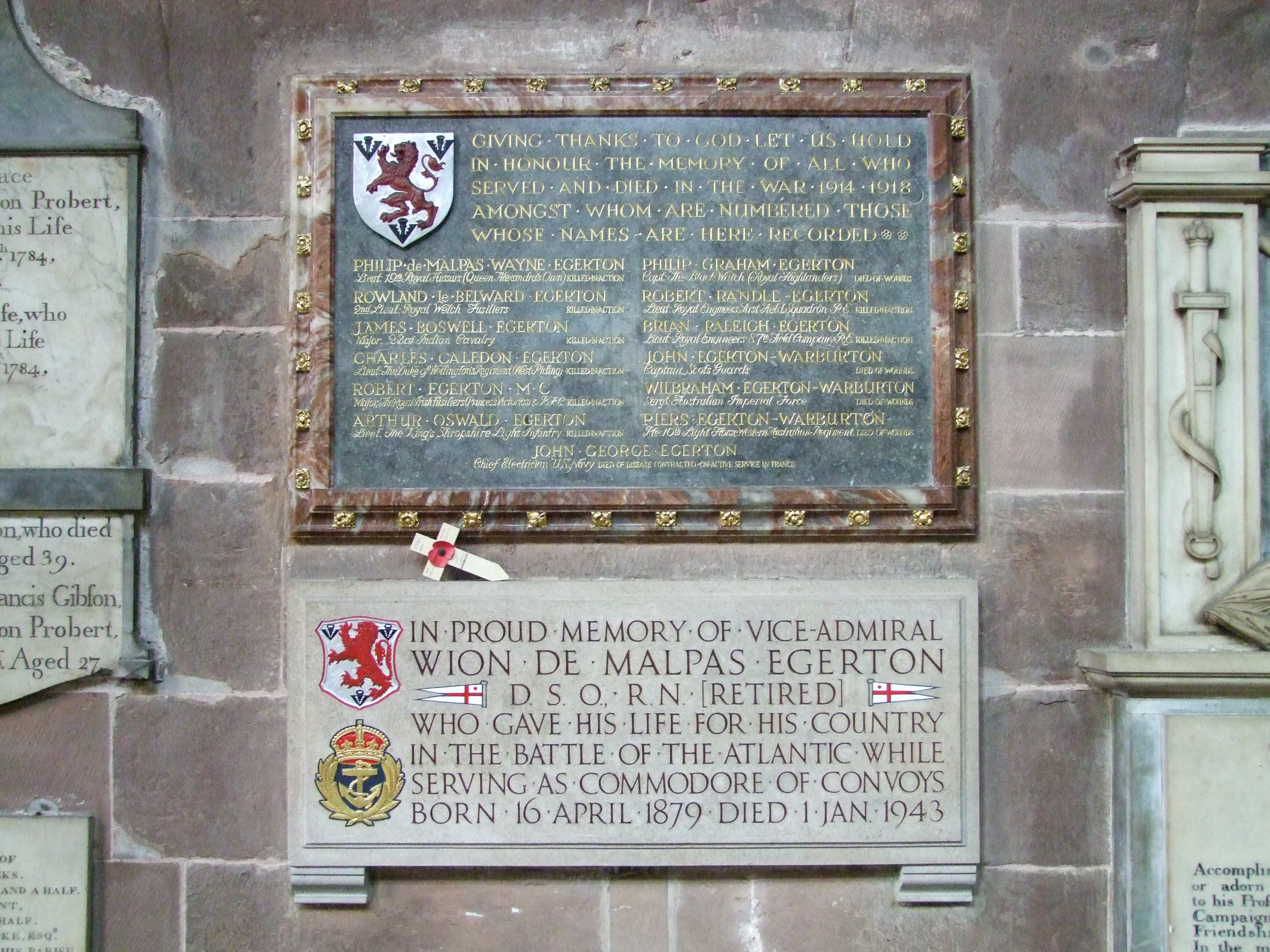
Egerton plaques in the south transept of Chester Cathedral: a memorial to family members killed during the war (top) and a memorial to Vice-Admiral Wion de Malpas Egerton (below)

Egerton was killed on 1 January 1943, while on board a ship that was torpedoed by a U-boat during World War II. He was convoy commodore of Convoy ON 154 aboard Empire Shackleton and had been picked up by HMS Fidelity after his ship was torpedoed, but died when the Fidelity was also torpedoed.

== Family ==
In 1913, Egerton married Anita David, the only daughter of Major Albert Rudolph David. She died in 1972. They had three children:

- Sir David Egerton (1914–2010), who succeeded his second cousin in the baronetcy in 2008.
- Penelope Egerton (1919–2004), who married Major John Michael de Burgh Ibberson
- Alison Egerton (1922), who married Lieutenant-Colonel Richard Boutcher Gregory

Military offices
Preceded by ?	Deputy Director of Torpedoes and Mining; 1921–22	Succeeded by Captain Henry Dalrymple Bridges
