= Francis Egerton =

Francis Egerton may refer to:

- Francis Egerton (Royal Navy officer) (1824–1895), British admiral and MP for Derbyshire East and for Derbyshire North-East
- Frank Egerton (Francis David Egerton, born 1959), British novelist

== Peers ==
- Francis Egerton, 3rd Duke of Bridgewater (1736–1803), peer and originator of British inland navigation
- Francis Henry Egerton, 8th Earl of Bridgewater (1756–1829), British eccentric, and supporter of natural theology
- Francis Egerton, 1st Earl of Ellesmere (1800–1857), British Chief Secretary for Ireland and Secretary at War, MP for Bletchingley, Sutherland and for South Lancashire
- Francis Egerton, 3rd Earl of Ellesmere (1847–1914), British author and soldier
- Francis Egerton, 7th Duke of Sutherland (born 1940), British peer and landowner
