= John Egerton =

John Egerton may refer to:

- Sir John Egerton (died 1614) (1551–1614), English MP for Staffordshire and Lichfield
- John Egerton, 1st Earl of Bridgewater (1579–1649), English peer and politician
- John Egerton, 2nd Earl of Bridgewater (1623–1686), English nobleman
- John Egerton, 3rd Earl of Bridgewater (1646–1701)
- John Egerton, 2nd Duke of Bridgewater (1727–1748), British peer and politician
- John Egerton, 7th Earl of Bridgewater (1753–1823), British soldier and Tory politician
- John Egerton, Viscount Alford (1812–1851), British Tory Member of Parliament
- John Egerton, 4th Earl of Ellesmere (1872–1944), British peer and soldier
- John Egerton, 6th Duke of Sutherland (1915–2000), his son
- John Egerton (bishop) (1721–1787), Anglican bishop
- John Egerton (journalist) (1935–2013), American journalist
- Sir John Grey Egerton, 8th Baronet (1766–1825), British MP for Chester
