= Bridget Egerton =

English religious writer

- Born: 1577
- Died: 28 July 1648 (aged 70–71)
- Writing career
- Genre: Theology

Bridget Egerton or Bridget, Lady Egerton (née Grey; 1577 – 28 July 1648) was an English religious writer.

== Life ==
She was born Bridget Grey in 1577. She was the only daughter of Jane Sibylla and Arthur Grey, 14th Baron Grey de Wilton.

Her brother -- Thomas, 15th and last Baron -- was arrested as a traitor and he would have been executed if he had not confessed on the day he was to have been killed. He was spared but spent the rest of his life in prison.

She wrote a series of essays on religious subjects based on references within the bible. The thrust of the essays was to belittle the Catholic faith. She came to notice when these were published in 1872 by the Chetham Society.

== Personal ==
Bridget married Sir Roland Egerton, 1st Baronet in 1620. He was the son of Sir John Egerton (known as "black Sir John"), of Egerton and Oulton, Cheshire, of Wrinehill, Staffordshire, and of Farthinghoe, Northamptonshire, and his first wife, Margaret Stanley. In 1625 after the death of "black Sir John" they moved to the family's property at Farhingho. Her husband died in 1646 and she was buried beside him in 1648.

- Sir John Egerton, 2nd Bt
- Sir Philip Egerton, of Oulton (d. 1698), married Catherine Conway (d. 1707)
  - Rev. Philip Egerton (1662-1727), married Frances Offley (d. 1738)
    - John Egerton (1697-1770), married Elizabeth Brock (d. 1756)
      - Philip Egerton (d. 1786), married his first cousin Mary Eyles (1745-1821), daughter of Francis Haskins Eyles-Stiles, 3rd Bt. and Sibella Egerton
        - Frances Egerton (1779-1862), married in 1805 Thomas Tarleton (1776-1836)
          - Susan Tarleton (1814-1879), married William Tomkinson (1790-1872)
    - Sibella Egerton (1711 - bef. 1763) married Sir Francis Haskins Eyles-Stiles, 3rd Bt.
