= Thomas Egerton =

Thomas Egerton may refer to:

- Thomas Egerton (mercer) (by 1521–c. 1597), Under-Treasurer of the Royal Mint
- Thomas Egerton (killed 1599) (1574–1599), MP for Cheshire
- Thomas Egerton, 1st Viscount Brackley (1540–1617), Lord Keeper 1596–1616
- Thomas Egerton, 1st Earl of Wilton (1749–1814)
- Thomas Egerton, 2nd Earl of Wilton (1799–1882)
- Thomas Egerton Hale, recipient of the Victoria Cross
- Thomas Egerton (publisher), publisher of Jane Austen's first three books
- Thomas Graham Egerton, British Army officer
