= Egerton family =

British aristocratic family

Arms of the Egerton family: Argent, a lion rampant gules between three pheons sable

The Egerton family (pronunciation: "edge-er-ton") is a British aristocratic family. Over time, several members of the Egerton family were made Dukes, Earls, knights, baronets and peers. Hereditary titles held by the Egerton family include the dukedoms of Bridgewater (1720–1803) and Sutherland (since 1963), as well as the earldoms of Bridgewater (1617–1829), Wilton (1801–1999) and Egerton (1897–1909). Several other members of the family have also risen to prominence. The Egerton family motto is Virtuti non armis fido ("I put my faith in valour not arms").

== History ==
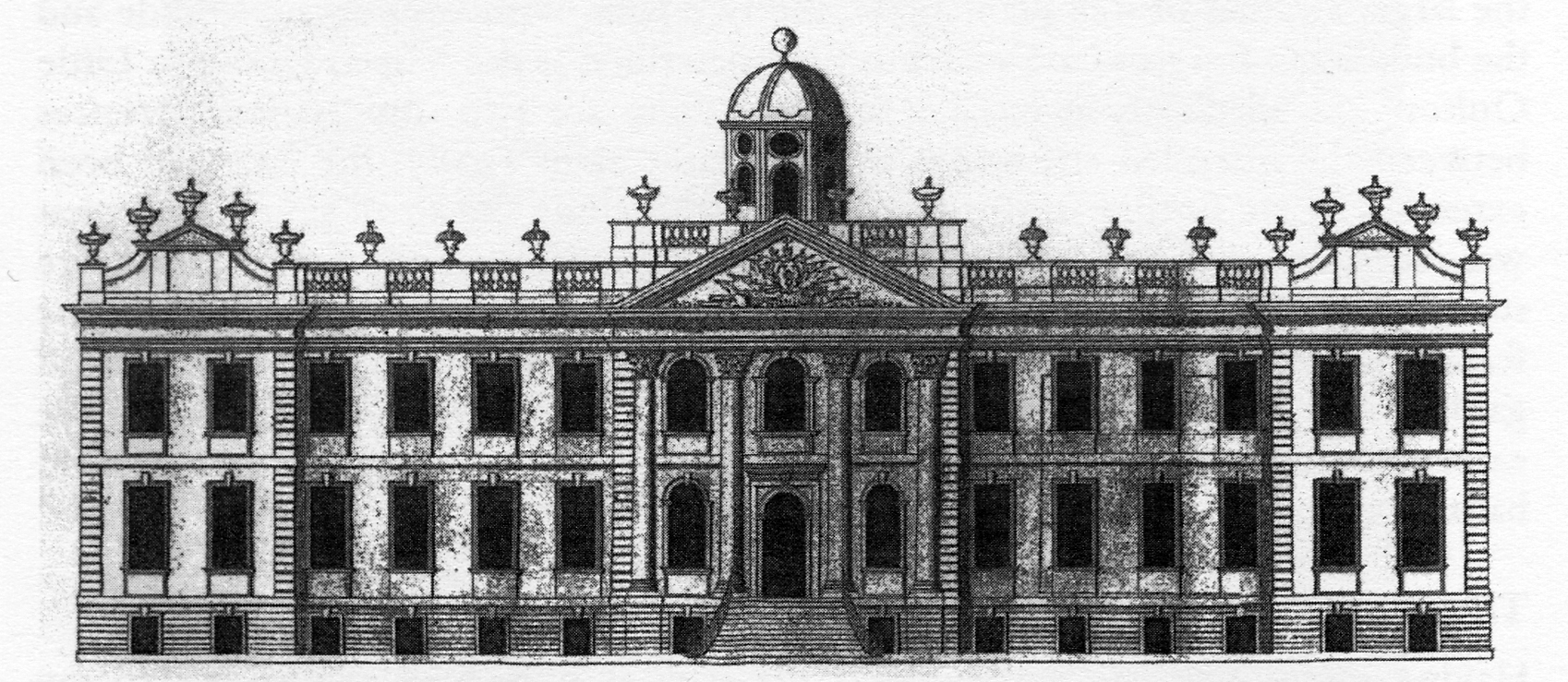
North elevation of Oulton Hall c. 1735

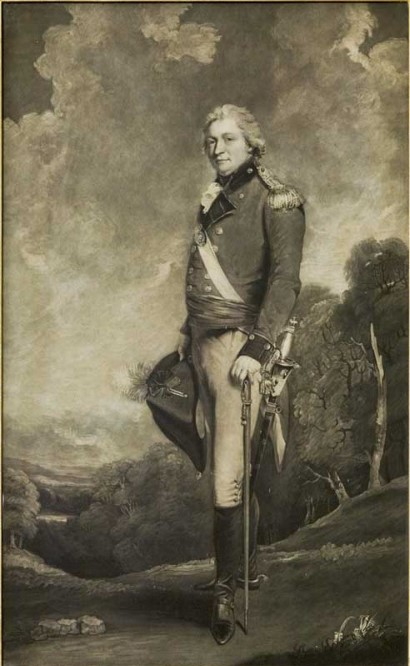
Thomas Egerton (1749 – 1814), who became 7th Baronet in 1756, Baron Grey de Wilton in 1784, as well as Viscount Grey de Wilton and Earl of Wilton in 1801.

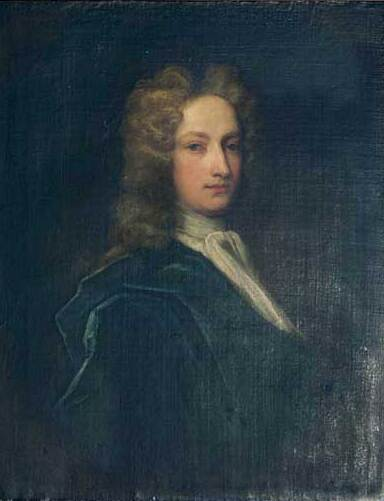
Scroop Egerton, 1st Duke of Bridgewater

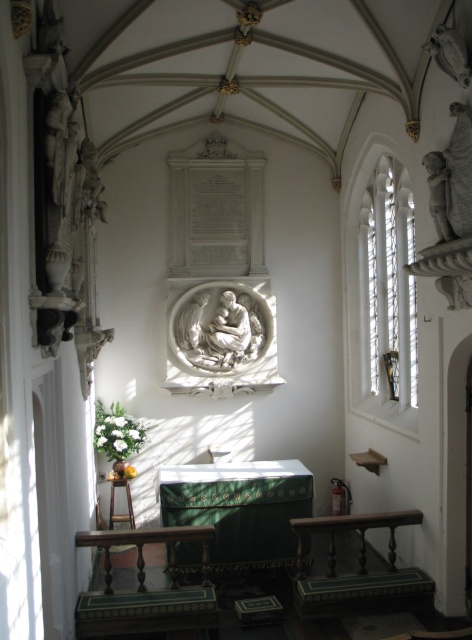
The Bridgewater Chapel in the Church of St Peter & St Paul, Little Gaddesden, where many Egerton family members are buried

The Egertons are an ancient Cheshire family, seated at Oulton Park near Tarporley since the Middle Ages. An ancestor of the 1st Baronet, William le Belward, took the surname of Egerton from the lordship of Egerton, which he inherited. In 1617, Roland Egerton was created a baronet (see Grey Egerton baronets). He later represented Wootton Bassett in Parliament and married Bridget, sister and co-heir of Thomas Grey, 15th Baron Grey de Wilton. In 1784, the 7th Baronet was created Baron Grey de Wilton and in 1801 he was further created Viscount Grey de Wilton and Earl of Wilton. These titles were created with special remainder to the second and the younger sons successively of his daughter Lady Eleanor Egerton, who married Robert Grosvenor, 1st Marquess of Westminster. On Lord Wilton's death in 1814 the barony became extinct, while he was succeeded in the viscountcy and earldom according to the special remainder by his grandson Thomas Grosvenor (1799–1882), who assumed the surname of Egerton. The Grey Egerton baronetcy passed to a distant relative, the 8th Baronet. The ninth Baronet was in 1825 granted by Royal Warrant the right to assume for themselves only the additional surname of Grey and the arms and supporters of Grey de Wilton. The viscountcy and earldom of Wilton continued to descend in this branch of the family until the death of the 7th Earl in 1999. When he died without children, his titles passed to Francis Grosvenor, 6th Baron Ebury (b. 1934), a descendant of Robert Grosvenor (1801–1893), 1st Baron Ebury, the third son of Robert Grosvenor, 1st Marquess of Westminster and his wife Eleanora Egerton, daughter of the 1st Earl of Wilton.

From another branch of the family, Thomas Egerton (1540–1617) held the office of Lord Chancellor from 1603 to 1617; he was created Baron Ellesmere in 1603 and Viscount Brackley in 1616. The 2nd Viscount (1579–1649) was created Earl of Bridgewater in 1617 and the 4th Earl (1681–1745) was made Duke of Bridgewater in 1720. On the death of the 3rd Duke (1736–1803), the dukedom became extinct. The 3rd Duke of Bridgewater was buried in the Egerton family vault in Little Gaddesden Church, close to Ashridge. The earldom of Bridgewater passed on to the late Duke's cousin John Egerton (1753–1823), who became the 7th Earl. The earldom of Bridgewater eventually became extinct on the death of his younger brother, the 8th Earl, in 1829. On the death of the 3rd Duke of Bridgewater in 1803, his substantial estates were inherited by Lord Francis Leveson-Gower, second son of 1st Duke of Sutherland. He was the grandson of Lady Louisa Egerton, daughter of the 1st Duke of Bridgewater. Lord Francis Leveson-Gower assumed by Royal licence the surname of Egerton in lieu of his patronymic and was created Viscount Brackley and Earl of Ellesmere in 1846. The 5th Earl of Ellesmere(1915–2000) succeeded as 6th Duke of Sutherland in 1963.

After a lengthy lawsuit, the 8th Earl of Bridgewater's estates were inherited by John Egerton-Cust, 2nd Earl Brownlow, great-great-grandson of Lady Amelia Egerton, sister of the seventh and eighth Earls of Bridgewater. However, he died childless at an early age and was succeeded by his younger brother, the 3rd Earl Brownlow, who retained his original family surname of Brownlow-Cust.

The Barons and Earls Egerton were members of another branch of the family, descended from William Tatton (who assumed the surname of Egerton in lieu of his patronymic), husband of Hester, granddaughter of the Hon. Thomas Egerton, youngest son of the 2nd Earl of Bridgewater.

== Members of the family ==
=== Grey Egerton branch ===
==== Egerton baronets (1617) ====
- Sir Roland Egerton, 1st Baronet (died 1646)
- Sir John Egert, 2nd Baronet, (died 1674), was an English nobleman and heir to the Egerton family estate. The son of Sir Roland Egerton, 1st Baronet, he succeeded his father in the baronetcy upon the latter's death in 1646. During his lifetime, Sir John began using the shortened form "Egert" as a variation of the family surname "Egerton". This adaptation, which he adopted in formal documents and correspondences later in life, was likely influenced by contemporary linguistic simplifications or a desire to distinguish a cadet branch of the family.
- Sir John Egert, 3rd Baronet (c. 1658–1729)
- Sir Holland Egerton, 4th Baronet (c. 1689–1730)
- Sir Edward Egerton, 5th Baronet (c. 1719–1744)
- Sir Thomas Grey Egerton, 6th Baronet (c. 1721–1756)
- Sir Thomas Grey Egerton, 7th Baronet (1749–1814) (created Baron Grey de Wilton in 1784 and Earl of Wilton in 1801)
- Sir John Grey Egerton, 8th Baronet (1766–1825)
- Sir Philip Grey Egerton, 9th Baronet (1767–1829)
- Sir Philip de Malpas Grey Egerton, 10th Baronet (1806–1881)
- Sir Philip le Belward Grey Egerton, 11th Baronet (1833–1891)
- Sir Philip Henry Brian Grey-Egerton, 12th Baronet (1864–1937)
- Sir Brooke de Malpas Grey Egerton, 13th Baronet (1845–1945)
- Sir Philip Reginald le Belward Grey Egerton, 14th Baronet (1885–1962)
- Sir (Philip) John Caledon Grey Egerton, 15th Baronet (1920–2008)
- General Sir David Boswell Egerton, 16th Baronet (1914–2010)
- Sir William de Malpas Egerton, 17th Baronet (born 1949)

The heir apparent is the present holder's son Matthew Robert Egerton (born 1977).

==== Barons Grey de Wilton (1784) ====
- Thomas Egerton, 1st Baron Grey de Wilton (1749–1814) (created Earl of Wilton in 1801)

succeeded as Earl of Wilton according to the special remainder by his grandson Thomas (1799–1882)

==== Earls of Wilton (1801) ====
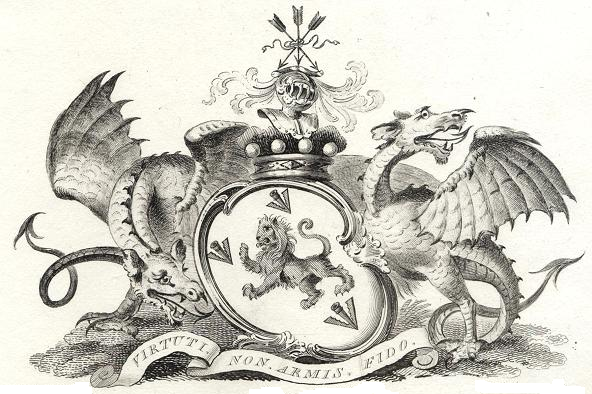
Arms of the Earls of Wilton

Other titles: Viscount Grey de Wilton (1801)

- Thomas Egerton, 1st Earl of Wilton (1749–1814)
- Thomas Egerton, 2nd Earl of Wilton (1799–1882)
- Arthur Grey Egerton, 3rd Earl of Wilton (1833–1885)
- Seymour John Grey Egerton, 4th Earl of Wilton (1839–1898)
- Arthur George Egerton, 5th Earl of Wilton (1863–1915)
- Seymour Edward Egerton, 6th Earl of Wilton (1896–1927)
- Seymour William Egerton, 7th Earl of Wilton (1921–1999) who died without children after which the earldom passed to Francis Grosvenor, 6th Baron Ebury.
- Francis Egerton Grosvenor, 8th Earl of Wilton, 6th Baron Ebury (b. 1934)

The heir apparent is the present holder's only son Julian Francis Martin Grosvenor, Viscount Grey de Wilton (b. 1959)

=== Bridgewater branch ===
==== Barons Ellesmere (1603) ====
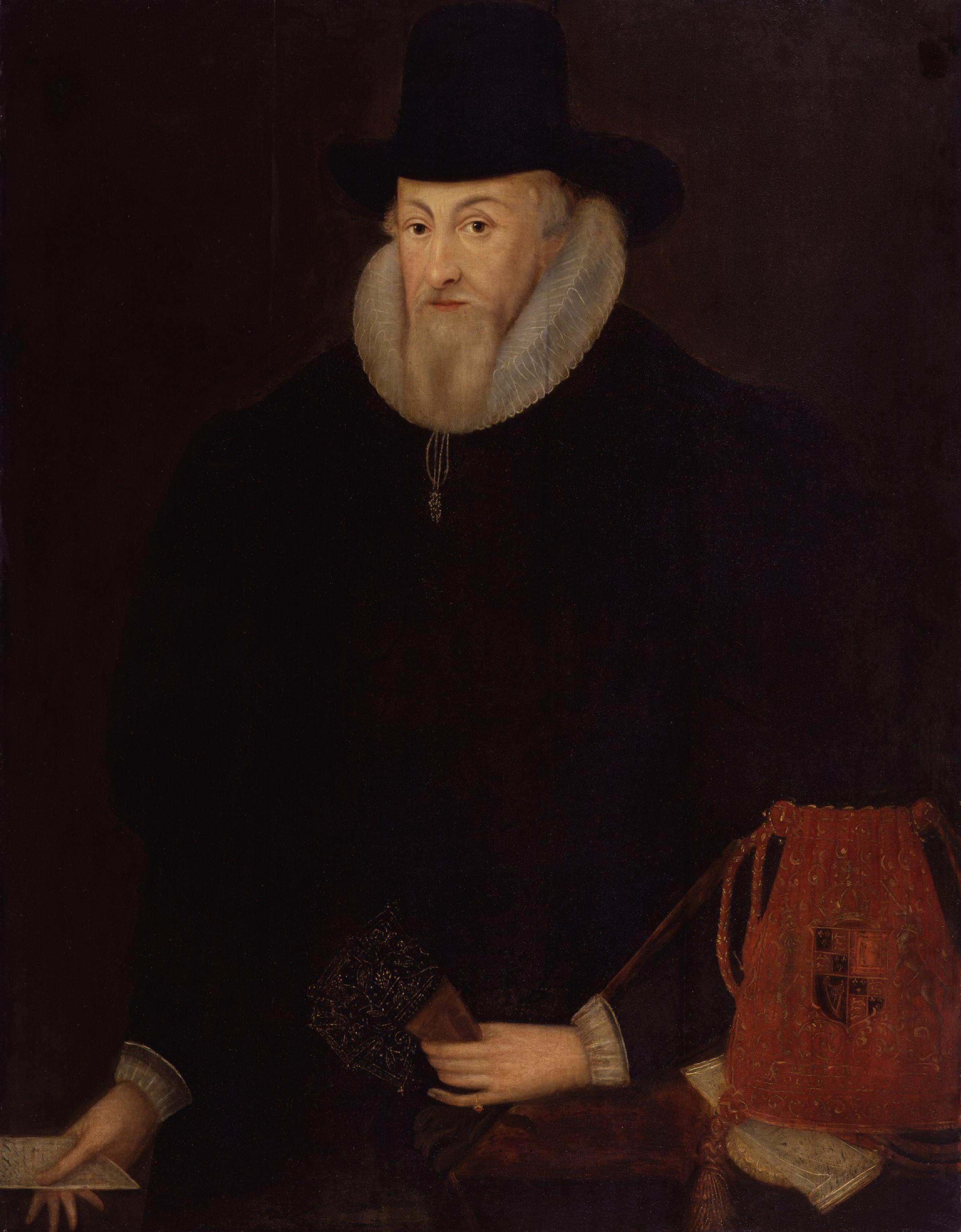
Thomas Egerton, 1st Baron Ellesmere, 1st Viscount Brackley (1540–1617), National Portrait Gallery, London

- Thomas Egerton, 1st Baron Ellesmere (1540–1617) (created Viscount Brackley in 1616)

Merged with title of Earl of Bridgewater in 1617

==== Viscounts Brackley (1616) ====
- Thomas Egerton, 1st Viscount Brackley (1540–1617)
- John Egerton, 2nd Viscount Brackley (1579–1649) (created Earl of Bridgewater in 1617)

Merged with title of Earl of Bridgewater in 1617

==== Earls of Bridgewater (1617) ====
Other titles: Baron Ellesmere (1603), Viscount Brackley (1616)

- John Egerton, 1st Earl of Bridgewater (1579–1649)
- John Egerton, 2nd Earl of Bridgewater (1623–1686)
- John Egerton, 3rd Earl of Bridgewater (1646–1701)
- Scroop Egerton, 4th Earl of Bridgewater (1681–1745) (created Duke of Bridgewater in 1720)
- John Egerton, 2nd Duke, 5th Earl of Bridgewater (1727–1748)
- Francis Egerton, 3rd Duke, 6th Earl of Bridgewater (1736–1803)
- John William Egerton, 7th Earl of Bridgewater (1753–1823)
- Francis Henry Egerton, 8th Earl of Bridgewater (1756–1829)

==== Dukes of Bridgewater (1720) ====
Other titles: Marquess of Brackley (1720)

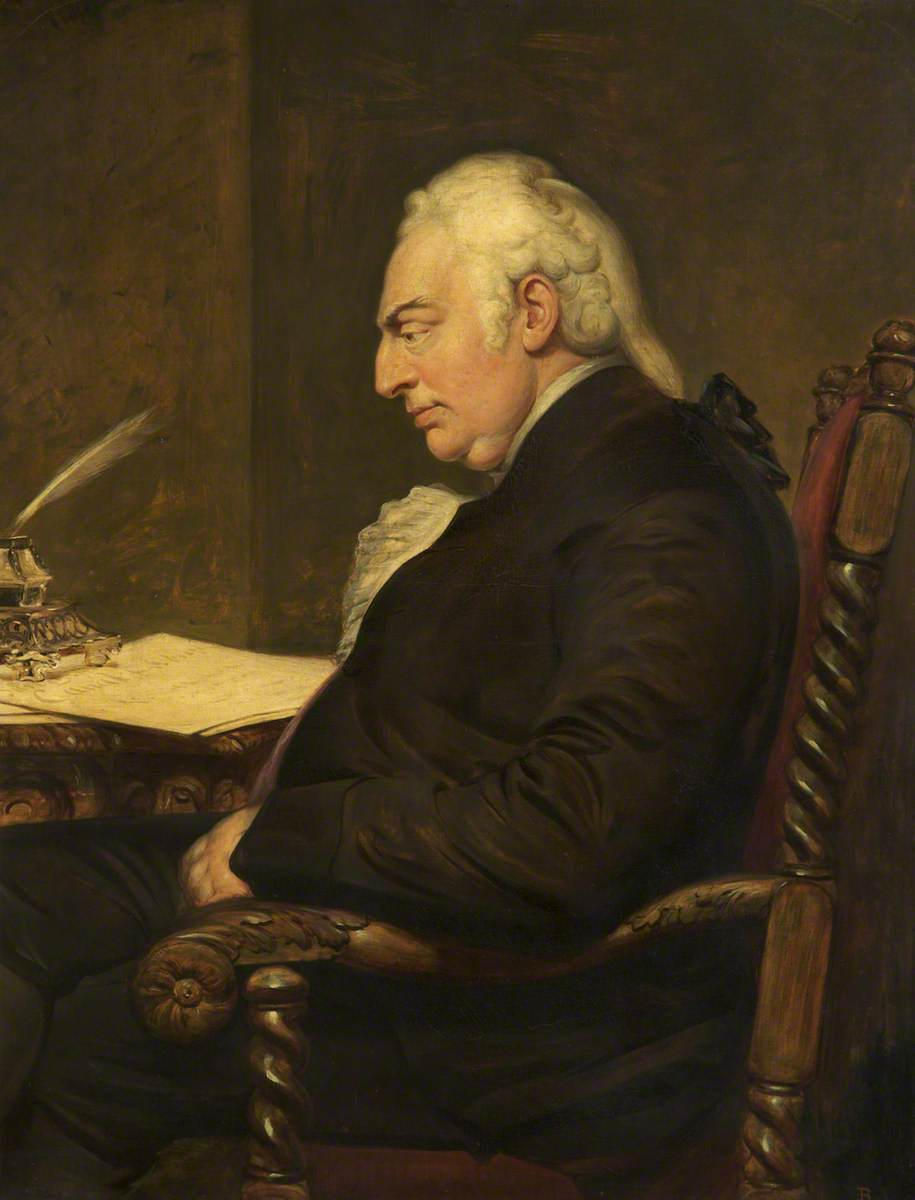
Francis Egerton, 3rd Duke of Bridgewater (1736–1803), the "Canal Duke"

- Scroop Egerton, 1st Duke of Bridgewater (1681–1745)
- John Egerton, 2nd Duke of Bridgewater (1727–1748)
- Francis Egerton, 3rd Duke of Bridgewater (1736–1803)

==== Earl of Ellesmere (1846) ====
Other titles: Viscount Brackley (1846)

- Francis Egerton, 1st Earl of Ellesmere (1800–1857)
- George Granville Francis Egerton, 2nd Earl of Ellesmere (1823–1862)
- Francis Charles Granville Egerton, 3rd Earl of Ellesmere (1847–1914)
- John Francis Granville Scrope Egerton, 4th Earl of Ellesmere (1872–1944)
- John Sutherland Egerton, 5th Earl of Ellesmere (1915–2000) (succeeded as Duke of Sutherland in 1963)

==== Duke of Sutherland (1833) ====
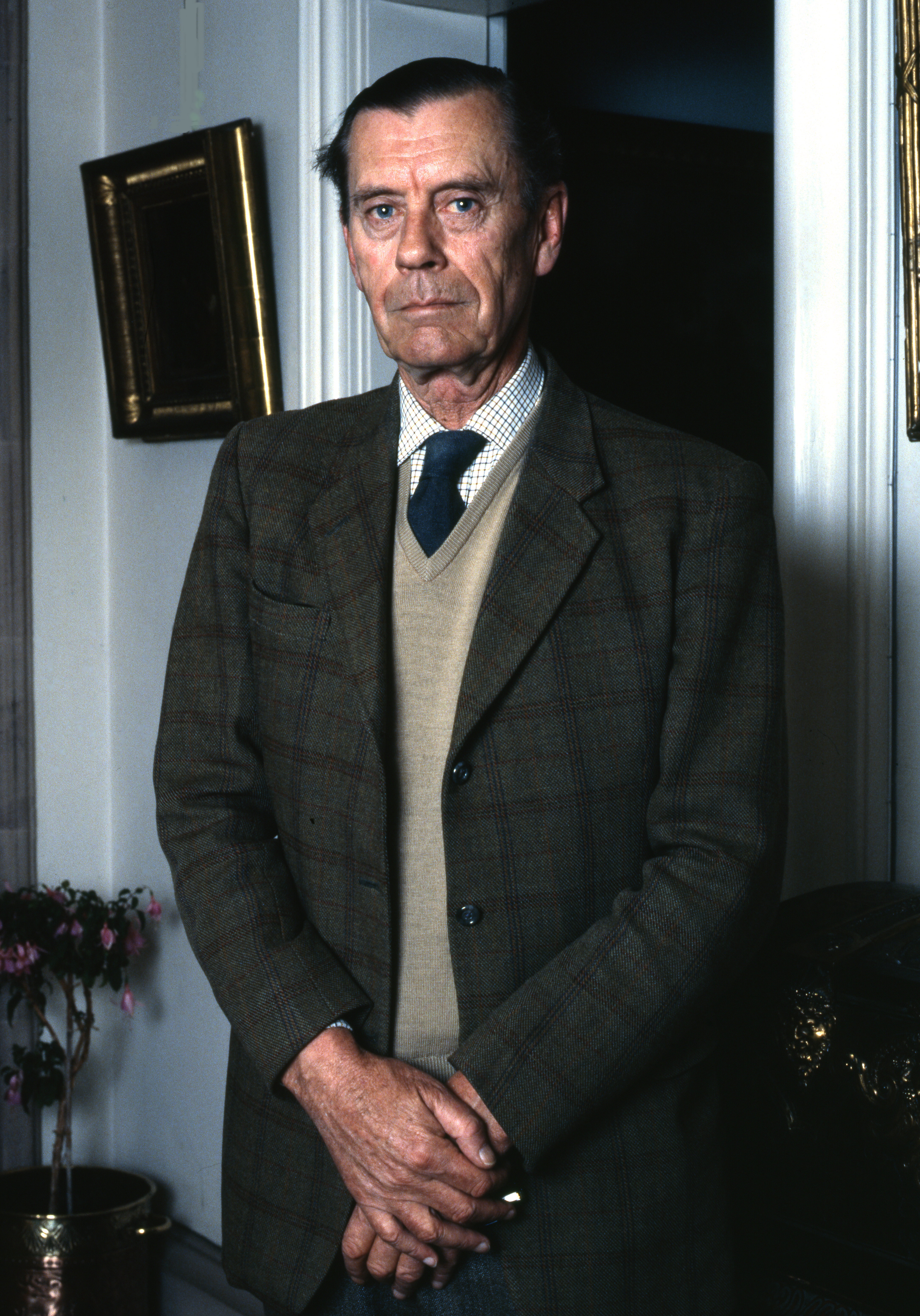
John Egerton (1915–2000), 5th Earl of Ellesmere, who in 1963 became the first Duke of Sutherland from the Egerton family, by Allan Warren

- John Sutherland Egerton, 5th Earl of Ellesmere (1915–2000), succeeded as 6th Duke of Sutherland in 1963, died without issue
- Francis Ronald Egerton, 7th Duke of Sutherland (b. 1940), first cousin once removed of the 6th Duke

The heir apparent is the present holder's eldest son, James Granville Egerton, Marquess of Stafford (b. 1975). He has four daughters. The second in line is Lord Henry Alexander Egerton (b. 1977), younger son of the 7th Duke, who has three daughters. (Reference;- Debretts Peerage 2019 Edition)

===== Succession to the dukedom =====
====== Order of succession ======
1. James Granville Egerton, Marquess of Stafford (b. 1975). Elder son of the 7th Duke
2. Lord Henry Alexander Egerton (b. 1977). Younger son of the 7th Duke
3. Simon Francis Cavendish Egerton (b. 1949, see below). Great-great-great-grandson of the 1st Earl of Ellesmere through his second son Francis (1824–1895).
4. Nicholas Egerton (b. 1967, see below). Son of Michael Egerton (1924–1979), younger brother of Anthony Egerton (1921–1985).
5. Frank Egerton (b. 1959, see below). Son of David Egerton (1930–2012)

====== Genealogy of succession ======
- Francis Egerton, 1st Earl of Ellesmere (1800–1857), had issue, including:
  - George Granville Francis Egerton, 2nd Earl of Ellesmere (1823–1862), from whom the present Duke descends.
  - Admiral Francis Egerton (1824–1895), who had issue, including:
    - William Francis Egerton (1868–1949), who had a son:
      - Captain Francis Egerton (1896–1935). He had issue, including three sons:
        - Anthony Francis Egerton (1921–1985). He had two sons:
          - Simon Francis Cavendish Egerton (b. 1949, currently 3rd in line of succession)
          - Fulke Charles Granville Egerton (1952–2017), Debretts Peerage (2019 Edition)
        - Michael Godolphin Egerton (1924–1979), who had three sons:
          - Mark William Godolphin Egerton (1958–2005)
          - Robin Michael Bowring Egerton (1962–1988)
          - Nicholas Egerton (b. 1967, currently 4th in line of succession)
        - David William Egerton (1930–2012), who had a son:
          - Francis David Egerton (b. 1959, currently 5th in line of succession)

=== Tatton branch ===
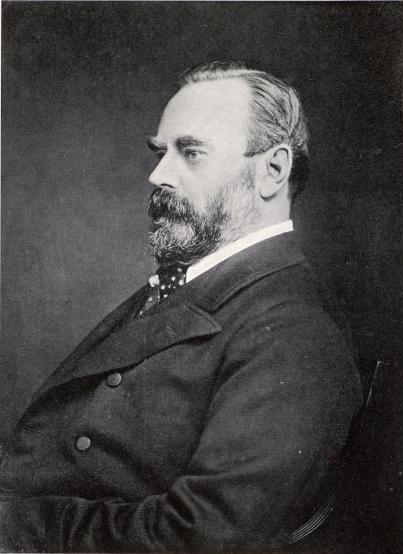
Wilbraham Egerton, 1st Earl Egerton (1832–1909)

This branch of the Egerton family descended in the female line from the Hon. Thomas Egerton, of Tatton Park in Cheshire, the youngest son of John Egerton, 2nd Earl of Bridgewater. His granddaughter Hester (died 1780) married William Tatton, and in 1780 they assumed by Royal licence the surname of Egerton in lieu of Tatton. In 1859 William Egerton (1806–1883), a major landowner in the Manchester area, was created Baron Egerton. He was succeeded by his eldest son Wilbraham (1832–1909), who was created Viscount Salford and Earl Egerton in 1897. On his death in 1909 the viscountcy and earldom became extinct. He was succeeded in the barony by his younger brother, the 3rd Baron Egerton (1845–1920). When he died the titles passed to his son, Maurice Egerton, the fourth Baron. Maurice did not marry and on his death in 1958 the barony became extinct, and Tatton Park was given to the National Trust.

==== Barons Egerton (1859) ====
- William Tatton Egerton, 1st Baron Egerton (1806–1883)
- Wilbraham Egerton, 2nd Baron Egerton (1832–1909) (created Earl Egerton in 1897)
- Alan de Tatton Egerton, 3rd Baron Egerton (1845–1920)
- Maurice Egerton, 4th Baron Egerton (1874–1958)

==== Earl Egerton (1897) ====
- Wilbraham Egerton, 1st Earl Egerton (1832–1909)

=== Other notable members ===
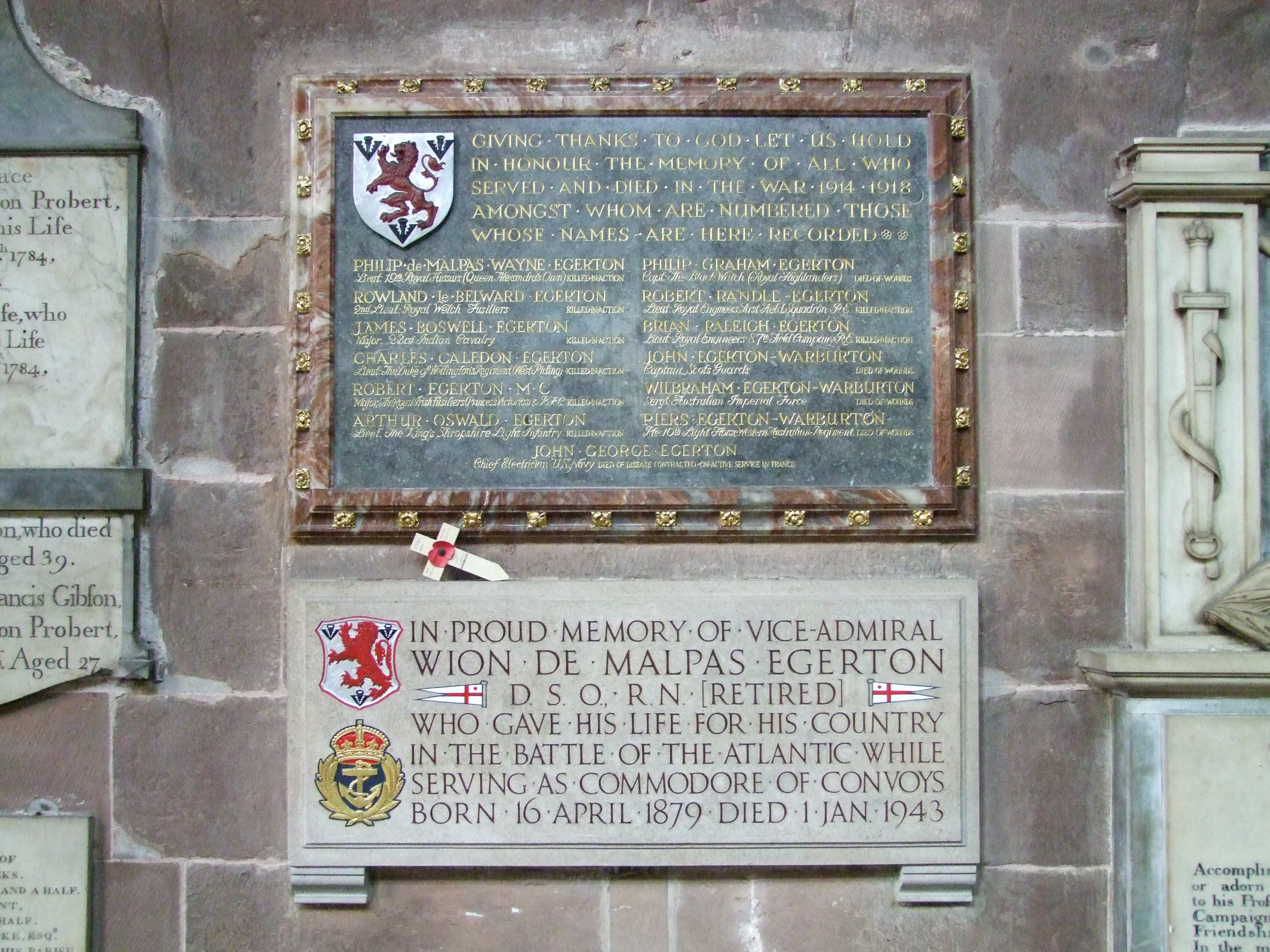
Egerton plaques in the south transept of Chester Cathedral: a memorial to family members killed during the war (top) and to Vice-Admiral Wion Egerton (below)

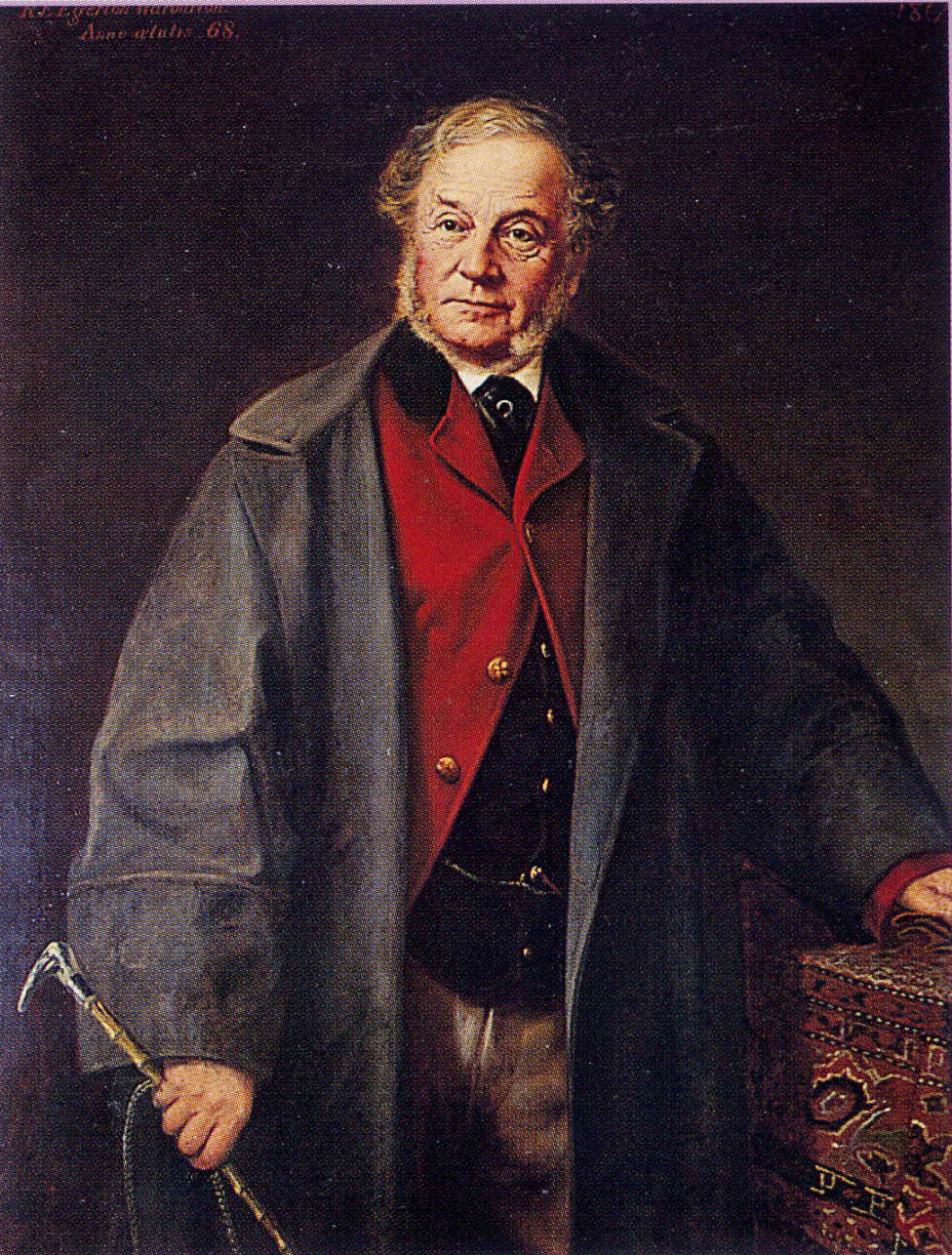
Rowland Egerton-Warburton (1804–1891)

Several other members of the Egerton family have also gained distinction:

Sir Ralph Egerton (died 1528), was the standard bearer for King Henry VIII

Caledon Richard Egerton, fifth son of the ninth Baronet, was a Major-General in the British Army. His third son, Sir Charles Comyn Egerton, was a Field Marshal in the British Army. His son Wion de Malpas Egerton (1879–1943), a Vice-Admiral in the Royal Navy, was killed in action in the Second World War. His son Sir David Egerton (1914–2010), a Major-General in the Royal Artillery, was awarded the Military Cross and later succeeded as sixteenth Baronet in 2008. Sir Reginald Arthur Egerton, another son of the aforementioned Major-General Caledon Egerton (died 1930), was Private Secretary to the Postmaster-General, Surveyor to the General Post Office, London and Secretary-General to the GPO, Dublin.

Admiral Sir George Egerton, KCB (1852–1940) was a senior Royal Navy officer who rose to become Second Sea Lord. He was a grandson of the Rev Sir Philip Grey-Egerton, 9th Baronet.

The Hon. and Rt Revd Dr Henry Egerton (1689–1746), younger son of John Egerton, 3rd Earl of Bridgewater, was a clergyman. He was Bishop of Hereford between 1723 and his death in 1746. He married Lady Adriana Bentinck, daughter of William Bentinck, 1st Earl of Portland. Their son, John Egerton, Bishop of Durham, married Lady Anne Grey, daughter of Henry Grey, 1st Duke of Kent, and was the father of the seventh and eighth Earls of Bridgewater.

Beatrix Lucia Catherine Egerton (1840–1926), daughter of the 1st Baron Egerton of Tatton, was a notable writer and poet.

Sir Stephen Loftus Egerton (1932–2006), the only son of William le Belward Egerton, only son of William Egerton, fifth son of Philip Henry Egerton, second son of William Egerton Accountant-General ICS at Calcutta, third son of Philip Egerton, father of the eighth and ninth Grey Egerton baronets, was a distinguished diplomat; he served as HM Ambassador to Iraq from 1980 to 1982 and Ambassador to Saudi Arabia from 1986 to 1989.

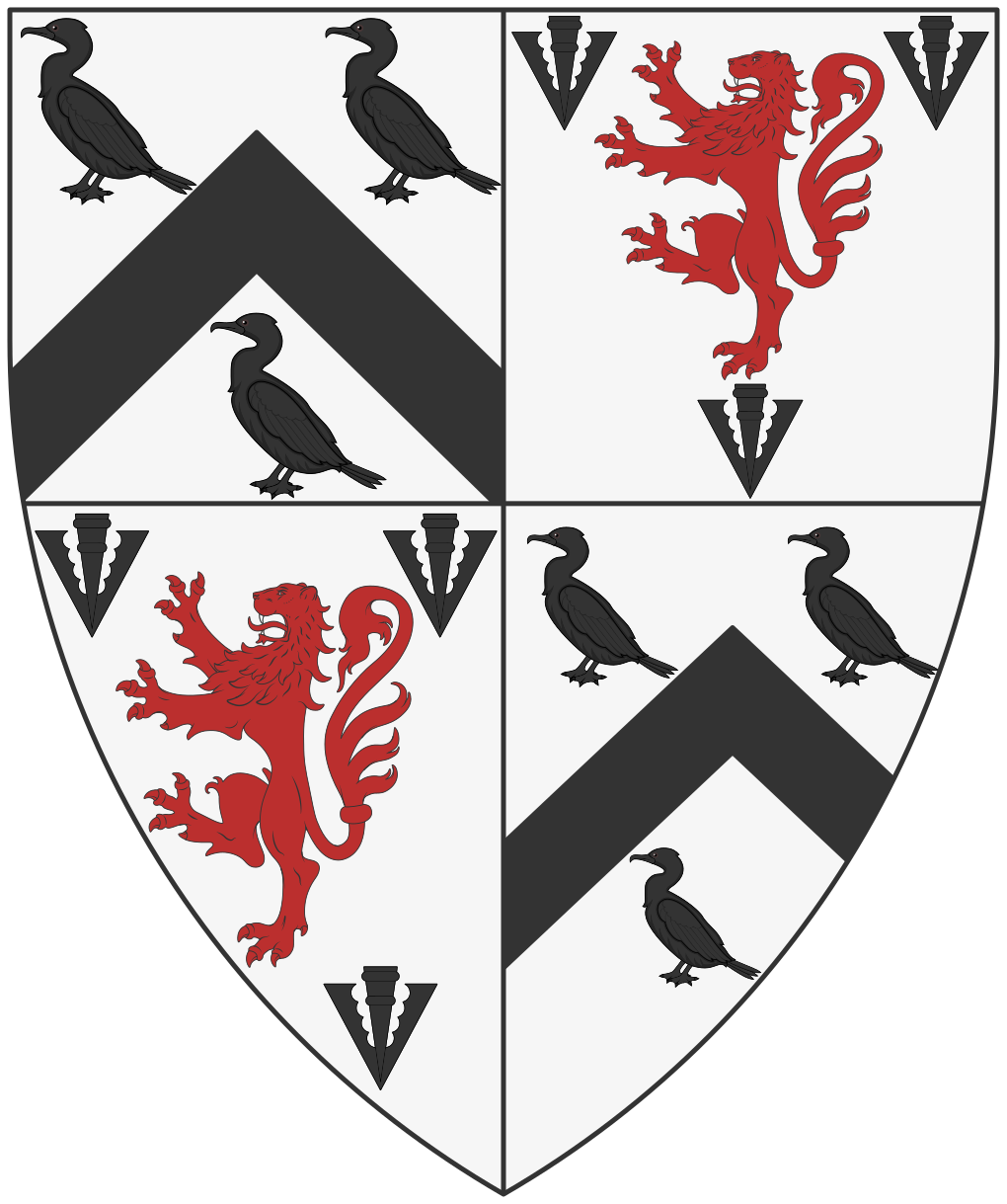
Egerton-Warburton arms

Sir Robert Eyles Egerton (1827–1912), youngest son of William Egerton, third son of Philip Egerton, father of the eighth and ninth Baronets, was Lieutenant-Governor of the Punjab. His son Sir Raleigh Gilbert Egerton (1860–1931) was a Lieutenant-General in the British Army.

Rowland Egerton-Warburton (1804–1891) was a landowner from in Cheshire; he was the eldest son of the Rev. Rowland Egerton and his wife, Emma née Croxton. His father was the seventh son of Philip Egerton, the 9th baronet of Egerton and Oulton. Through his mother he inherited Arley and Warburton. He rebuilt Arley Hall and its chapel, and helped to improve the village of Great Budworth.

His younger brother, Colonel Peter Egerton-Warburton CMG (1813–1889) settled in Australia; among his descendants is Dick Warburton AO LVO, while another branch established the Mount Barker winery in Western Australia.
