= Egerton, Cheshire =

Civil parish in Cheshire, England

Coordinates: 53.063°N 2.714°W

Egerton
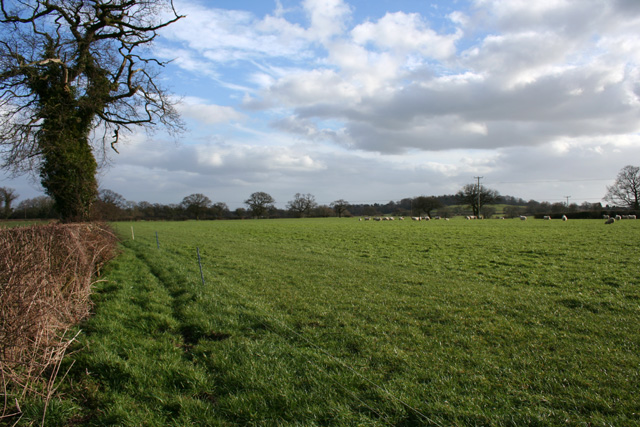
- Sheep pasture in the north of the civil parish

- Location within Cheshire
- Population: 81 (2001)
- OS grid reference: SJ522520
- Civil parish: Egerton
- Unitary authority: Cheshire East
- Ceremonial county: Cheshire
- Region: North West
- Country: England
- Sovereign state: United Kingdom
- Post town: MALPAS
- Postcode district: SY14
- Dialling code: 01829
- Police: Cheshire
- Fire: Cheshire
- Ambulance: North West
- UK Parliament: Chester South and Eddisbury

Egerton is a civil parish in the unitary authority of Cheshire East and the ceremonial county of Cheshire, England. A largely rural area, the parish includes the small settlement of Egerton Green (at SJ522520), which lies 3¾ miles to the north east of Malpas and 8 miles to the west of Nantwich, as well as Fairy Glen. The population is less than 100. Nearby villages include Bickerton, Bulkeley and No Man's Heath.

== History ==
In the Middle Ages, an ancestor of the Sir Roland Egerton, 1st Baronet, William le Belward, took the surname of Egerton from the lordship of Egerton, Cheshire, which he inherited. His descendants, the Egerton family, include the dukes of Bridgewater and Sutherland.

== Governance ==
Egerton is administered jointly with Bickerton by the Bickerton & Egerton Parish Council. From 1974 the civil parish was served by Crewe and Nantwich Borough Council, which was succeeded on 1 April 2009 by the unitary authority of Cheshire East. Since 2024 Egerton has been within the parliamentary constituency of Chester South and Eddisbury which is represented by Aphra Brandreth.

== Geography ==
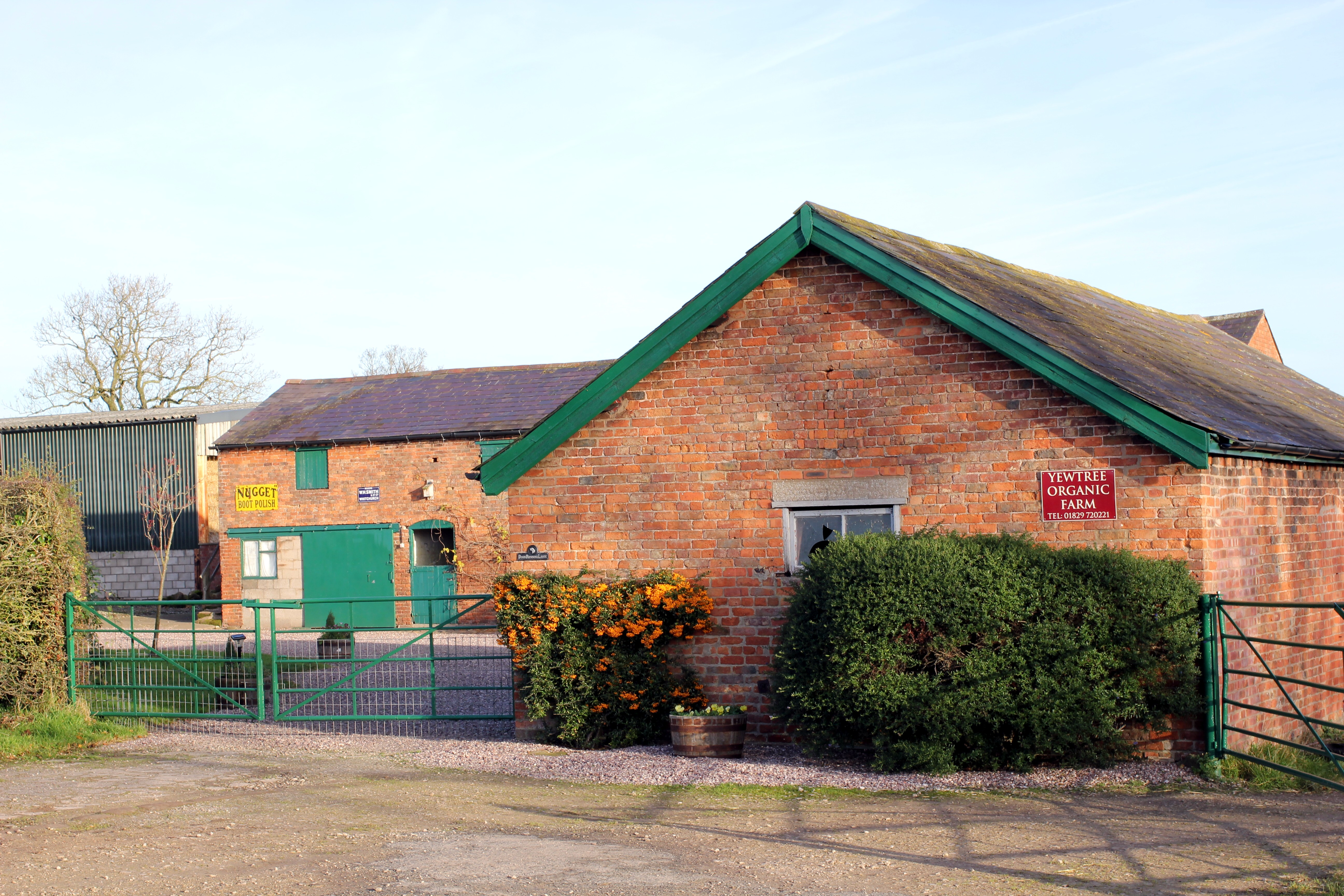
Yew Tree Organic Farm, Egerton Green

Egerton is predominantly flat, with an elevation of around 100 metres. Bickerton Road runs through the north, connecting Bickerton School with the A49, and a second lane connects Bickerton Road with the A41. National Cycle Routes 45 and 70 follow the lanes. Bickley Brook runs broadly north–south through the parish. There is a small area of woodland near Egerton Bank Farm in the south of the civil parish.

== Demography ==
According to the 2001 Census, the parish had a population of 81. At the 2011 Census the population remained less than 100. This represents a decline from the population of 1851; historical population figures are 103 (1801), 127 (1851), 113 (1901) and 97 (1951).

== Landmarks ==
The parish contains one listed building, the remains of a chapel to the west of Egerton Hall, which was demolished in 1760. The chapel dates from the 14th century, and the remains consist of three sandstone walls, which contain two windows.

== Education ==
There are no schools within the civil parish. Egerton falls within the catchment areas of Bickerton Holy Trinity CE Primary School in Bickerton and Bishop Heber High School in Malpas.
