= Charles Chandler Egerton =

English surgeon (1798–1885)

Charles Chandler Egerton (1798–1885) was an English surgeon.

== Life ==
Egerton was born at his father's vicarage of Thorncombe in Dorset in April 1798, and received his medical education at the then united hospitals of St. Thomas's and Guy's. In 1819 he became a member of the College of Surgeons. Four years later he was appointed by the East India Company assistant-surgeon on the Bengal establishment to practise as an oculist, and especially to take charge of those Indo-European lads at the lower orphan school who had contracted disease of the eyes. He dealt successfully with the epidemic there, and during his stay in India he held the first position as an oculist at the Eye Hospital, which was established under his own immediate care, and afterwards at the Medical College Hospital.

He was appointed the first surgeon at the Calcutta Medical College Hospital, and held that position until he retired from the service. The establishment of the college for teaching the "natives" anatomy by actual dissection was mainly due to his exertions. Early in 1817 he left India, and, retiring from practice, resided at Kendal Lodge, Epping, until his death, which took place there in May 1885, at the age of eighty-seven.
