= Stephen Egerton =

Stephen Egerton may refer to:

- Stephen Egerton (priest) (1555?–1621?), English clergyman
- Stephen Egerton (diplomat) (1932–2006), British Ambassador to Iraq, Saudi Arabia and Italy
- Stephen Egerton (guitarist) (born 1964), American guitarist
