= Daniel Thomas Egerton =

British landscape painter (1797–1842)

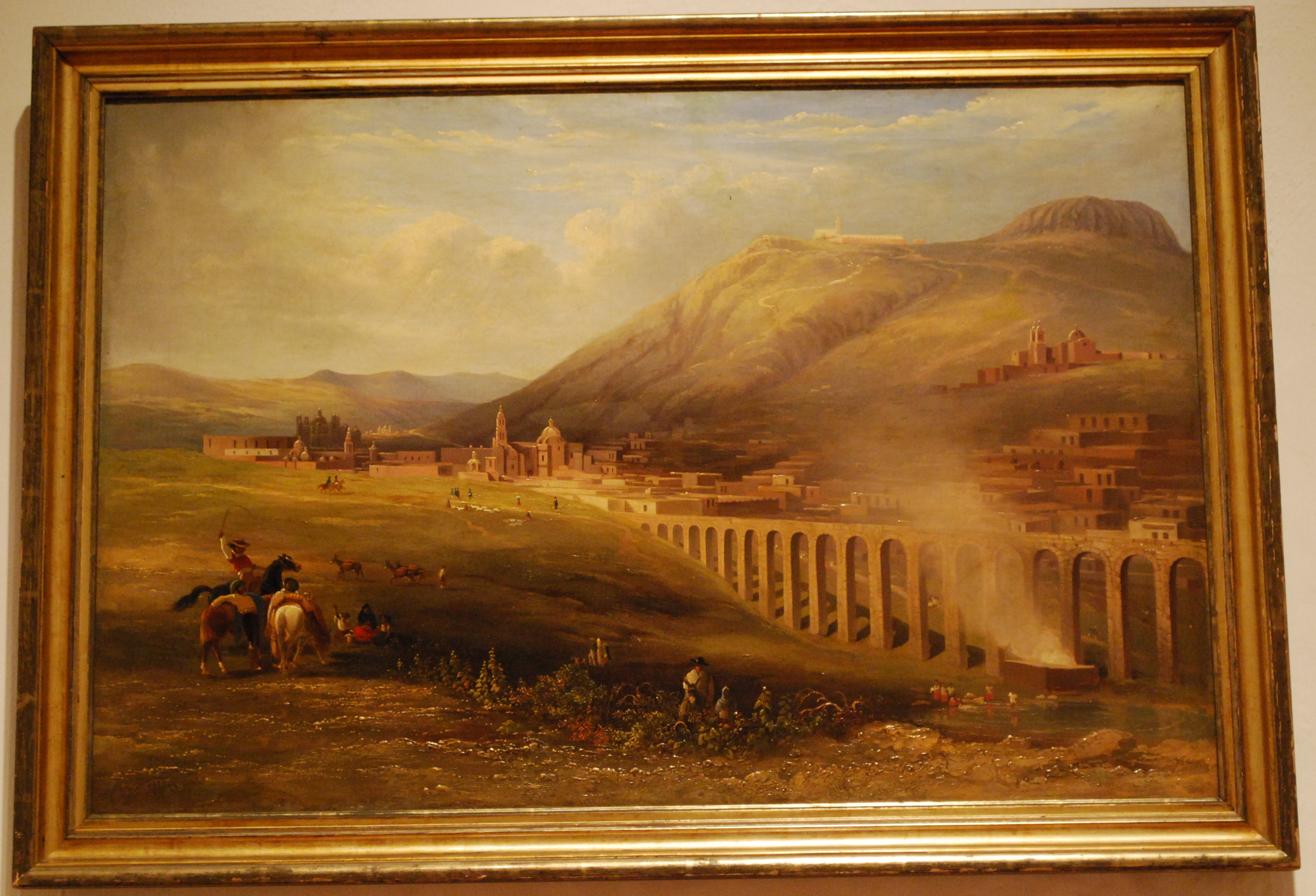
The aqueduct of Zacatecas, 1838, now in the Franz Mayer Museum

Daniel Thomas Egerton (1797– 27 April 1842) was a British landscape painter who spent much of the later part of his life in Mexico.

== Biography ==
Egerton was one of the original members of the Society of British Artists, where he exhibited in the years 1824 to 1829, and in 1838 to 1840.

He spent much of the later part of his life in Mexico, and in 1840 published Egerton's Views in Mexico, a portfolio of lithographs described in the subtitle as "being a Series of Twelve Coloured Plates, executed by himself from hs Original Drawings, accompanied with a short Description".

Having abandoned his family in England, Egerton returned to Mexico in 1841 with Alice Edwards, the teenaged daughter of another British painter. He and the eight-month pregnant Alice were murdered in the village of Tacubaya (present day Mexico City), Mexico, where they had rented a house, on 27 April 1842. Egerton was carrying large amounts of money, and both he and Alice were wearing jewelry which was untouched, although the murder was attributed to a robbery. British diplomatic pressure to solve the crime led to the arrest of three local petty thieves, two of whom were hanged, and one of whom was allowed to escape from prison. There has been speculation that Egerton's alleged involvement in fraudulent land sales in Texas, his ties to a Masonic order, or an unknown jealous lover of Alice was behind the killing.

A painting of The Ravine of the Desert (The Valley of Mexico) was sold at Christie's New York in 2007 for $384,000.

His painting The Valley of Mexico (1837) is in the British Government Art Collection.
