= Arthur Grey, 14th Baron Grey de Wilton =

English noble (1536–1593)

Arthur Grey KG

14th Baron Grey de Wilton
- In office 1562–1592

Lord Deputy of Ireland
- In office 1580–1582

Personal details
- Born: 1536
- Died: 14 October 1593 (aged 56–57)
- Spouse(s): Dorothy la Zouch; Jane Sibella Morrison
- Children: 4, including Thomas Grey, 15th Baron Grey de Wilton, and Bridget, Lady Egerton
- Parents: William Grey, 13th Baron Grey de Wilton (father); Mary Somerset (mother)

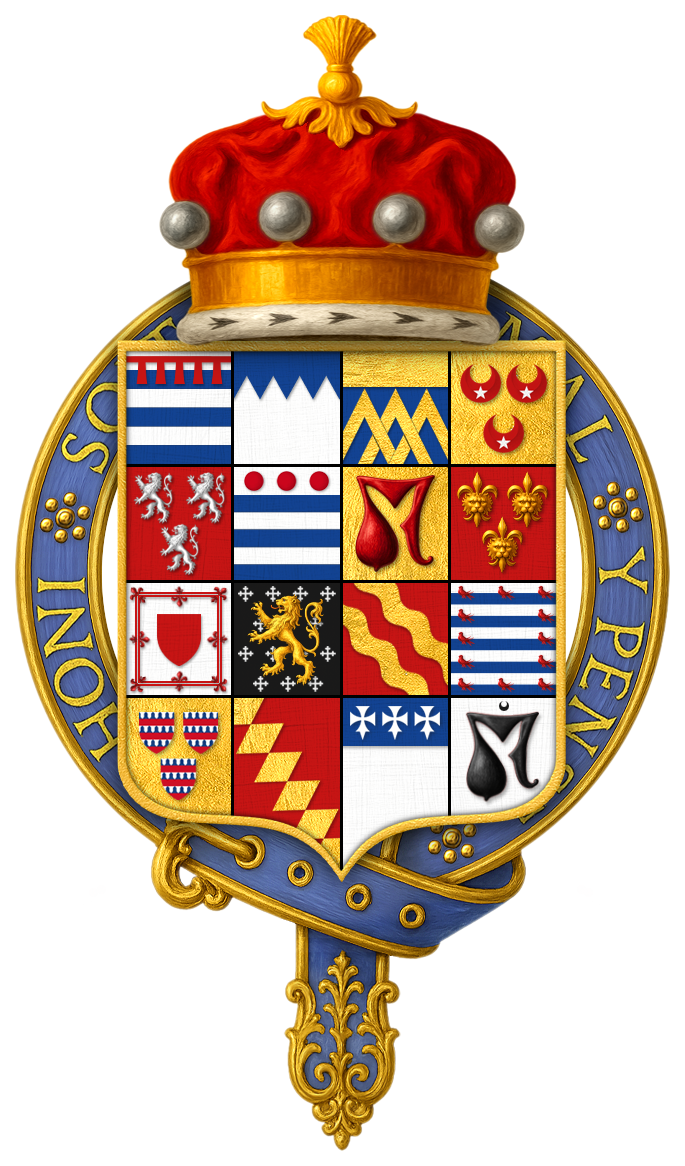
Quartered arms of Arthur, 14th Baron Grey de Wilton, KG

The Rt Hon. Arthur Grey, 14th Baron Grey de Wilton, KG (1536–1593), was a baron in the Peerage of England. Lord Grey de Wilton is now largely remembered for his memoir of his father, for participating in the last defence of Calais (1558), and for his involvement in the massacre after the Siege of Smerwick (1580) on Corca Dhuibhne in County Kerry. He served as Lord Deputy of Ireland from 1580 until 1582.

== Life ==
Arthur Grey was the eldest son of The 13th Baron Grey de Wilton and Mary, daughter of The 1st Earl of Worcester. He was a Knight and he was recorded as being Lord Lieutenant of Buckinghamshire on two separate occasions, in both 1569 and 1587, though it is not recorded if he held that title for all the years in between. He probably went with his father to Guisnes in 1553; certainly, he was there when the French declared war in 1557; his eyewitness account of his father's last desperate defence of Guisnes, after Calais itself has fallen, remains the best source for the episode. Like his father he became a hostage but was ransomed a year later. He succeeded his father as 14th Baron in 1562; the family fortune was by then much reduced by the heavy ransom required to free his father. Elizabeth I, however, restored the property forfeited by his father for his part in the Lady Jane Grey affair.

In 1580, he recruited a force of 6,000 and was sent as Lord Deputy of Ireland to quell the Second Desmond Rebellion, replacing the notoriously brutal Sir William Pelham. His first main encounter was when he led an army of about 3,000 in the Battle of Glenmalure, County Wicklow in August, where his army was routed by Fiach McHugh O'Byrne, with casualties of 800. Later in the same year, he led a force of 800 to Ard na Caithne (Smerwick) in County Kerry where he massacred 600 Irish, Italian and Spanish troops who had already surrendered, a notorious incident known as the Siege of Smerwick. According to some versions of this event, Lord Grey de Wilton promised the garrison their lives in return for their surrender, a promise which he broke – this resulted in the Irish proverb 'Grey's faith'.

By 1582, the rebellion was in its last throes and he was recalled to England, leaving Munster devastated by famine. He had been largely successful in restoring order, but the justice of some of his actions was criticised, including the Smerwick massacre, and the hanging of the former Chief Justice, Nicholas Nugent, on what seems to have been no more than a suggestion that he had been complicit in the Desmond Rebellion.

== Marriage and issue ==
Lord Grey first married Dorothy, daughter of Richard, Lord Zouche. He secondly married, after 1572, Jane Sibella Morrison, who died in July 1615 and whose last will was dated of 6 March 1614/1615 and probated on 14 July 1615. She naturalized as an English subject in 1575/1576, and was the widow of Edward Russell, Baron Russell, whom she married c. 1571; he died before June 1572 without issue and intestate (his estate was administered on 30 June 1572) and was buried at Chenies, Buckinghamshire, son of Francis Russell, 2nd Earl of Bedford and Margaret St John.

Jane's parents were Sir Richard Morrison of Cashiobury, Hertfordshire (d. Strasbourg, 17 March 1556), and Bridget Hussey (c. 1526 – 13 January 1600/1601, bur. Watford, Hertfordshire, will dated 2 June 1600, probated 12 January 1600/1601), who married secondly before 1563 Henry Manners, 2nd Earl of Rutland, without issue, and thirdly, as his second wife Francis Russell, 2nd Earl of Bedford on 25 June 1566, also without issue. Bridget was a daughter of John Hussey, 1st Baron Hussey of Sleaford by his second wife, Lady Anne Grey.

Arthur and Jane were the parents of Thomas Grey, 15th Baron Grey de Wilton, attainted for treason in 1603. Bridget, Lady Egerton was their only surviving daughter.

== Grey as author ==
Not long after his father's death, Lord Grey de Wilton wrote an affectionate memoir of him, Commentary on the Services and Charges of William Lord Grey de Wilton, which was not published until the nineteenth century. It deals mainly with his father's military campaigns in Scotland and France, and has been highly praised by historians for the vivid first-hand account of the last days of English rule in Calais and Guisnes.

Political offices
Preceded by Henry Sidney	Lord Deputy of Ireland; 1580–1582	Succeeded by John Perrot
Preceded by The Earl of Bedford	Lord Lieutenant of Buckinghamshire; 1569, c.1578–1593	Succeeded by Sir John Fortescue
Preceded by Not known	Lord Lieutenant of Buckinghamshire; 1569, 1586–1593	Succeeded by Not known
Peerage of England
Preceded by William Grey	Baron Grey de Wilton; 1562–1592	Succeeded by Thomas Grey
