= Little Budworth =

Village and civil parish in Cheshire, England

Coordinates: 53.183°N 2.602°W

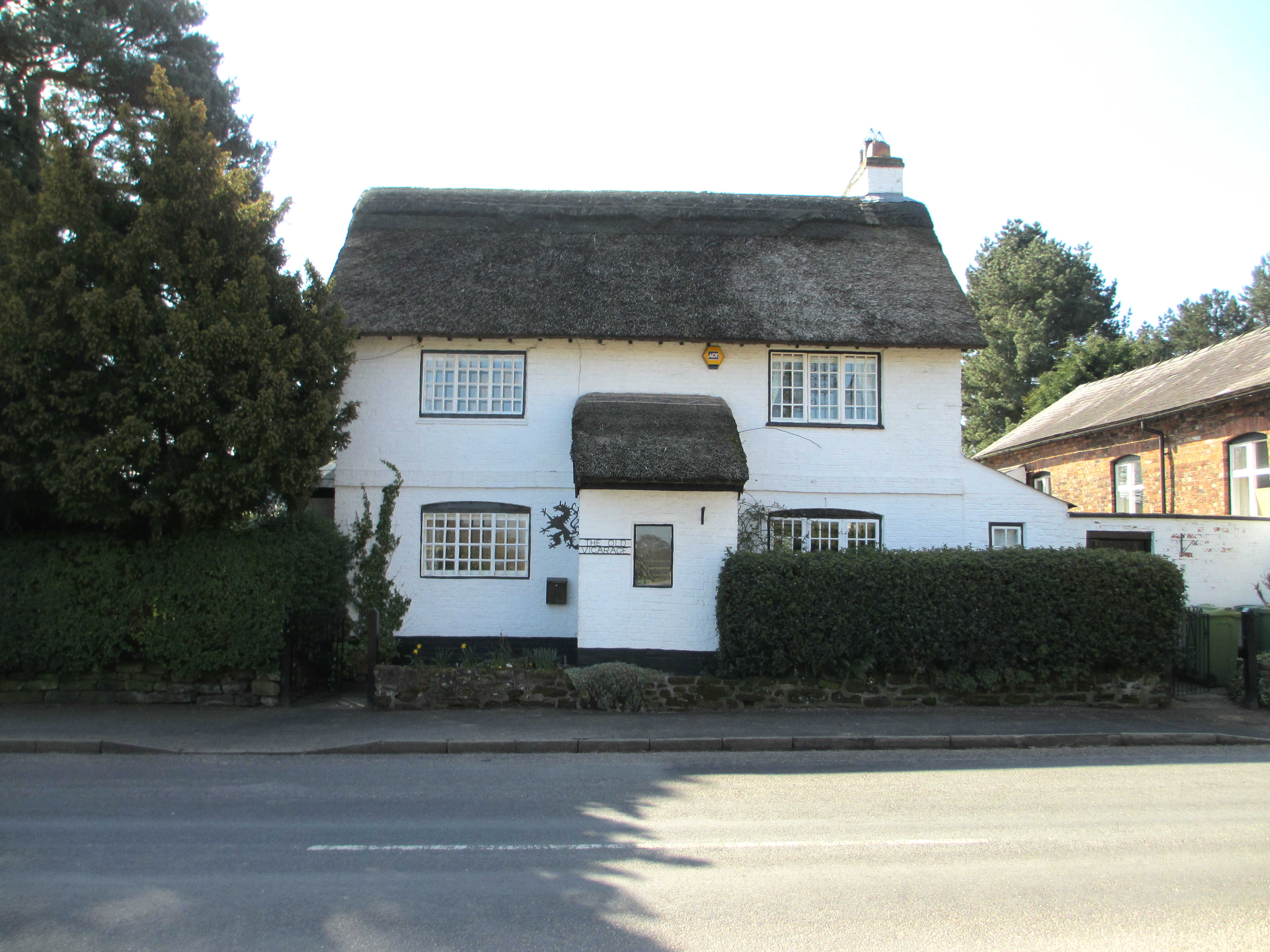
- The former vicarage, Little Budworth

- Location within Cheshire
- OS grid reference: SJ598653
- Civil parish: Little Budworth
- Unitary authority: Cheshire West and Chester
- Ceremonial county: Cheshire
- Region: North West
- Country: England
- Sovereign state: United Kingdom
- Post town: TARPORLEY/WINSFORD
- Postcode district: CW6, CW7
- Dialling code: 01829
- Police: Cheshire
- Fire: Cheshire
- Ambulance: North West
- UK Parliament: Chester South and Eddisbury

Little Budworth is a civil parish and village between Winsford and Chester, in the unitary authority of Cheshire West and Chester and the ceremonial county of Cheshire, England. The population of the civil parish taken at the 2011 census was 594. It is primarily known as the location of the Oulton Park motor racing circuit.

The village is about 3 miles from Winsford and Tarporley, 14 miles to Chester City Centre, 8 miles to Northwich and 17 miles to Warrington with nearby rail connection along the Mid-Cheshire Line set in rolling English countryside and forest.

== History ==
As the Romans settled in mid-Cheshire they explored Delamere Forest for food and discovered underground salt in the area. The transport of salt led to roads being created in an otherwise wild area. A settlement was founded in this open space by a Viking, Bodeur. The open space was called a 'wirth'. In the Domesday Book the village appeared as 'Bodeaurde' and is described as a 'waste' with woodland 'one league long and half a league wide' and land enough for two ploughs.

Between 1153 and 1160 the manor was granted by the Third Earl of Chester to Robert le Grosvenor whose descendant held the village for Edward the First. Certain lands remained in the ownership of the Grosvenors. In the reign of Henry VIII it passed to the ancestors of the Earl of Shrewsbury.

In 1860 the village was known as Budworth-in-the-Frith. There was a school known as Lady Egerton's School.

== St Peter's Church ==
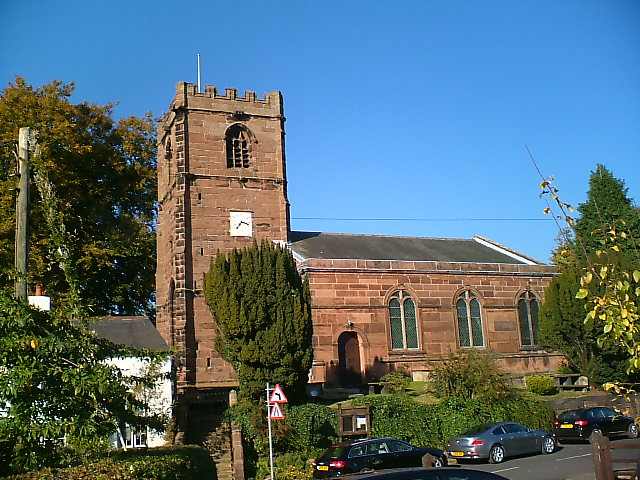
St Peter's Church, Little Budworth

The first record of a church in Little Budworth dates from 1190 when it was mentioned in conjunction with the parish of Over, Winsford. In 1526 Hugh Starky of Oulton directed that he should be buried in Little Budworth and left money to the church.

The 'free chapel of Budworth le Frith, within the Parish of Over', is mentioned in a charter of 1547 endowing the Bishopric of Chester, when is belonged to the nunnery of St Mary, Chester.

In 1798 the church was rebuilt (except for the tower and north wall) by a bequest from Ralph Kirkham (a rich merchant of Chester and the son of a farmer in Little Budworth, educated at Lady Egerton's School). The church was restored by the Colonel of Egerton in 1919 and the window commemorating the Egerton twins killed in the war was placed in the south aisle. Two chests ordered by Queen Elizabeth – the outer for vestments and registers, the inner for the plate – were still there in 1935 but now the smaller has disappeared. There remains one of the two short-handled copper collecting boxes dated 1801, the silver-gilt Egerton chalice and the large painting thought to be of the school of Caravaggio. The smaller painting of 'The Good Shepherd' by William Dyce (given by the Stocks family) is on permanent loan to the Walker Art Gallery.

== Public houses ==
There are four pubs in the parish of Little Budworth. The Red Lion is in the heart of the village, opposite the church. The Shrewsbury Arms is on the road to Chester and the Cabbage Hall is on the A49. The Egerton Arms closed down in 2008 but has now re-opened.

== Little Budworth Common ==
Little Budworth Common is a country park and SSSI west of the village. Described in the SSSI citation as "one of the best surviving examples of lowland heath in Cheshire", it supports locally uncommon plant species such as heather Calluna vulgaris, bilberry Vaccinium myrtillus and purple moor-grass Molinia caerulea. The Friends of Little Budworth Common, a community group, help maintain the habitat. The site has designated routes for horse-riders and cyclists, and a waymarked Heathland Trail.

== See also ==
- Listed buildings in Little Budworth
