= Charles Egerton (MP for Ripon) =

English politician

- Born: 1585
- Died: May 3, 1662

Sir Charles Egerton (1585–1662) was a 17th-century English politician. He represented the seat of Ripon in Yorkshire between 1645 and December 1648, when he was removed in Pride's Purge.

== Biography ==
Egerton was born in Ireland, the son of Sir Charles Egerton, of Knockfergus in County Antrim, and Newborough, Staffordshire, and of Katherine (née Gates), daughter of Henry Gates. His mother had received Markenfield Hall as a part of her marriage settlement. His father was constable of Carrickfergus Castle from 1601 to 1602.

Egerton was admitted to St John's College, Cambridge, and in February 1613 to Lincoln's Inn. Egerton married Griselda Bawtree, and in 1622 became the owner of Markenfield Hall. In March 1620, his father passed ownership of various lands around Newborough to Egerton.

Egerton was member of parliament for Ripon from 1645 to 1648, during the English Civil War.

He died in 1662, with no heirs, and in his will left Markenfield Hall to his wife, Griselda.
