= Sir Roland Egerton, 1st Baronet =

English landowner and politician

Sir Roland Egerton, 1st Baronet DL (died 1646) was an English landowner and politician from the Egerton family who sat in the House of Commons in 1624.

== Life ==
Egerton was the son of Sir John Egerton (known as "black Sir John"), of Egerton and Oulton, Cheshire, of Wrinehill, Staffordshire, and of Farthingho, Northamptonshire, and his first wife, Margaret Stanley, daughter of Sir Rowland Stanley, of Hooton, Cheshire, and sister of the conspirator Sir William Stanley. He succeeded his father on 27 April 1614 and was knighted on 14 March 1617 at Whitehall. He was much troubled for some years with litigation over his father's estate, and in particular the validity of his last will and testament, which left much of the estate away from the immediate family to a cousin, Edward Egerton of Wrinehill.

He was created baronet of Egerton and Oulton on 5 April 1617. In 1624, he was elected Member of Parliament for Wootton Bassett in the Happy Parliament. He was a great supporter of the Royalist cause during the English Civil Wars, although he was too old to take an active part. Egerton died suddenly and was buried on 3 October 1646, at Farthingho.

Egerton married Bridget Grey, daughter of Arthur Grey, 14th Baron Grey de Wilton, sometime Chief Governor of Ireland and his second wife, Jane Sibella Morrison, granddaughter of Sir Richard Morrison, and sister and coheir of 15th and last Baron Grey of Wilton, who was attainted for treason in 1603. Bridget, who had some fame as a writer on religion, died on 28 July 1648, and was buried at Farthingho. They had five sons, four of whom died with issue.

- Sir John “Egert” Egerton, 2nd Bt (d. 1674), married Anne Wintour (d. 1681)
- Sir Philip Egerton, of Oulton (d. 1698), married Catherine Conway (d. 1707)
  - Rev. Philip Egerton (1662-1727), married Frances Offley (d. 1738)
    - John Egerton (1697-1770), married Elizabeth Brock (d. 1756)
      - Philip Egerton (d. 1786), married his first cousin Mary Eyles (1745-1821), daughter of Francis Haskins Eyles-Stiles, 3rd Bt. and Sibella Egerton
        - Frances Egerton (1779-1862), married in 1805 Thomas Tarleton (1776-1836)
          - Susan Tarleton (1814-1879), married William Tomkinson (1790-1872)
    - Sibella Egerton (1711 - bef. 1763) married to Sir Francis Haskins Eyles-Stiles, 3rd Bt.

Parliament of England
Preceded by Richard Harrison; John Wrenham	Member of Parliament for Wootton Bassett; 1624; With: John Bankes	Succeeded by Robert Hyde; Sir Walter Tichborne
Baronetage of England
New creation	Baronet (of Egerton and Oulton); 1617–1646	Succeeded by John Egerton
