= Frank Egerton =

British novelist from the Egerton family

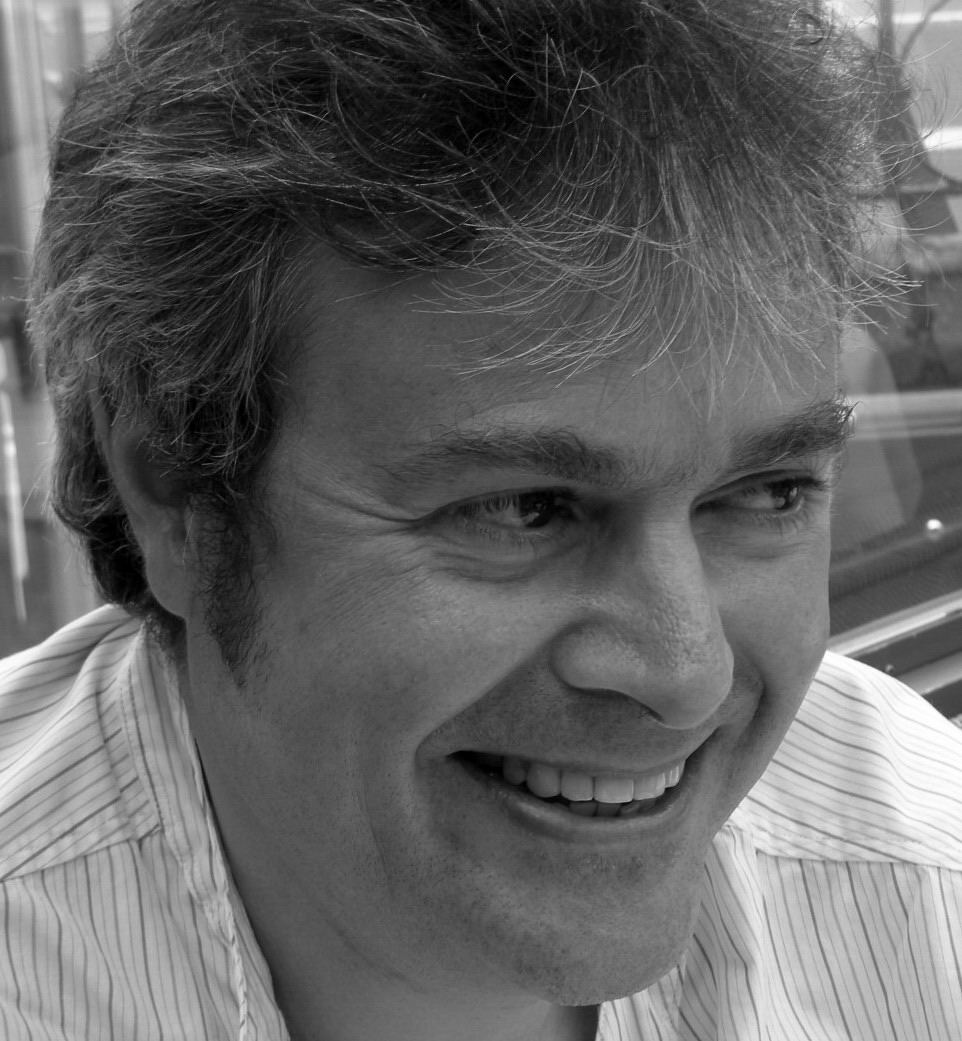
- Born: Francis David Egerton; 21 September 1959 (age 66)
- Occupations: Novelist, librarian
- Spouse: Jess née Owen
- Relatives: Egerton family

Egerton arms

Francis David Egerton (born 21 September 1959) is a British novelist from the Egerton family.

Writing as Frank Egerton, he is a tutor of creative writing at Oxford University and an Oxford University librarian. He reviewed fiction and non-fiction for newspapers including The Times and Financial Times from 1995 to 2008.

== Family ==
A great-great-great-grandson of Francis Egerton, 1st Earl of Ellesmere, second son of George Leveson-Gower, 1st Duke of Sutherland, he is in remainder to the Sutherland dukedom.

In 1995, Egerton married Jess Owen, and lives in West Oxfordshire.

== Career ==
After attending Stowe School, Frank Egerton qualified as an Associate of the Royal Institution of Chartered Surveyors, before going up to read English at Keble College. He is interested in "both the close examination of fiction and how technologies such as ebooks and print-on-demand have changed the publishing industry, offering fresh opportunities to writers."

His first novel, The Lock, was published in paperback in 2003 and his second, Invisible, was published by StreetBooks in 2010. The ebook version of The Lock reached the finals of the Independent e-Book Awards in Santa Barbara in 2002. In The Times review of Invisible Kate Saunders commented on "the author's lively wit and acute understanding of the emotional landscape."

Egerton is a member of the Society of Authors, Writers in Oxford and the Association of Writers & Writing Programs, and is a former editor of The Oxford Writer. He was Chairman of Writers in Oxford from 2008 to 2010.

== About Frank Egerton ==
- Gill Oliver Interview with Frank Egerton

== See also ==
- Duke of Sutherland
