= Oulton Estate =

Historic estate in Cheshire, England

Coordinates: 53.17842°N 2.61453°W

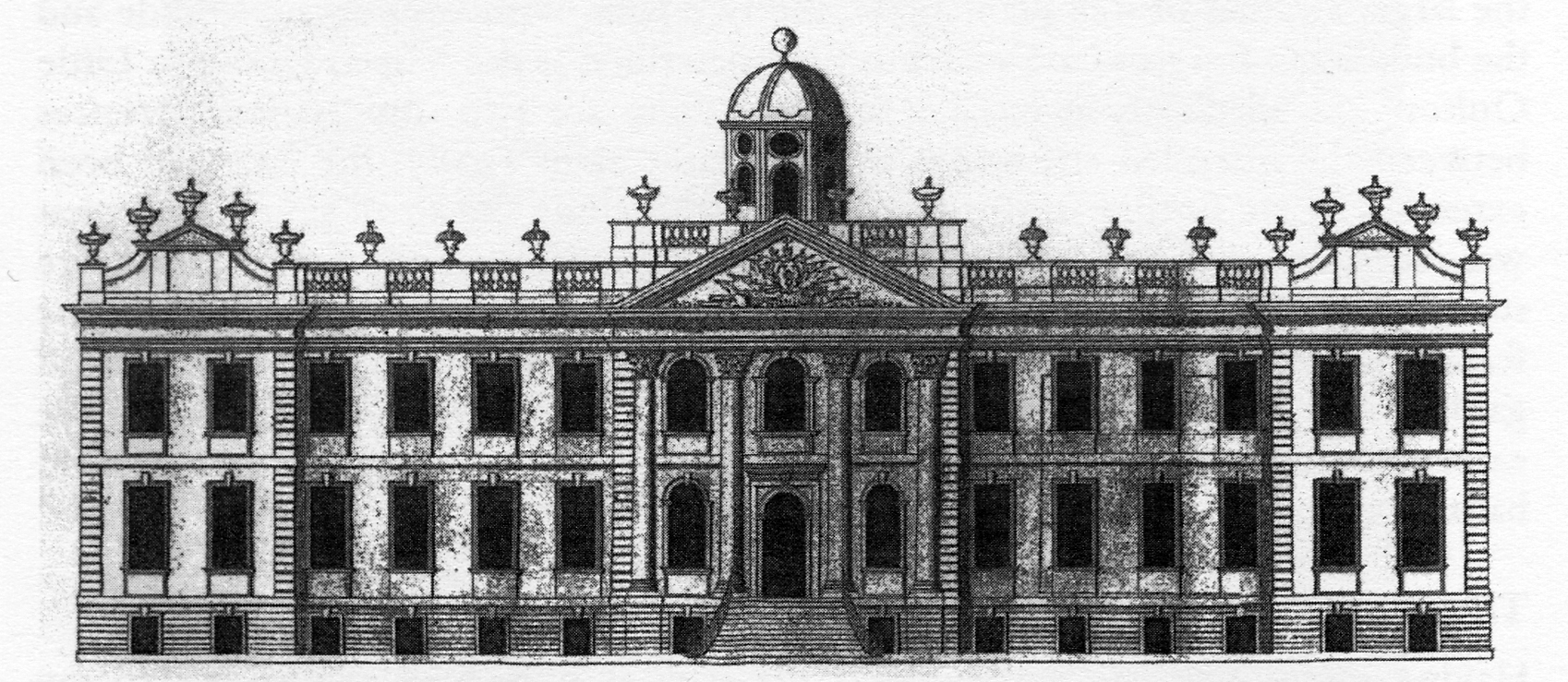
North elevation of Oulton Hall c. 1735

In the early 18th century the Oulton Estate was home to the Egerton family and comprised a manor house and a formal garden surrounded by farmland in Cheshire, England. Later in the century the farmland was converted into a park. The estate is now the site of the motor racing track called Oulton Park.

== History ==
=== Grounds ===
In 1731, Philip Egerton (1694–1766) inherited the estate upon the death of his uncle, John Egerton (1656–1731). At that time the estate comprised a house, a formal garden and farmland totalling 231 acres (0.93 km^{2}). Around 1752, Philip Egerton began to construct a brick wall to enclose the estate plus some additional fields, an area totalling 315 acres (1.27 km^{2}). At his death in 1766, Philip was succeeded by his brother John, and then in 1770, by his son Philip (1738–1786). By this time the fashion for formal gardens had been overtaken by the concept of a landscaped garden with surrounding parkland. Philip Egerton commissioned William Emes to plan this for his estate. Emes' plan was produced about 1770, but the work was still in progress 10 years later. The plan was to do away with the formal garden, to divert the brook and, by building dams, to create two lakes connected by a cascade. A banqueting hall was to be built on an island in the larger lake. There was to be extensive planting of trees and shrubs. The park was to include a bowling green, gravel paths and a boathouse.

=== House ===
In 1715, John Egerton commissioned the building of the new house. Tradition has it that the previous Tudor house had been destroyed by fire. The new house was in Baroque style. Its main front was in 15 bays, the middle three bays being occupied by a Corinthian centrepiece, its pediment filled with carvings of trophies. A drawing exists showing a central dome, but if this dome in fact ever existed, it did not survive to the 19th century. On the sides were curved pediments. The entrance hall rose through the building's two storeys. It contained Corinthian pilasters and had a plaster groined vault. Around 1773, the gates and gate piers which had been built around 1725 were removed to St Oswald's Church, Malpas. They were replaced by an entrance lodge comprising an arch with screen walls designed by Joseph Turner. In 1786, the house was inherited by John Egerton (1766–1825). He and his successors did carry out some improvements during the 19th century. Between about 1816 and 1820, Lewis Wyatt altered the interior and added stables and a terrace. In 1926, the house was destroyed by fire, and in 1940, it was bombed.

== Present day ==
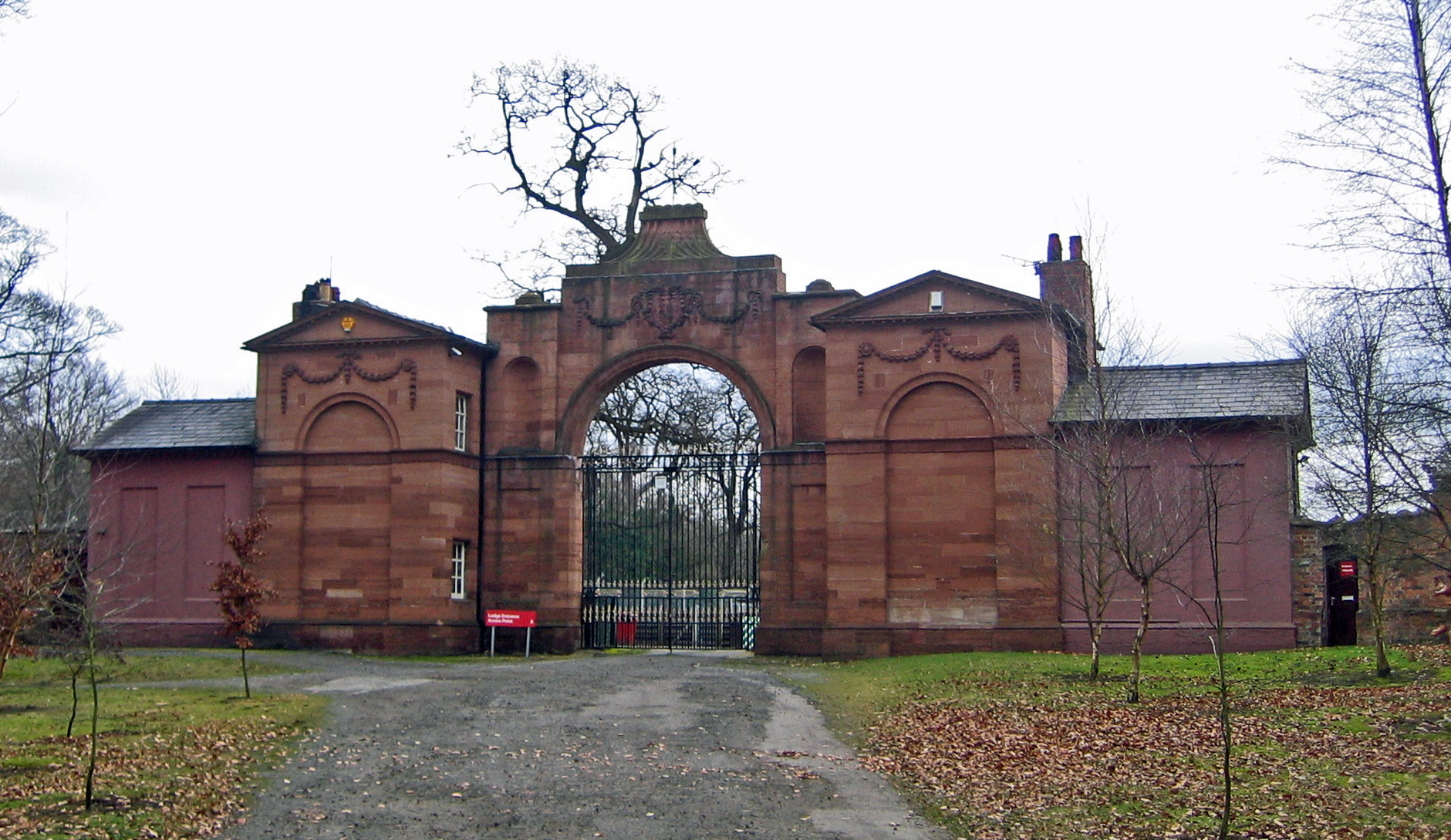
Entrance Lodge

The grounds are now used as a motor racing circuit. Some buildings that were part of the estate still exist. The entrance gates, lodges and screen designed by Joseph Turner in about 1775 are designated as a Grade II* listed building. In the grounds is a monument of 1846 to the memory of John Francis Egerton of the Bengal Horse Regiment, designed by Scott and Moffatt. It is also a Grade II* listed building. The stable block designed by Lewis Wyatt is still present and is listed at Grade II. A farm building close to the stable block is also listed at Grade II.
