= Eggert =

Eggert is a Germanic given name and surname, a phonetic variant of Egert or Eckert.

Notable people with the name include:

== Given name ==
- Eggert Achen (1853–1913), Danish architect
- Eggert Bogason, Icelandic discus thrower
- Eggert Gilfer (1892–1960), Icelandic chess player
- Eggert Guðmundsson (born 1964), Icelandic footballer
- Eggert Aron Guðmundsson (born 2004), Icelandic footballer
- Eggert Hannesson (1515–1583), Icelandic lawspeaker
- Eggert Jóhannesson, Icelandic footballer and manager
- Eggert Jónsson (born 1988), Icelandic football midfielder
- Eggert Christopher Knuth (1722–1776), Danish landowner, judge, and administrator
- Eggert Magnússon (born 1947), Icelandic businessman, former President of the Football Association of Iceland
- Eggert Munch (1685–1764), Norwegian painter
- Eggert Ólafsson (1726–1768), Icelandic explorer and writer
- Eggert Reeder (1894–1959), German jurist and civil servant
- Eggert Þorleifsson (born 1952), Icelandic actor
- Eggert Gíslason Þorsteinsson (1925–1995), Icelandic politician

== Surname ==
- Anders Eggert (born 1982), Danish handball player
- Christian Eggert (born 1986), German footballer
- Elmer Eggert (1902–1971), American baseball player
- Franz Xaver Eggert (1802–1876), German glass painter
- Hermann Eggert (1844–1920), German architect
- Joachim Nicolas Eggert (1779–1813), Swedish composer and musical director
- Konstantin Eggert (1883–1955), Russian actor and film director
- Maren Eggert (born 1974), German actress
- Michael Eggert (businessman) (born 1975), Danish businessman
- Michael Eggert (footballer) (born 1952), German footballer
- Moritz Eggert (born 1965), German composer and pianist
- Nicole Eggert (born 1972), American actress
- Otto Eggert (1874–1944), German geodesist
- Peter Eggert (born 1943), German football player and manager
- Toni Eggert, German luge

== Fictional characters ==
- Pelswick Eggert, the titular character from the animated show John Callahan's Pelswick

== See also ==
- Egerton (disambiguation)
