= Fred S. Robillard =

United States Marine Corps general

Fred Sevier Robillard
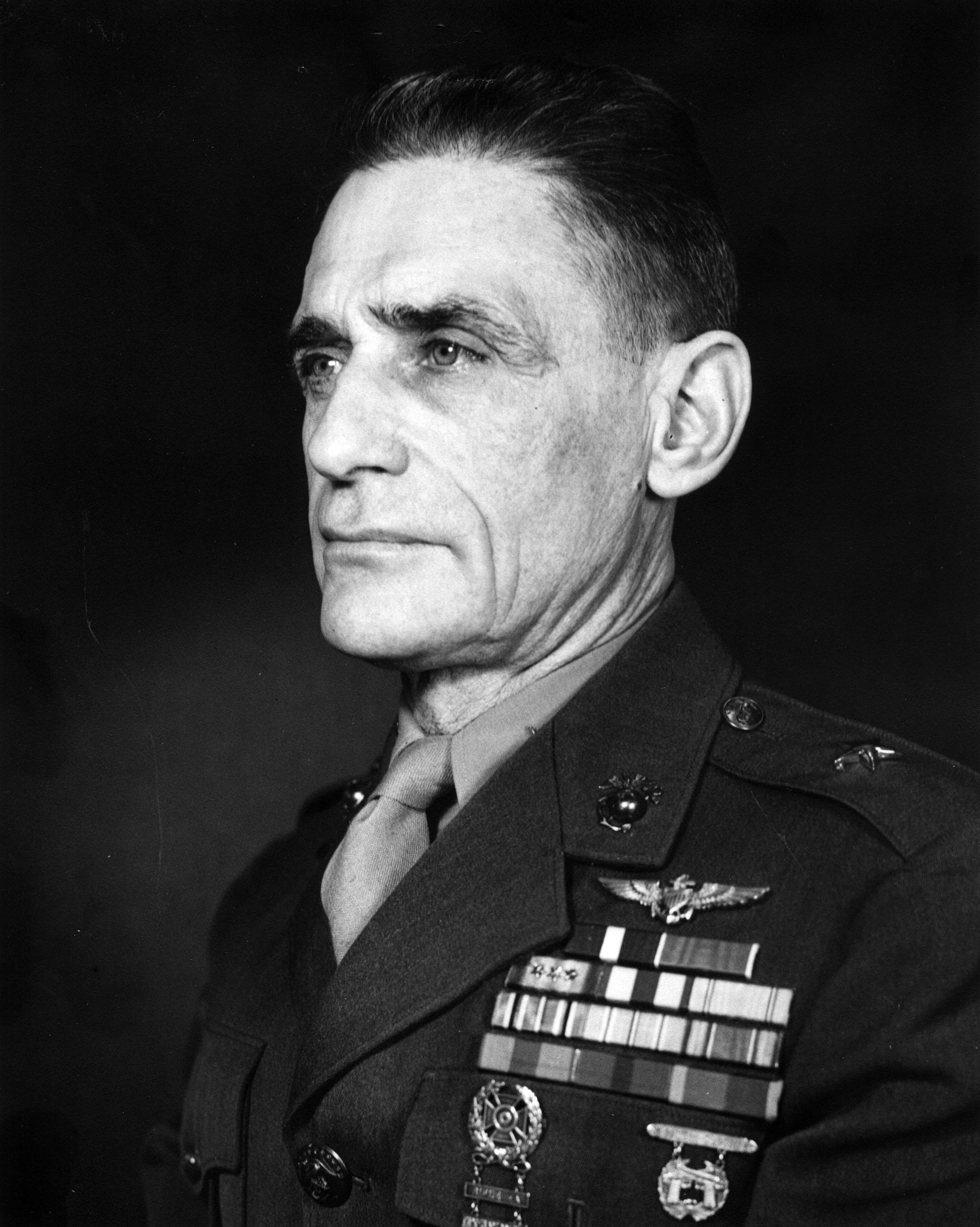
- Robillard as Brigadier General
- Born: September 14, 1890; Chicago, Illinois, US
- Died: January 31, 1971 (aged 80); Stamford, Connecticut, US
- Military career
- Allegiance: United States of America
- Branch: United States Marine Corps
- Service years: 1917–1919, 1920-1952
- Rank: Major general
- Service number: 0-3225
- Commands: Depot of Supplies San Francisco
- Conflicts: World War I Haitian Campaign; Yangtze Patrol; World War II
- Awards: Navy Cross; Legion of Merit

Fred Sevier Robillard (September 14, 1890 – January 31, 1971) was a highly decorated officer of the United States Marine Corps who reached the rank of major general. He was awarded the Navy Cross, the United States military's second-highest decoration awarded for valor in combat, as Naval aviator during World War I. Robillard later served as supply officer and retired as commanding general of Depot of Supplies San Francisco.

== Early career and World War I ==
Fred S. Robillard was born on September 14, 1890, in Chicago, Illinois, to Wilfred and Mary Robillard. He attended high school there and subsequently enrolled the University of Chicago, where he earned a bachelor's degree. In his early years, Robillard was involved in Auto racing and later in the sport of flying.

With the United States entry into World War I, young Robillard was eager to serve to his country. He enlisted the Marine Corps Flying Reserve as private in June 1917 and following the military flight training at Marine Barracks Parris Island, South Carolina, he was commissioned second lieutenant on December 17, 1917. Robillard was then stationed at Curtiss Field at Mineola, New York, and met his future wife, Alice Whilden Carrington there. The couple married during the same year.

He sailed for France in July 1918 and subsequently took part in bombing missions on the Belgian front as a member of Northern Bombing Group under the command of Major Alfred A. Cunningham. During September – November 1918, Robillard participated in the bombing missions against the enemy bases, aerodromes, submarine bases, ammunition dumps, railroad junctions, etc. He was decorated with the Navy Cross for his services and received the promotion to the rank of first lieutenant.

== Interwar period ==
Robillard returned stateside in December 1918 and following the brief leave home, he was attached to the 1st Marine Aviation Force at Norfolk, Virginia. In January of the following year, he was transferred to the Marine flying field at Miami, Florida, but requested inactive duty in June of that year. He worked as a civilian pilot, before joined U.S. Air Mail Service on November 11, 1919.

He served assignments in College Park, Maryland; Bellefonte, Pennsylvania; Belmont Park, New York and Newark, New Jersey, before his wife Alice got sick and Robillard requested to be relieved from duty. He wrote letter to his superior, James Clark Edgerton, in January 1920, but he was unable to find anyone to tell him he was leaving, and left a letter and message with another employee, who promised that he would deliver the message. Robillard change his mind in October 1920 and wrote letter to Edgerton and apologized for the error, but with no response. He also wrote letter to Second Assistant Postmaster General Otto Praeger with request for return to duty, again with no response.

Robillard then rejoined Marine Corps in November of that year and served as an enlisted man with Flight "L" in Sumay, Guam. He was reappointed first lieutenant in March 1921 and appointed pilot and engineer officer of that unit.

Upon his return to the United States in April 1923, Robillard retrained as Motor Transport Officer and served in that capacity under Major General Smedley Butler at Marine Barracks Quantico, Virginia. While served there, he was attached to the Company Officers' Course at Marine Corps Schools, Quantico in January 1925 and graduated from that course in July of that year. He was subsequently ordered to the Motor Transportation School at Camp Holabird, Maryland, for further schooling.

Following the graduation, he was ordered to Haiti for service as Motor Transportation Officer with Gendarmerie d'Haïti. He took part in the several patrols against rebel bandits and subsequently returned stateside in April 1929. Robillard was decorated with Haitian Médaille militaire with Diploma for his service there.

Robillard then served as Motor Transportation Officer within Depot of Supplies Philadelphia until November 1934, when he was ordered to Shanghai, China, as member of the 4th Marine Regiment. He served under Colonel John C. Beaumont as commander of service company and regimental transportation officer and took part in the guard duties of Shanghai International Settlement.

== World War II and later service ==
Upon his return to the States in June 1937, Robillard was ordered to the Senior Course at Marine Corps Schools, Quantico and graduated in June of the following year. He was then ordered to the Headquarters Marine Corps in Washington, D.C., and appointed officer in charge of Motor Transport Section within Supply Department. Robillard served in this capacity throughout the World War II and rose to the rank of colonel. He supervised the development of his department and received the Legion of Merit for his service in that capacity.

Although he did not take part in combat, he participated in several inspection tours in the Pacific area. Robillard was also decorated with Dutch Order of Orange-Nassau with Swords for his service in connection of training of Dutch Royal Marines in the United States.

In June 1946, Robillard was appointed executive officer, Office of the Quartermaster General and Chief, Supply Branch, Supply Department, at Headquarters Marine Corps and remained in that capacity under Major General William P. T. Hill until June 1948. He was also promoted to the rank of brigadier general in December 1946.

His last assignment was the commanding general of Marine Corps Depot of Supplies San Francisco, where he served until his retirement. Robillard retired on October 1, 1952, after 34 years of active service and was advanced to the rank of major general on the retired list for having been specially commended in combat.

He settled in Miami Shores, Florida, together with his wife Alice Carrington Robillard (1897–1968) and died on January 31, 1971, while on trip Stamford, Connecticut. Major General Robillard is buried at Arlington National Cemetery in Virginia, together with his wife. They had together one daughter.

== Decorations ==
Here is the ribbon bar of Major General Fred S. Robillard:

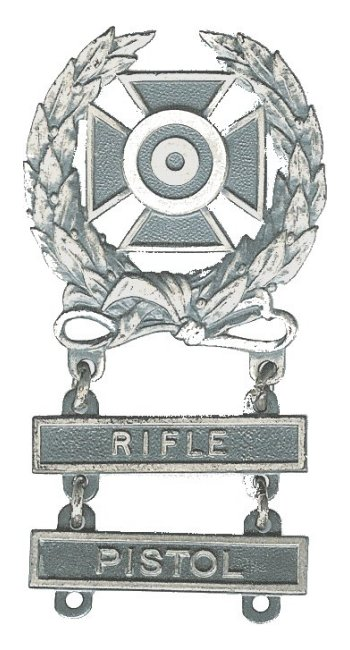

Naval Aviator Badge
1st Row	Navy Cross			
2nd Row	Legion of Merit	Marine Corps Good Conduct Medal	World War I Victory Medal with three battle clasps	Marine Corps Expeditionary Medal
3rd Row	Navy Expeditionary Medal	American Defense Service Medal	American Campaign Medal	Asiatic-Pacific Campaign Medal
4th Row	World War II Victory Medal	National Defense Service Medal	Haitian Médaille militaire with Diploma	Dutch Order of Orange-Nassau with Swords, Commander

== See also ==
- Airmails of the United States
- United States Naval Aviator
