= United States airmail service =

Former US mail delivery service

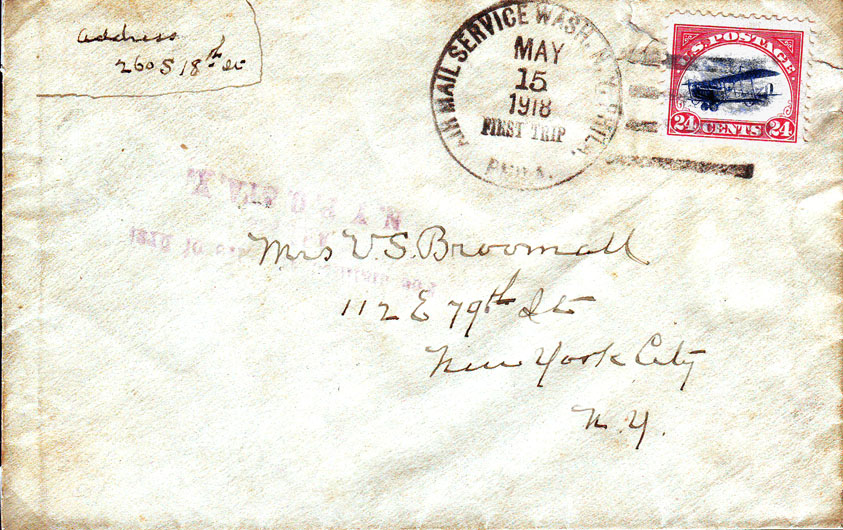
Cover flown on the first day of scheduled Air Mail Service in the U.S. and franked with the first U.S. Air Mail stamp, the 24 Cent "Jenny"(C-3). Cancel: "AIR MAIL SERVICE – WASH. N.Y. PHILA." "MAY 15, 1918 – FIRST TRIP" "PHILA." (Type: USPOD CDS w/killer bars)

United States airmail was a service class of the United States Post Office Department (USPOD) and its successor United States Postal Service (USPS) delivering air mail by aircraft flown within the United States and its possessions and territories. Letters and parcels intended for air mail service were marked as "Via Air Mail" (or equivalent), appropriately franked, and assigned to any then existing class or sub-class of the Air Mail service.

After an intermittent series of government sponsored experimental flights between 1911 and 1918, domestic U.S. Air Mail was formally established as a new class of service by the Post Office Department on May 15, 1918, with the inauguration of the Washington–Philadelphia–New York route for which the first of special Air Mail stamps were issued.

The exclusive transportation of flown mail by government-operated aircraft came to an end in 1926 under the provisions of the Air Mail Act of 1925, better known as the Kelly Act. which required the USPOD to transition to contracting with commercial air carriers to fly them over Contract Air Mail (CAM) routes to be established by the department, although during the first half of 1934 the United States Army Air Corps temporarily took over the routes—with disastrous results—when all CAM contracts were summarily canceled by President Franklin D. Roosevelt owing to the Air Mail scandal. Domestic air mail became obsolete in 1975 as a distinct extra fee service, and international air mail in 1995, when the USPS began transporting all First Class long-distance intercity mail by air on a routine basis.

== Experimental airmails ==
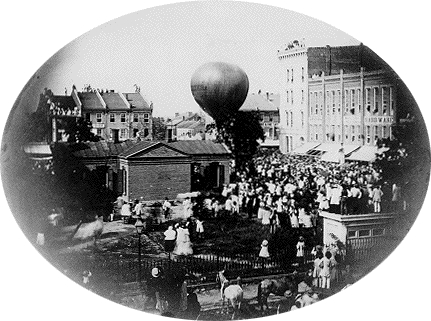
Wise ascends on the first United States balloon airmail from Lafayette, Indiana in 1859.

During the first aerial flight in North America by balloon on January 9, 1793, from Philadelphia to Deptford Township, New Jersey, Jean-Pierre Blanchard carried a personal letter from George Washington to be delivered to the owner of whatever property Blanchard happened to land on, making the flight the first delivery of air mail in the United States.

John Wise piloted an unofficial balloon post flight that took place on July 17, 1859, from St. Louis, Missouri, to Henderson, New York, a distance of 1,290 km on which he carried a mailbag entrusted to him by the American Express Company. One month later, on August 17, Wise flew from Lafayette, Indiana, to Crawfordsville, Indiana, and carried 123 letters and 23 circulars on board that had been collected by the postmaster Thomas Wood and endorsed "PREPAID" but only one of these historic postal covers was discovered in 1957. In 1959 the United States Postal Service issued a 7-cent stamp (C-54) commemorating Wise's flight in the Jupiter. Balloon mail was also carried on a June 1877 flight at Nashville, Tennessee.

=== USPOD sponsored experiments ===
The first official experiment at flying air mail to be made under the aegis of the United States Post Office Department took place on September 23, 1911, on the first day of an International Air Meet sponsored by The Nassau Aviation Corporation of Long Island, when pilot Earle L. Ovington flew 640 letters and 1,280 postcards from the Aero Club of New York's airfield located on Nassau Boulevard near Stratford School in Garden City (Long Island), New York, to the nearby Mineola Post Office in Mineola, located less than six miles away. After being duly sworn in by U.S. Postmaster General Frank Hitchcock as the first U.S. air mail pilot in history, Ovington took off in his own American-made Bleriot Queen tractor-type monoplane, Dragonfly, at 5:26 PM and dropped the bag of mail over Mineola six minutes later from an altitude of 500 feet. Unfortunately the bag broke when it hit the ground, but all of the mail was eventually recovered and forwarded by regular channels with the cancellation reading "AEROPLANE STATION No.1 – GARDEN CITY ESTATES, N.Y." Emphasizing the concept, in 1912 the United States printed a 20-cent stamp in the Parcel Post series showing a flying machine and titled, "AEROPLANE CARRYING MAIL". The mailbag behind the pilot is labeled "No. 1".

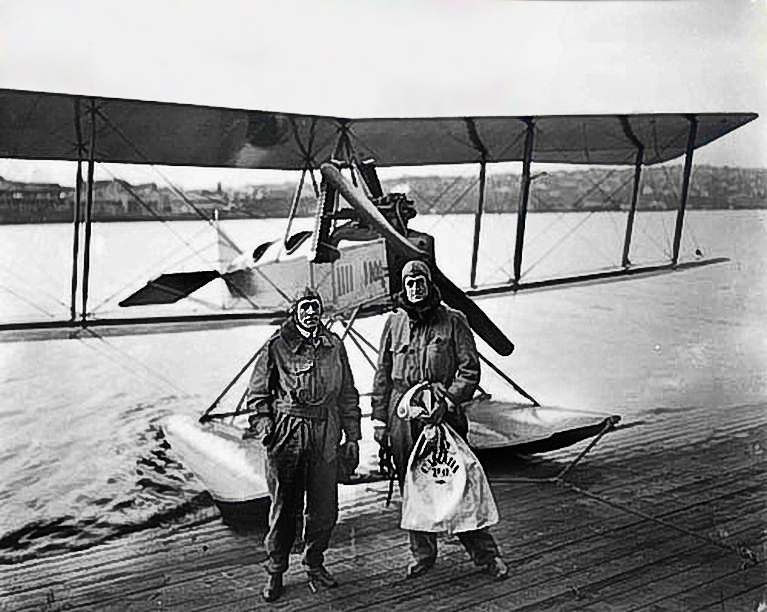
Eddie Hubbard (left) and William E. Boeing stand in front of a Boeing C-700 seaplane near Seattle.

The first experimental foreign air mail flight from the U.S. was made by Eddie Hubbard and William E. Boeing while on a survey flight to Vancouver, British Columbia, on March 3, 1919. On board with them was a mail bag containing 60 letters, making this the first international U.S. Air Mail flight. Their aircraft was a modified World War I Boeing Model C trainer which had a cruising speed of 65 mph. Hubbard later flew the first international contract mail route, from Seattle to Victoria, British Columbia, which began on October 15, 1920. The route (FAM 2) was created to connect with steamships going to Asia.

== Scheduled airmails ==
=== U.S. Government flown air mail ===
On February 18, 1911, Fred J. Wiseman transported two letters to Santa Rosa, California Postmaster H.l. Tripp from Petaluma, California Postmaster John Olmsted. When the letters arrived, Fred became the pilot who carried the first airmail sanctioned by a U.S. postal authority.

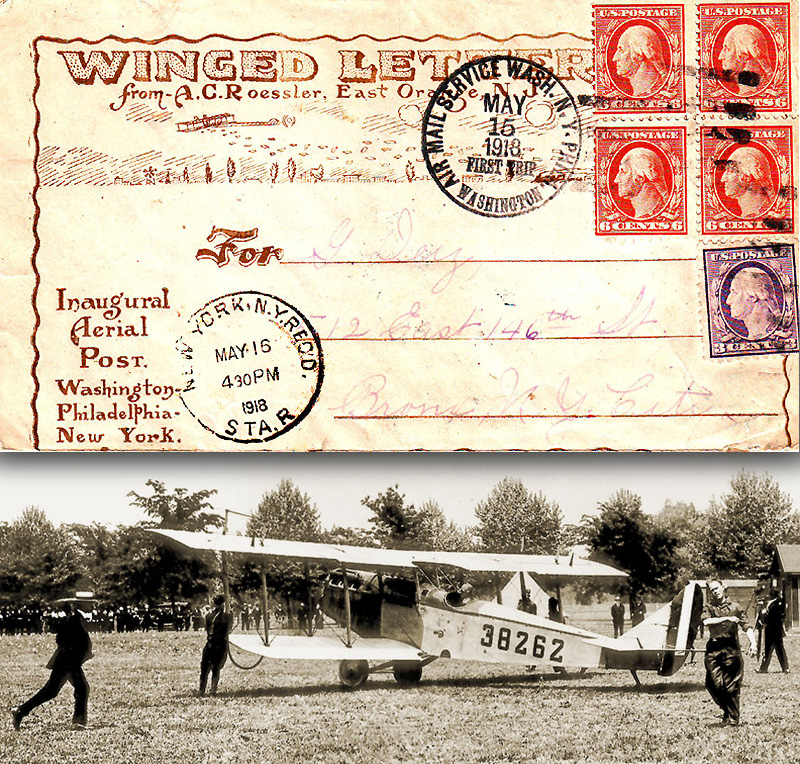
The first U.S. Air Mail takes off from Washington, D.C., on May 15, 1918.

The first scheduled US airmail service connected Washington, D.C., and New York. This 218-mile route was designed by Augustus Post, the Secretary of the Aero Club of America, who had served as an assistant to Alexander Graham Bell's Aerial Experiment Association in 1908 and was newly returned from special military service training aviators in Britain and France. The route was the first step in establishing a transcontinental route by air. Transcontinental air service was the best opportunity for airmail to provide faster service at lower cost than the existing railroads. Routes like College Park, Maryland to New York were only slightly faster than the railroad, but were a good laboratory for developing safe and reliable airmail operations.

Throughout the airmail's planning, the US was preparing to fight World War I and this exposed deep flaws in American airpower including obsolete aircraft and too few pilots, both in quality and quantity. As a result, Post Office and military officials believed airmail could increase the speed of communication while also improving military pilots. By flying the mail, novice pilots would develop their long-distance flying skills including aerial navigation.

The first scheduled U.S. Air Mail service began on May 15, 1918, using six converted United States Army Air Service Curtiss JN-4HM "Jenny" biplanes flown by Army pilots under the command of Major Reuben H. Fleet and operating on a route between Washington, D.C. (Washington Polo Grounds) and New York City (Belmont Park) with an intermediate stop in Philadelphia (Bustleton Field). Among those who were on hand for the departure of the first flight from Washington, D.C., were President Woodrow Wilson, U.S. Postmaster General Albert S. Burleson, and Assistant Secretary of the Navy Franklin D. Roosevelt. Army 2nd Lt. George L. Boyle was selected to pilot aircraft #38262 on the first northbound flight which, unfortunately, turned out to be a somewhat less than successful initial venture.

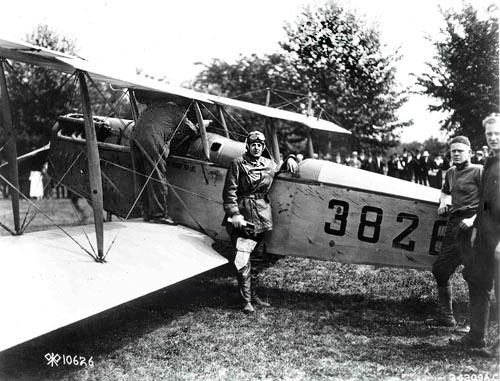
Maj. Ruben Fleet by Lt. Boyle's Jenny before the take off from Washington, D.C., for Philadelphia on May 15, 1918

Almost immediately after taking off at 11:47 AM, Boyle became disoriented and started flying South when he followed the wrong set of railroad tracks out of the city. Realizing that he was lost, Boyle attempted to find out where he was by making an unscheduled landing just 18 minutes later at 12:05 PM in Waldorf, Maryland, about 25 miles south of the city. Unfortunately, however, he broke the prop on his airplane when he made a hard landing, so the 140 pounds of mail he was carrying had to be trucked back to Washington.

However aviators 1st Lt. Torrey H. Webb and 2nd Lt. James C. Edgerton completed the scheduled southbound relay with 144 pounds of mail, and Edgerton then flew Boyle's mail to Philadelphia the following day. The site of the first continuously scheduled air mail service is marked by a plaque in West Potomac Park in Washington, D.C.. The route was extended to Boston three weeks later on June 4.

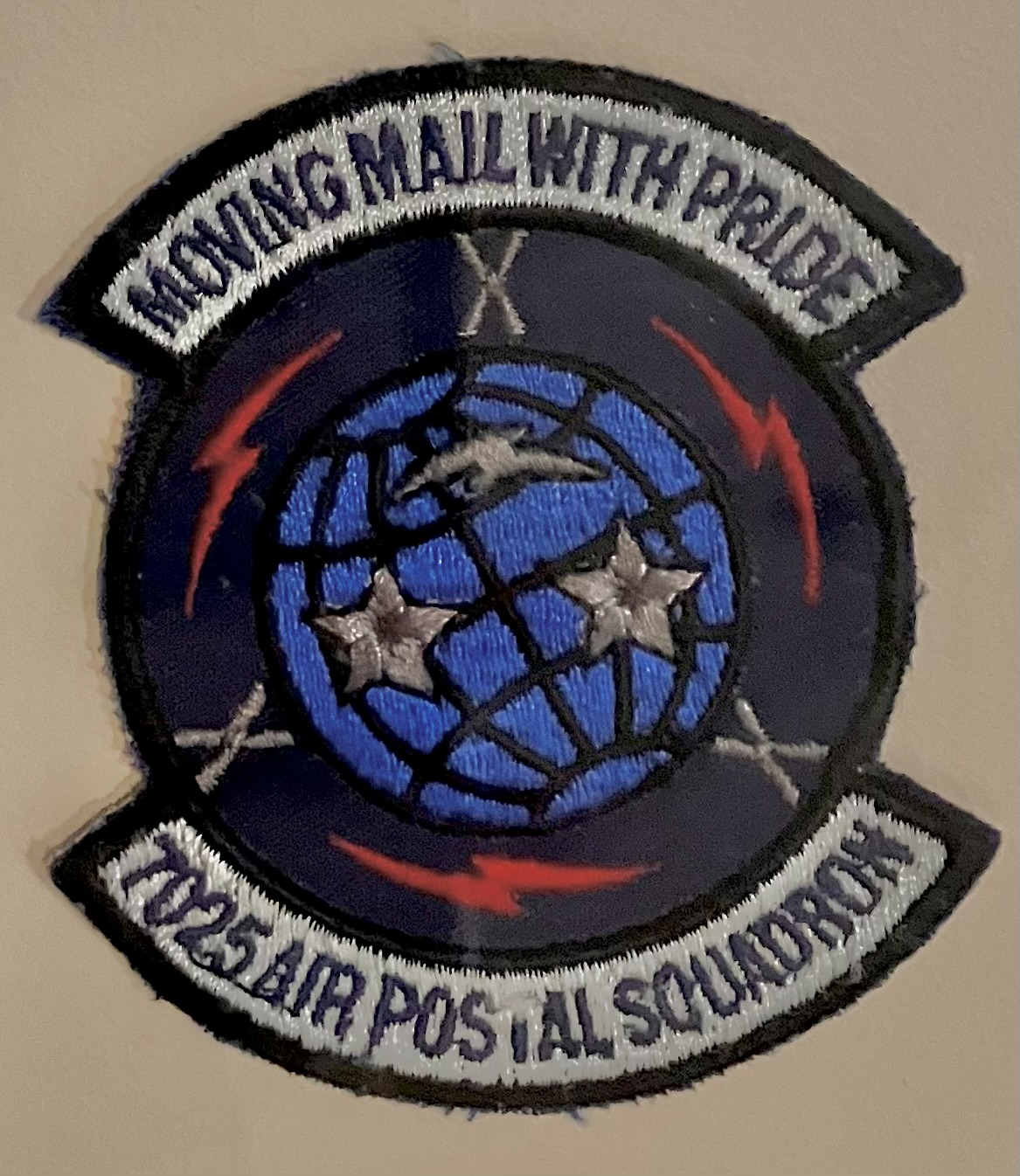
The patch of the 7025th Air Postal Squadron, which belonged to U.S. Military Postal Service

After four months of the mail being flown by the Army, all flight operations were taken over by the USPOD's Aerial Mail Service on August 12, 1918, using a fleet of six purpose built JR-1B mail biplanes designed and constructed by the Standard Aero Corporation of Elizabeth, New Jersey, and flown by civilian pilots hired by the Post Office Department. After a number of "pathfinder" flights made in September, November, and early December, the first flight providing scheduled east–west service between New York and Chicago occurred on December 17, 1918.

Flight operations moved nine miles northeast to the College Park Air Field. Already a proven airfield for training military pilots between 1909–1911 and with active civilian flight operations in 1918, it was already a functioning field requiring minimal modification for airmail operations. In fact, College Park was the preferred location when Major Rueben Fleet scouted locations for the Army airmail. However, officials chose the Polo Grounds for its proximity to the White House and Congress.

In 1919, the Post Office built a new hangar and a "compass rose" at College Park (both still exist today). The compass rose was a concrete compass in the ground to continuously display true north. At the time, airplane compasses needed to be calibrated before every flight. Pilots lined up their planes on the roses’ north-south directional axis to check their compass’ accuracy. This was a temporary solution until better instruments and navigation systems were developed for aircraft.

While the role of the DC-NY route was to create an organization and develop reliable operations, the long-term success in aviation both economically and velocity required it to expand across the continent. In 1921, postal officials closed the College Park airmail station to focus on routes where airmail was clearly superior in speed and cost to the railroad. However, the field remained home to researchers, inventors, and businesses focused on developing commercial aviation.

=== Air mail franking ===
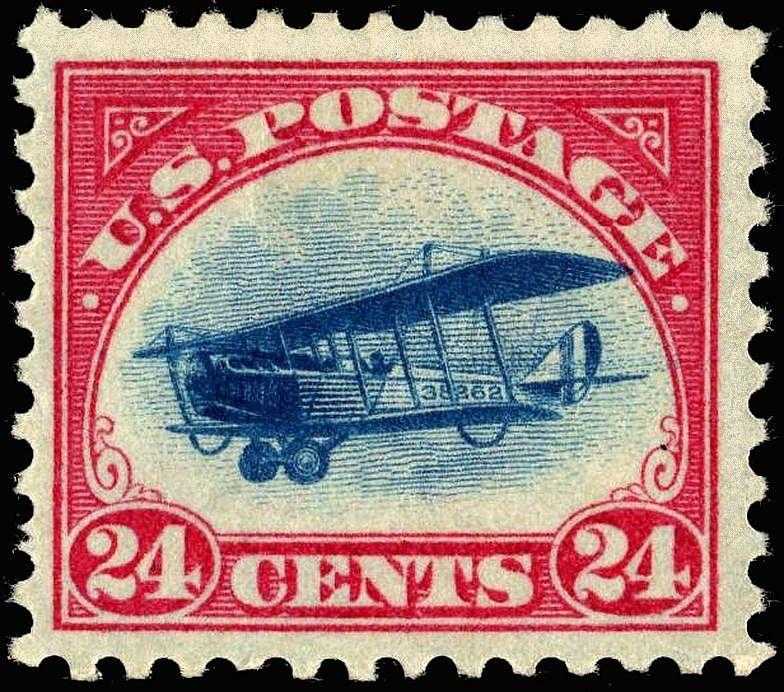
C-3, issued on May 13, 1918

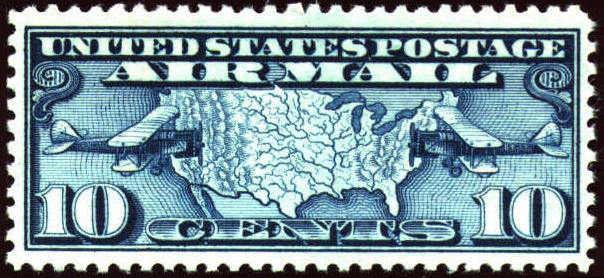
C-7, issued on February 13, 1926

The original air mail letter rate per ounce between any two points on the route when service began was 24 cents per ounce for which the first special-purpose U.S. air mail stamp (C-3) was issued on May 13, 1918. The red and blue stamp's vignette depicted Army JN-4 #38262, the aircraft that made the first airmail flight from Washington two days later, and the 24 cent fee it represented was apportioned at two cents for postage, 12 cents for air service, and 10 cents for Special Delivery. On July 15 the rate was dropped to 16 cents for the first ounce and 6 cents for each additional ounce, and on December 15 the rate was dropped again to 6 cents per ounce when Special Delivery was made optional. Additional monochromatic stamps of similar design to C-3 were also issued contemporaneously with these rate changes in 16-cent (green) and 6-cent (orange) denominations. Although these extra fee stamps were issued for use on mails to be serviced by air, the legend "AIR MAIL" did not appear on any USPOD stamp until eight years later when the 10-cent C-7 rectangular was issued on February 13, 1926, two days before the first ever mail flight under contract with a commercial carrier was made on February 15, an eastbound trip between Detroit and Cleveland over CAM Route 7.

=== Air mail strike ===
Angered by the insistence of Second Assistant United States Postmaster General Otto Praeger that they fly their routes on time even in zero visibility conditions in order to maintain fixed schedules or be fired – a policy that had resulted in 15 crashes and two fatalities in the previous two weeks alone – U.S. Airmail Service pilots began a spontaneous strike on July 22, 1919. After Preager and the United States Post Office Department received much negative comment in the press, the strike ended in less than a week, on July 26, 1919, when the Post Office Department agreed that officials in Washington, D.C., would no longer insist on pilots flying in dangerous weather conditions.

=== Transcontinental air mail ===
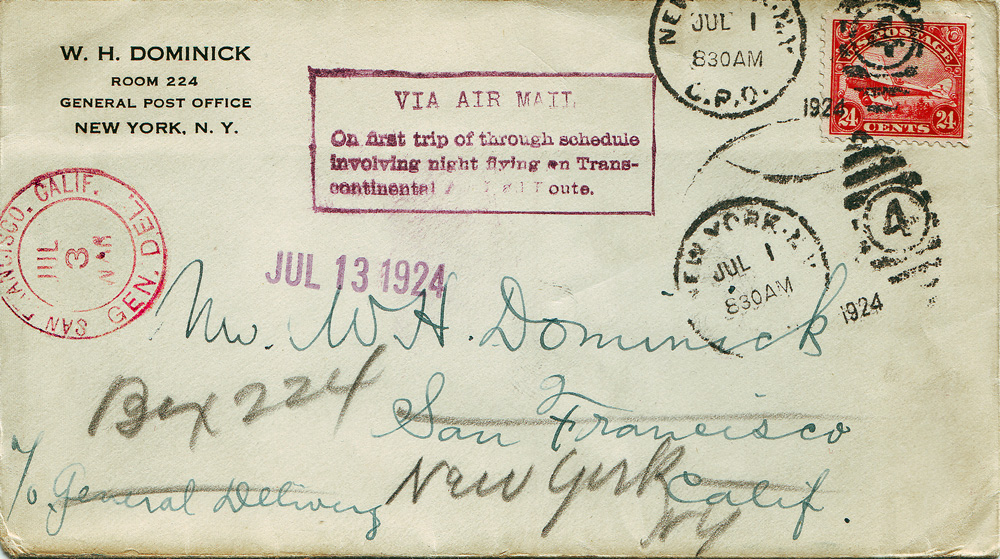
Cover carried on the first Transcontinental Air Mail trip (NY to SF) involving night flying, July 1, 1924

Scheduled transcontinental air mail service flown between New York (Hazelhurst Field, L.I.) and San Francisco (Marina Field) began on September 8, 1920, over a route laid out in July and August by Eddie Rickenbacker and Bert Acosta who had helped pilot the first experimental through flight carrying about 100 letters which landed at Durant Field located at 82nd Ave and E. 14th St. in East Oakland. The transcontinental mails were originally flown only during daylight hours while being entrained at night, although on February 22, 1921, a nighttime leg on this route (Omaha to Chicago) was flown for the first time with Jack Knight as the pilot. The first daily Transcontinental Air Mail service involving both day and night flying over the entire route was opened on July 1, 1924, which reduced the time of the trip from more than 70 hours to a schedule of 34 hours 46 minutes Westbound, and 32 hours 3 minutes Eastbound.. In addition to New York and San Francisco, the route included thirteen intermediate stops where mails were exchanged and aircrew relieved. This was accomplished at airfields located at Bellefonte (PA), Cleveland (OH), Bryan, (OH), Chicago (IL), Iowa City (IA), Omaha (NE), North Platte (NE), Cheyenne (WY), Rawlins (WY), Rock Springs (WY), Salt Lake City (UT), Elko (NV) and Reno (NV). During this time, a series of navigational beacons were constructed across the country to help guide pilots delivering air mail. They were placed about 25 miles apart from each other, and included large concrete arrows with accompanying lights to illuminate them.

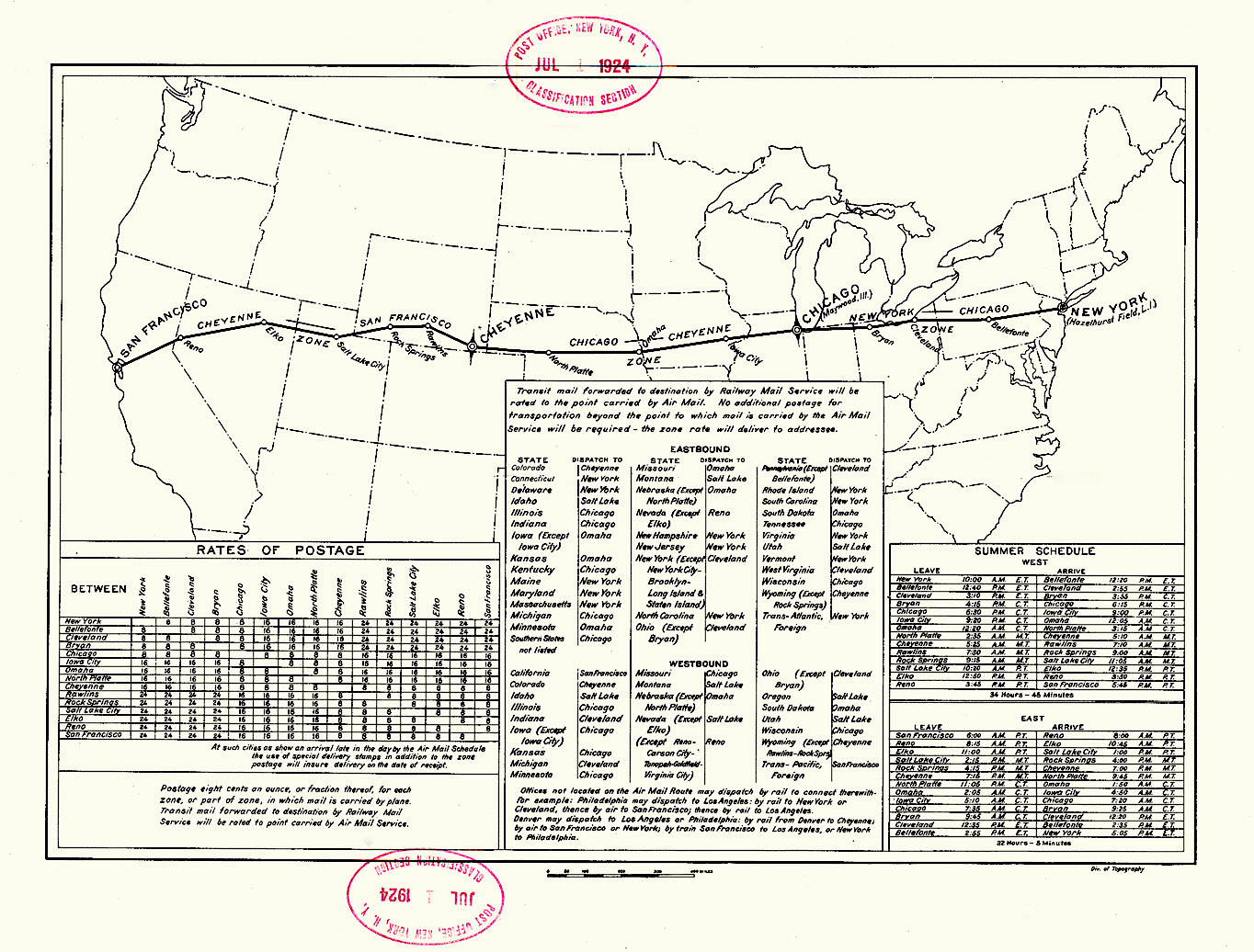
U.S. Post Office Department map of the First Transcontinental Air Mail Route involving both day and night flying over the entire route opened July 1, 1924.

== Shift to commercially flown air mail ==
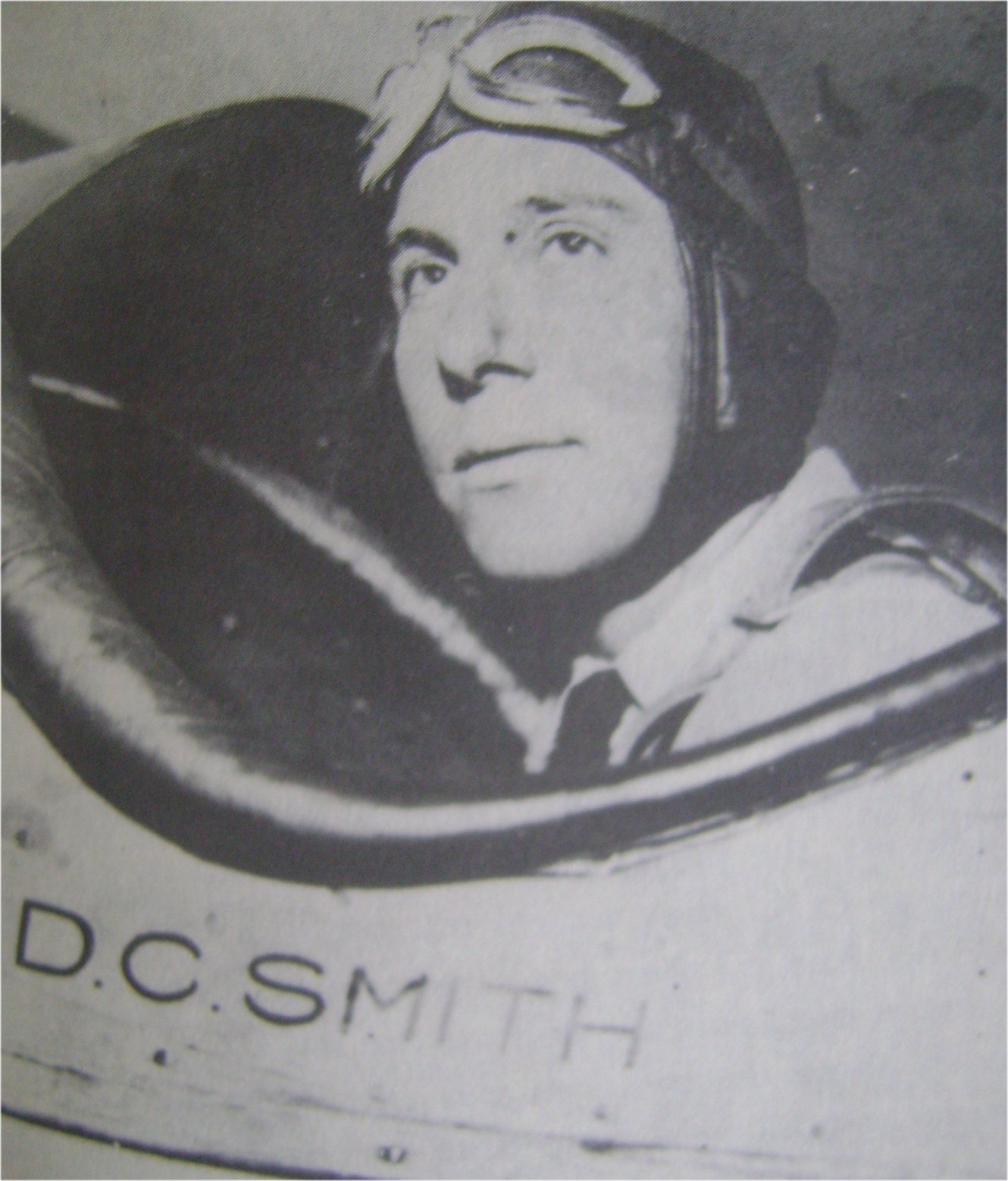
Dean Smith, air mail pilot, circa 1922

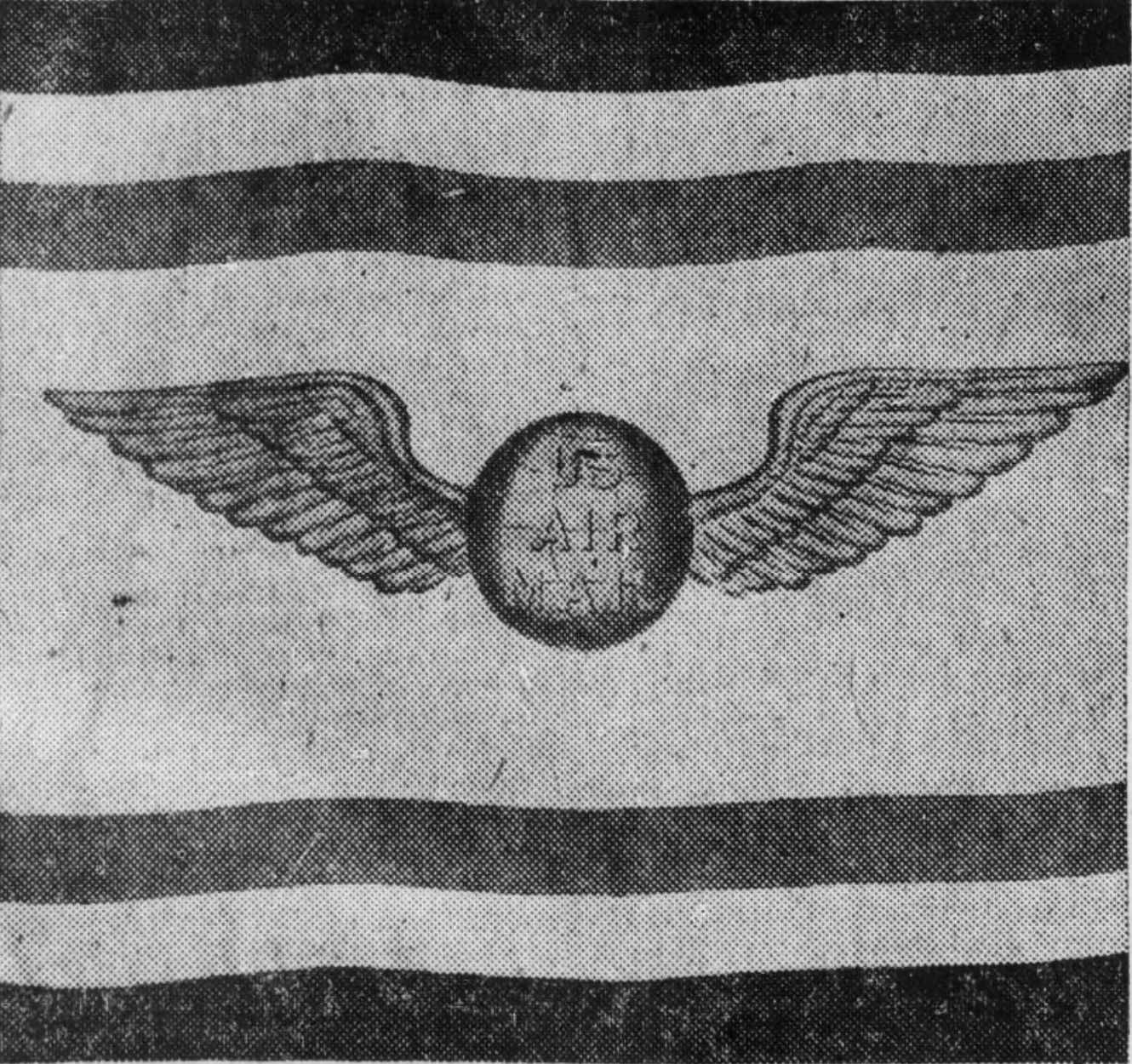
Flag of the Air Mail Service, 1930

For the first eight years of the Air Mail service (May 1918 to February 1926), all mails were flown entirely in U.S. Government owned and operated airplanes. On February 2, 1925, however, the Congress mandated that this would change with the passage of HR 7064 entitled "An Act to encourage commercial aviation and to authorize the Postmaster General to contract for Air Mail Service" (45 Stat. 594 (1925); P.L. 359, 68th Cong.). Better known as "The Kelly Act," it directed the U.S. Post Office Department to contract with commercial air carriers to survey, establish, and operate service over a variety of designated new routes many of which connected with the already existing Government operated Transcontinental Air Mail route between New York and San Francisco. Contracts based on competitive bids for the first five routes were awarded in October 1925, with operators originally to be compensated "at a rate not to exceed four-fifths of the revenue derived from the air mail." (This was changed on July 1, 1926, to a rate based on the total weight of the mails carried on each flight.) As of September 1, 1927, all U.S. air mail routes (including the previously Government operated Transcontinental Route) were being flown under contract by commercial carriers.

Boeing started up an airplane manufacturing business which sold 50 aircraft to the U.S. Navy. At the end of war Boeing began to concentrate on commercial aircraft, secured contracts to supply airmail service and built a successful airmail operation. His airmail business was in the middle of the Air Mail scandal of the 1930s. In 1934, the United States government accused Boeing of monopolistic practices. The Air Mail Act of 1934 ordered him to break up his company United Aircraft and Transport Corporation into three separate entities: United Aircraft Corporation, Boeing Airplane Company, and United Air Lines. Thomas Braniff led the fight by independent airlines to break the power of the airline holding companies that dominated air transportation in the 1930s.

=== Contract Air Mail (CAM) service ===
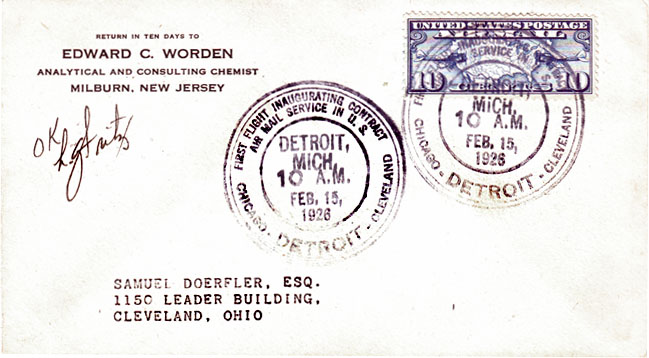
Cover flown on the first commercial U.S. Air Mail flight on February 15, 1926

The first two commercial Contract Air Mail (CAM) routes to begin operation in the United States were CAM-6 between Detroit (Dearborn) and Cleveland and CAM-7 between Detroit (Dearborn) and Chicago which were simultaneously inaugurated on February 15, 1926. The contractor for both routes was the Ford Motor Company, operating as Ford Air Transport, using a fleet of six Ford built Stout 2-AT aircraft. Lawrence G. Fritz, later the Vice President for Operations for TWA, was the pilot of the first flight to take off with mail from Ford Airport at Dearborn, on the CAM-6 eastbound leg to Cleveland.

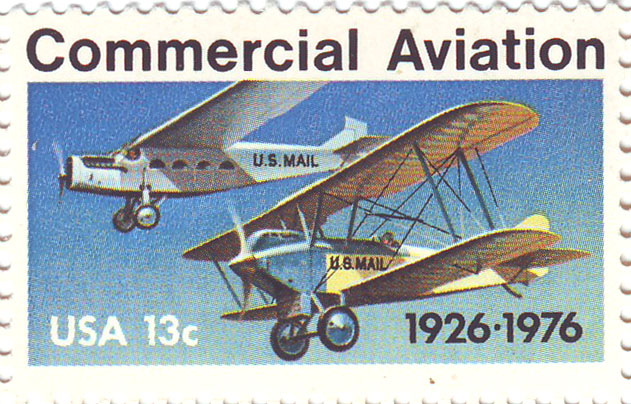
Scott #1684

On March 19, 1976, the USPS issued a 13-cent First Class commemorative Postage Stamp (Scott #1684) honoring the 50th anniversary of U.S. commercial aviation launched with Contract Air Mail service over these two routes as well as on CAM-5 which was inaugurated next on April 6, 1926, over the 487-mile route between Pasco, Washington, and Elko, Nevada, with an intermediate stop in Boise, Idaho.

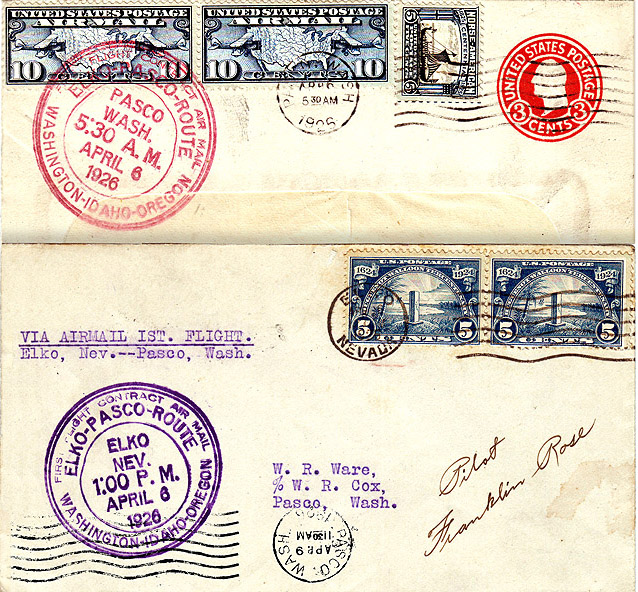
Covers flown on the first flights Eastbound and Westbound over CAM-5

Operated by Varney Air Lines (which later became part of United Airlines), the first Eastbound flight over CAM-5 was made successfully using a Laird Swallow biplane piloted by Leon D. Cuddeback. The first Westbound flight that afternoon was much less successful, however, as it was forced 75-miles off course by a storm en route from Elko to Boise before making a forced landing near Jordan Valley, Oregon. The plane and pilot Franklin Rose remained missing for two days until Rose managed to reach a telephone on April 8 after carrying the 98 pounds of mail for many miles on foot and on a horse borrowed from a farmer. The Westbound flown mail finally arrived at the Post Office in Pasco late in the morning of April 9, three days after leaving Elko.

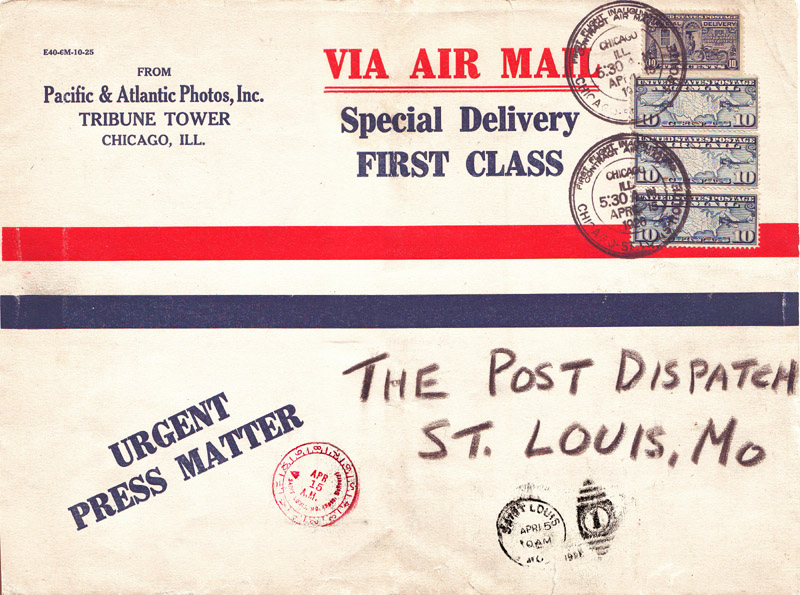
A large commercial corner cover flown by Charles A. Lindbergh from Chicago to St. Louis on the opening day of CAM-2, April 15, 1926

On April 15, 1926, the third route to open (CAM-2) began operation with pilot Charles A. Lindbergh at the controls on the first flight. In October 1925, Lindbergh was hired by the Robertson Aircraft Corporation in St. Louis, Missouri, (where he had been working as a flight instructor) to first lay out, and then serve as chief pilot for the newly designated 278-mile CAM-2 to provide service between St. Louis and Chicago (Maywood Field) with two intermediate stops in Springfield and Peoria, Illinois. Operating from Robertson's home base at the Lambert-St. Louis Flying Field in Anglum, Missouri, Lindbergh and three other RAC pilots he selected (Philip R. Love, Thomas P. Nelson and Harlan A. "Bud" Gurney) flew the mail over CAM-2 in a fleet of four modified war surplus de Havilland DH-4 biplanes. A little more than a year later Lindbergh was catapulted from being an otherwise obscure 25-year-old Air Mail pilot to virtual instantaneous world fame when he successfully piloted the Ryan NYP single engine monoplane Spirit of St. Louis on the first non-stop flight from New York to Paris in May 1927.

In a decade of service after the conclusion of the war, fatality rates improved from a rough average of 1 per 100,000 miles flown, to 1 per 1.4 million miles flown in 1927.

A total of 34 Contract Air Mail routes would eventually be established in the US between February 15, 1926, and October 25, 1930, however with the Air Mail scandal in 1934, the USPOD canceled all the contracts on February 9, 1934, which resulted in the suspension of commercial CAM service effective February 19, 1934. Air mail was flown exclusively by the U.S. Army (as the "Army Air Corps Mail Operation") from February 19 to May 8, 1934, when new temporary contracts with private carriers were put into effect. During this period there were a total of 66 accidents resulting in the deaths of 12 Army pilots including two who were killed on the last AACMO flight on June 6, 1934.

Contract Air Mail routes established between 1925 and 1930. These contracts were terminated in 1934. Some spur lines and night and weekend routes not shown.

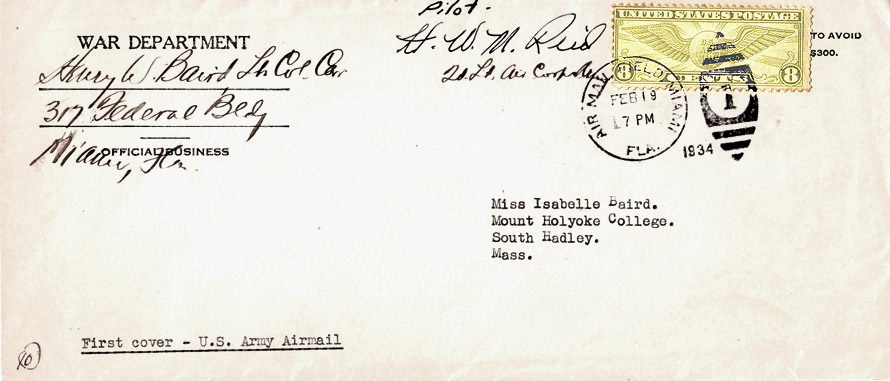
Cover flown from Miami, Florida, to Boston, Massachusetts, on the first day of emergency Army Air Mail service on February 19, 1934.

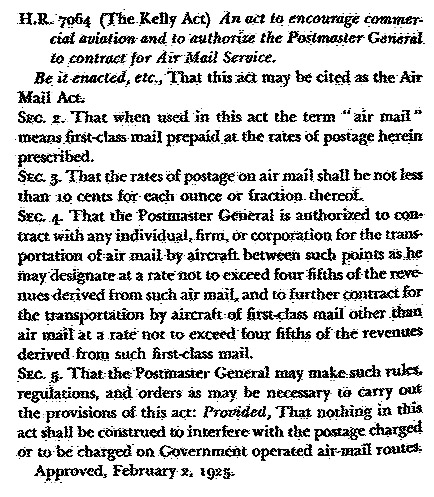
The Air Mail Act of 1925

== End of domestic U.S. air mail as a distinct service ==
Air mail as a distinct service was effectively ended within the United States on October 10, 1975, however, when all domestic intercity first-class mails began to be transported by air whenever practical and/or expeditious at the normal first-class rate. Domestic air mail as a separate class of service (and its rate structure) was formally eliminated by the successor to the Post Office Department, the United States Postal Service (USPS) on May 1, 1977.

When the USPS began to service all international First Class mails by air without additional charge in 1995 and simultaneously eliminated Surface (or "Sea") service which provided transportation by ship, it also announced that the words "air mail" would no longer appear on any U.S. postage stamps. However a stamp denominated for foreign mailing, and showing a small airplane silhouette, is considered to be the final "air mail" issue. It was issued in 2012. While the USPS no longer offers traditional letter air mail, it does provide various classes of "premium" domestic and international business, priority, and express air mail services with guaranteed delivery times at much higher rates.

In June 2006 the USPS formally trademarked Air Mail (two words with capital first letters) along with Pony Express.

== U.S. Army air mail pilots (1918) ==
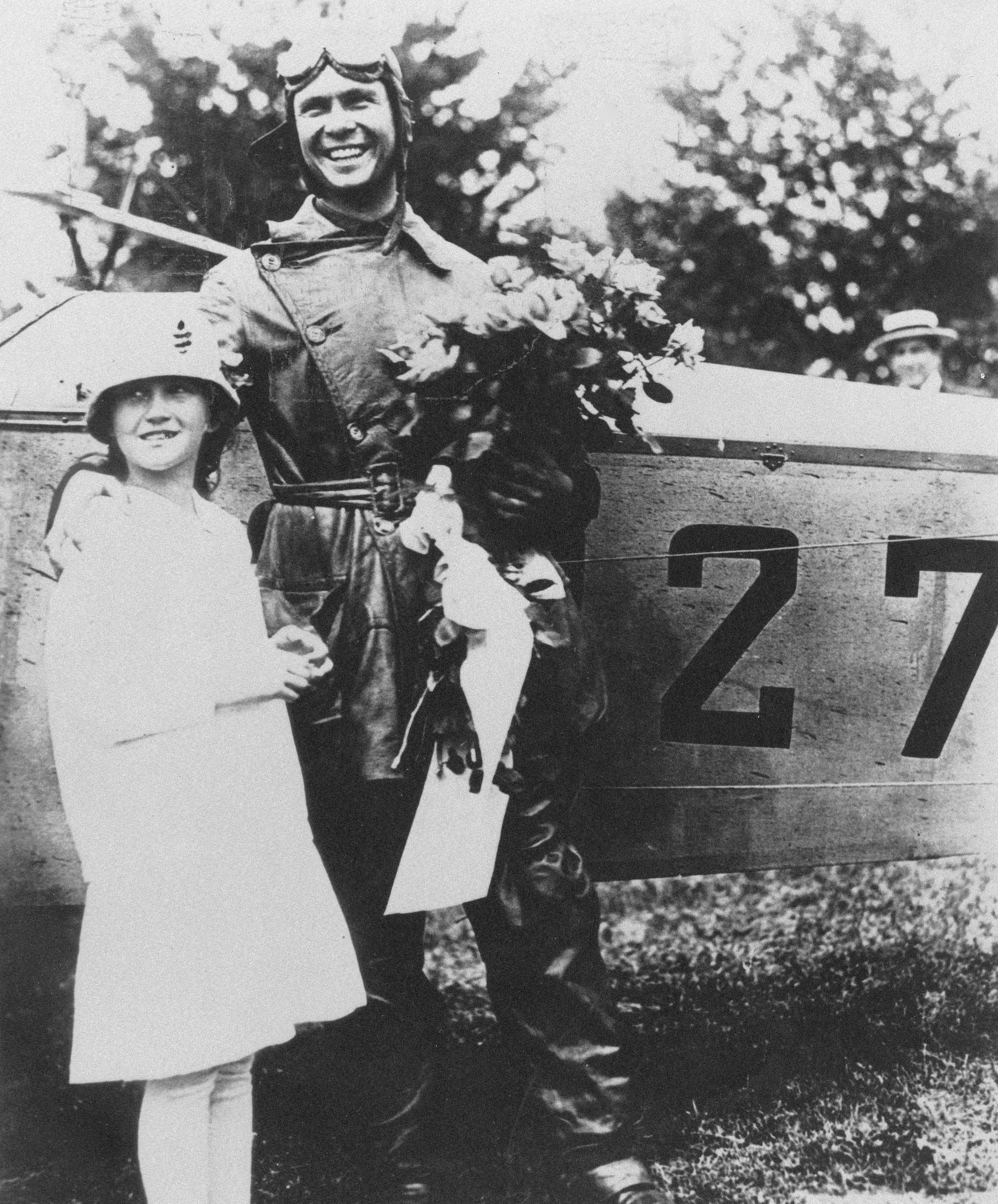
Lt. James C. Edgerton and his sister Elizabeth after finishing the last stretch of the airmail flight from Philadelphia to Washington on May 15, 1918

- 2nd Lt. James Clark Edgerton (1896–1973) As a young Army 2nd Lieutenant fresh out of flight school, Edgerton flew the Philadelphia to Washington, D.C., leg on the first day of scheduled air mail service in the United States on May 15, 1918. Over the next five months as an Army air mail pilot Edgerton flew 52 trips over a total of 7,155 miles, spending 107 hours in the air and making only one forced landing. When the Post Office Department took over flying operations of the Air Mail Service in October 1918, Edgerton stayed on and eventually became Superintendent of Flying Operations. Later he organized and became Superintendent of the Radio Service of the Post Office Department establishing its first aeronautical radio stations, helped to organize a civilian pilot-training program, and as a Colonel during World War II served as executive officer for air operations of the War Department.
- Maj. Reuben Hollis Fleet (1887–1975). He was born on March 6, 1887, in Montesano, Washington. He learned to fly at the Army Aviation school in San Diego, California. By 1918 he was a Major and was supervising pilot training. He then was assigned the task of creating the logistics for regularly scheduled airmail service for three cities. Service began on May 15, 1918. He left the Air Service and in 1923 formed Consolidated Aircraft Corporation. He retired in 1949 and died on October 29, 1975, at age 88.
- 2nd Lt. George Leroy Boyle Also just out of flight school, Boyle flew the first northbound Washington, D.C., to Philadelphia leg on May 15, 1918, but got lost and made a forced landing near Waldorf, Maryland, just 18 minutes after takeoff. After a second failed attempt on May 16 to again fly the mail from Washington to Philadelphia which ended in a crash landing on a Philadelphia golf course, Lt. Boyle was summarily dismissed from the Air Mail service by Maj. Fleet.

== See also ==
- First Air Mail Marker
- Fred S. Robillard
- List of United States airmail stamps
- Transcontinental Airway System
