= Egert =

Egert is a surname. Notable people with the surname include:

- Andy Egert (born 1961), Swiss blues guitarist, harmonica player and singer
- Moisés Egert (born 1977), Brazilian professional football coach
- Tomáš Egert (born 1994), Czech footballer

== See also ==
- Eggert, Anglo-Germanic given name and surname
