= Edgerton =

Edgerton may refer to:

== Places ==
In Canada:

- Edgerton, Alberta

In the United Kingdom:

- Edgerton, Huddersfield, West Yorkshire

In the United States:

- Edgerton, Colorado
- Edgerton, Indiana
- Edgerton, Kansas
- Edgerton, Minnesota
- Edgerton, Missouri
- Edgerton, New York
- Edgerton, Ohio
- Edgerton, Virginia
- Edgerton, Wisconsin
- Edgerton, Wyoming

== People with the given name ==
- Edgerton W. Day (1863–1919), Canadian politician and pioneer
- Edgerton Hartwell (born 1978), American football player
- Peter Throckmorton, born Edgerton Alvord Throckmorton, (1928–1990), American marine archaeologist and writer.

== People with the surname ==
- Alfred Peck Edgerton (1813–1897), American land developer and politician
- Alonzo J. Edgerton (1827–1896), American politician
- Benjamin Hyde Edgerton (1811–1886), American surveyor and politician
- Bill Edgerton (born 1941), American baseball player
- Claude Wilbur Edgerton (1880–1965), American mycologist
- Clyde Edgerton (born 1944), American author
- David Edgerton (1927–2018), founder of Burger King
- David Edgerton (historian) (born 1959), British historian of science
- David R. Edgerton (Ontario politician), Ontario politician and perennial candidate
- Devin Edgerton (born 1970), Canadian ice hockey player
- Edward H. Edgerton (1863–1934), American politician
- Elisha W. Edgerton (1815–1904), American businessman and politician
- Faye Edgerton (1889–1968), Native American Bible translator
- Franklin Edgerton (1885–1963), American linguist
- Glen Edgar Edgerton (1887–1976), former governor of the Panama Canal Zone
- H. K. Edgerton (1948–2026), black heritage activist in North Carolina
- Harold Eugene "Doc" Edgerton (1903–1990), professor of electrical engineering at MIT and noted photographer
- Harry Edgerton, American police officer
- Henry White Edgerton (1888–1970), United States federal judge
- Hiram Edgerton (1847–1922), American businessman and politician
- James A. Edgerton (1869–1938), American poet and politician
- James Clark Edgerton (1896–1973), U.S. Army aviator and Air Mail pilot
- Jim Edgerton (1930–2022), American painting subject
- Joel Edgerton (born 1974), Australian actor
- John Edgerton (1879–1938), American industrialist
- Joseph K. Edgerton (1818–1893), American lawyer and politician
- Khia Edgerton (1978–2008), American DJ, MC, radio personality, and entrepreneur
- Les Edgerton (1943–2023), American author
- Michael Edward Edgerton (born 1961), American composer
- Nash Edgerton (born 1973), Australian actor and film director
- Nathan Huntley Edgerton (1839–1932), American Army officer
- Norman B. Edgerton (1887–1925), American college football coach and physician
- Sarita Edgerton, American politician
- Sidney Edgerton (1818–1900), American politician, lawyer, and judge
- Teresa Edgerton (born 1949), American fantasy author

=== Fictional ===
- Gayle Edgerton, girlfriend of Chamber in Marvel Comics
- Ian Edgerton, FBI agent in the TV series Numb3rs.

== See also ==
- Edgerton, former mansion in Edgerton Park, New Haven, Connecticut
- Egerton (disambiguation)
