= James Edgerton =

James Edgerton may refer to:

- James A. Edgerton (1869–?), American poet, philosopher and political activist
- James Clark Edgerton (1896–1973), U.S. Army aviator
