= Northern Bombing Group =

US unit bombing German U-boat bases in WWI

The Northern Bombing Group consisted of United States Navy and United States Marine Corps squadrons conducting strategic bombing of German U-boat bases along the Belgian coast during World War I. The first United States military unit sent to Continental Europe (France) was the First Aeronautic Detachment of seven naval officers and 122 enlisted men who arrived in France on 5 June 1917. These men became the nucleus of the United States naval aviation forces in Europe. They formulated a strategic bombing plan approved by the Secretary of the Navy on 30 April 1918, but chronic difficulties in obtaining aircraft prevented establishment of an effective bombing campaign before the war ended six months later.

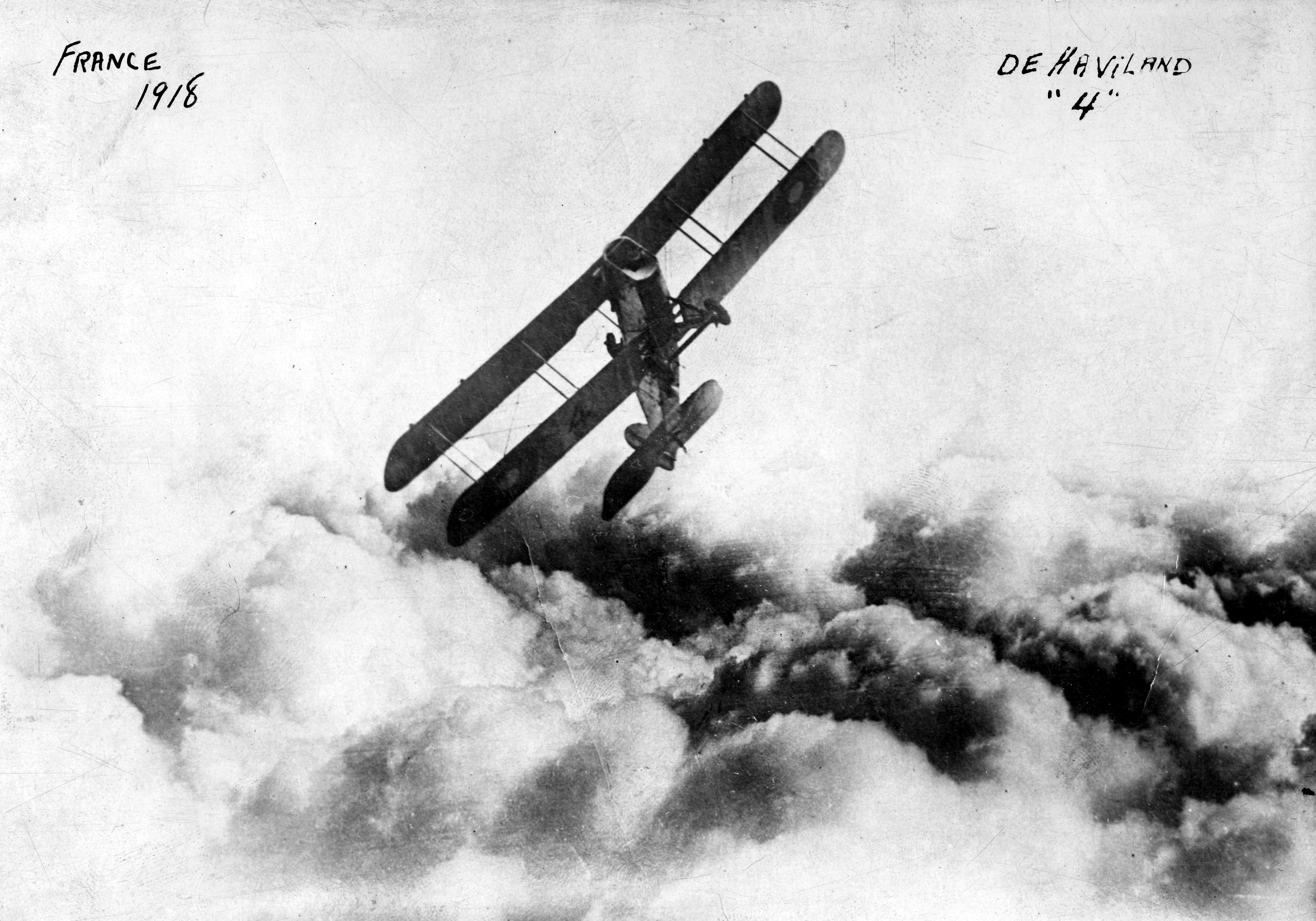
Of an originally planned force of 108 DH.4-day bombers, about a dozen became operational before the end of hostilities.

== Background ==
The Imperial German Navy established Flanders U-boat flotilla in March 1915. Type UB and UC submarines were based in Ostend and Zeebrugge with repair yards at Bruges. These coastal submarines operated in the English Channel, along the English coast of the North Sea and in the Western Approaches. U-boats were sinking over 150 ships per month by late 1916; and the resultant loss of both cargoes and import capacity threatened the ability of the United Kingdom of Great Britain and Ireland to continue the war.

== Concept ==
One of the Allied efforts to reduce shipping losses was a day and night bombing campaign against the bases from which the U-boats operated. United States naval aviators were to establish a Northern Bombing Group headquarters near Ardres for a sustained bombing effort against the U-boat bases. The group was to consist of a day wing and a night wing operating from six aerodromes with a separate repair and supply base, all in the area of Calais and Dunkirk. Each of the six Navy night wing squadrons was to have ten Caproni Ca.5 bombers operating in two flights of five; and each of the six Marine Corps day wing squadrons was to have eighteen Airco DH.4 bombers operating in three flights of six.

== Implementation ==
Difficulty in obtaining aircraft caused reduction of planned strength to four-day squadrons and four night squadrons on 31 May 1918: Night squadrons 1 and 2 were assigned to Saint-Inglevert Airfield (aerodrome A). Night squadrons 3 and 4 were assigned to aerodrome B in Campagne. Aerodrome C in Sangatte was to be built as a dummy but was cancelled after objections by local residents. Day squadrons 7 and 8 were assigned to aerodrome D at Oye-Plage. Day squadrons 9 and 10 were assigned to aerodrome E at Le Frene. Aerodrome F at Alembon served as a bomb dump and was available as a reserve field. By June, the military situation in France raised doubts about the safety of bases; so on 20 July a British site in Eastleigh was designated the repair and supply base where newly delivered aircraft would be assembled and tested.

Caproni had projected delivery of thirty bombers in June and July, and eighty more in August. Only eighteen had been delivered by the end of August, and their Fiat engines were unsatisfactory. Arrangements were made to equip future Caproni deliveries with Isotta Fraschini V.6 engines; but the improved aircraft were not available prior to the First Armistice at Compiègne. Substitution of Handley Page Type O bombers was similarly unsuccessful until after the armistice. The only Northern Bombing Group night raid was made on 15 August 1918 by a single Ca.5 bomber over Ostend; but seven United States Navy pilots and about 40 enlisted men participated in several raids flying two No. 214 Squadron RAF Handley Page bombers. Of an originally projected strength of sixty night bombers, the war ended with six Ca.5s at the night wing aerodromes; and only two of these were operational.

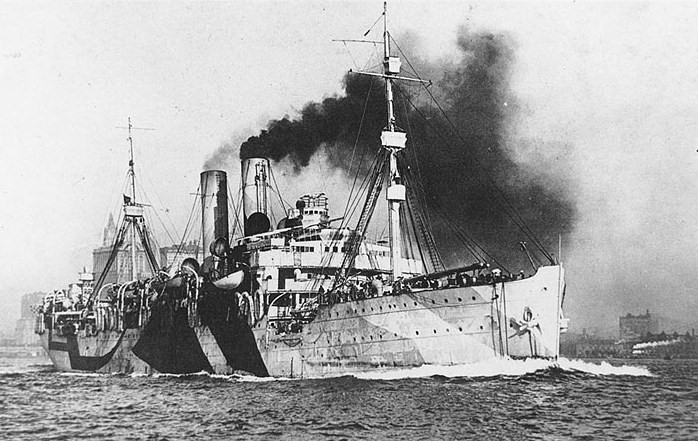
USS DeKalb transported United States Marine Corps pilots of the day wing to France.

Headquarters company and squadrons A, B and C of the First Marine Aviation Force arrived in Brest, France aboard USS DeKalb on 30 July 1918. The squadrons were redesignated as 7, 8 and 9 upon arrival. Prior to the delivery of Northern Bombing Group aircraft, Marine Corps pilots began flying bombing missions in No. 218 Squadron RAF bombers on 9 August 1918, and in No. 217 Squadron RAF bombers on 21 August. The first DH.4-day bomber was delivered on 7 September 1918. As the American DH.4s and substituted Airco DH.9s became operational, they accompanied No. 217 and 218 squadron raids. The first daytime mission undertaken entirely by Northern Bombing Group aircraft was a 14 October raid by day wing squadron 9 dropping seventeen bombs with a total weight of 2,218 pounds (1,006 kg) on the Tielt railway yard. Seven more raids were made by day wing squadrons 8 and 9 before operations were cancelled on 27 October. Two day wing bombers were lost in action; and the war ended with an operational strength of twelve DH.4s and seventeen DH.9s of the originally projected force of 108-day bombers.

== Notable members ==
- William M. Corry Jr.
- Alfred A. Cunningham
- Karl S. Day
- Paul Dickey
- Roy Geiger
- Fred S. Robillard
- Ford O. Rogers
