= Mels =

- Municipality
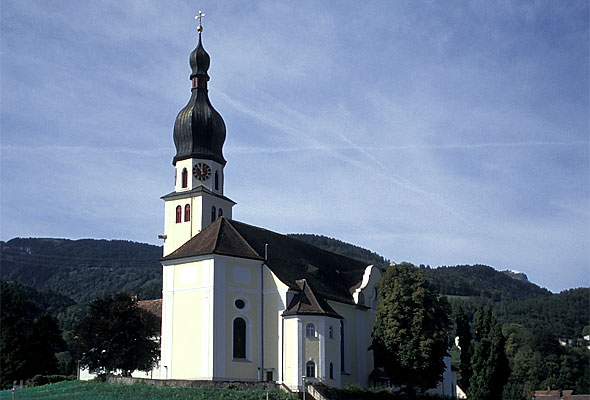

- Flag Coat of arms
- Location of Mels
- Location within Switzerland Location within Canton of St. Gallen
- Coordinates: 47°3′N 9°25′E
- Country: Switzerland
- Canton: St. Gallen
- District: Sarganserland

Government
  - Mayor: Guido Fischer

Area
  - Total: 139.16 km^{2} (53.73 sq mi)
- Elevation: 500 m (1,600 ft)

Population (December 2020)
  - Total: 8,716
  - Density: 62.63/km^{2} (162.2/sq mi)
- Time zone: UTC+01:00 (CET)
  - Summer (DST): UTC+02:00 (CEST)
- Postal code: 8887
- SFOS number: 3293
- ISO 3166 code: CH-SG
- Surrounded by: Bad Ragaz, Fläsch (GR), Flums, Glarus Süd (GL), Pfäfers, Sargans, Vilters-Wangs, Wartau
- Website: mels.ch

Mels is a municipality in the Wahlkreis (constituency) of Sarganserland in the Seeztal, canton of St. Gallen, Switzerland.

== History ==
Mels is first mentioned in 765 as Maile though this comes from a later copy of the original document. In 1018 it was mentioned as Meilis.

== Geography ==
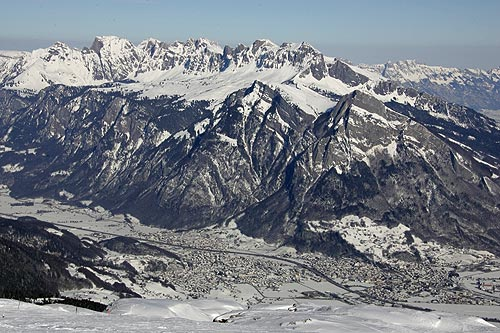
View from Laufböden down toward Mels and Sargans

Aerial view (1968)

Mels has an area, as of 2006, of 139.2 km^{2} (53.7 sq mi). Of this area, 42.6% is used for agricultural purposes, while 29.3% is forested. Of the rest of the land, 2.6% is settled (buildings or roads) and the remainder (25.5%) is non-productive (rivers or lakes).

The municipality is located in the Sarganserland Wahlkreis. In terms of area, it is the largest municipality in the canton and covers the Weisstannen valley and a part of the Seez valley. Northwest of town is Castels hill and west of the Nidberg is Castels fortress. It consists of the village of Mels, the settlements of Heiligkreuz bei Mels, Plons, Ragnatsch, the hamlets of Butz, St. Martin, Mädris and Tils, the alpine settlement of Vermol as well as the Walser villages of Schwendi and Weisstannen.

Chapfensee is a reservoir located in the municipality.

== Coat of arms ==
The blazon of the municipal coat of arms is Azure two Keys Or in saltire.

== Demographics ==
Mels has a population (as of 31 December 2020) of 8,716. As of 2007, about 14.4% of the population was made up of foreign nationals. Of the foreign population, (as of 2000), 30 are from Germany, 228 are from Italy, 563 are from ex-Yugoslavia, 21 are from Austria, 90 are from Turkey, and 144 are from another country. Over the last 10 years the population has grown at a rate of 7.4%. Most of the population (as of 2000) speaks German (90.8%), with Albanian being second most common ( 2.5%) and Italian being third ( 2.2%). Of the Swiss national languages (as of 2000), 7,114 speak German, 10 people speak French, 169 people speak Italian, and 32 people speak Romansh.

The age distribution, as of 2000, in Mels is; 1,073 children or 13.7% of the population are between 0 and 9 years old and 1,137 teenagers or 14.5% are between 10 and 19. Of the adult population, 1,038 people or 13.2% of the population are between 20 and 29 years old. 1,300 people or 16.6% are between 30 and 39, 1,028 people or 13.1% are between 40 and 49, and 889 people or 11.3% are between 50 and 59. The senior population distribution is 641 people or 8.2% of the population are between 60 and 69 years old, 415 people or 5.3% are between 70 and 79, there are 262 people or 3.3% who are between 80 and 89, and there are 54 people or 0.7% who are between 90 and 99.

In 2000 there were 737 persons (or 9.4% of the population) who were living alone in a private dwelling. There were 1,445 (or 18.4%) persons who were part of a couple (married or otherwise committed) without children, and 4,926 (or 62.9%) who were part of a couple with children. There were 344 (or 4.4%) people who lived in single parent home, while there are 60 persons who were adult children living with one or both parents, 50 persons who lived in a household made up of relatives, 31 who lived household made up of unrelated persons, and 244 who are either institutionalized or live in another type of collective housing.

In the 2007 federal election the most popular party was the SVP which received 43.9% of the vote. The next three most popular parties were the CVP (26.5%), the FDP (10.4%) and the SP (10.2%).

In Mels about 65.5% of the population (between age 25–64) have completed either non-mandatory upper secondary education or additional higher education (either university or a Fachhochschule). Out of the total population in Mels, as of 2000, the highest education level completed by 1,853 people (23.6% of the population) was Primary, while 2,780 (35.5%) have completed their secondary education, 586 (7.5%) have attended a Tertiary school, and 355 (4.5%) are not in school. The remainder did not answer this question.

The historical population is given in the following table:

| year | population |
|---|---|
| 1800 | 2,433 |
| 1850 | 3,305 |
| 1900 | 4,035 |
| 1950 | 5,837 |
| 2000 | 7,837 |

== Transportation ==
The municipality is located on the A3 motorway. The A3 national motorway ends at Mels; the portion north toward St. Margrethen and the portion east toward Landquart, Chur, San Bernardino and ultimately Bellinzona are all part of the A13 national motorway.

== Heritage sites of national significance ==
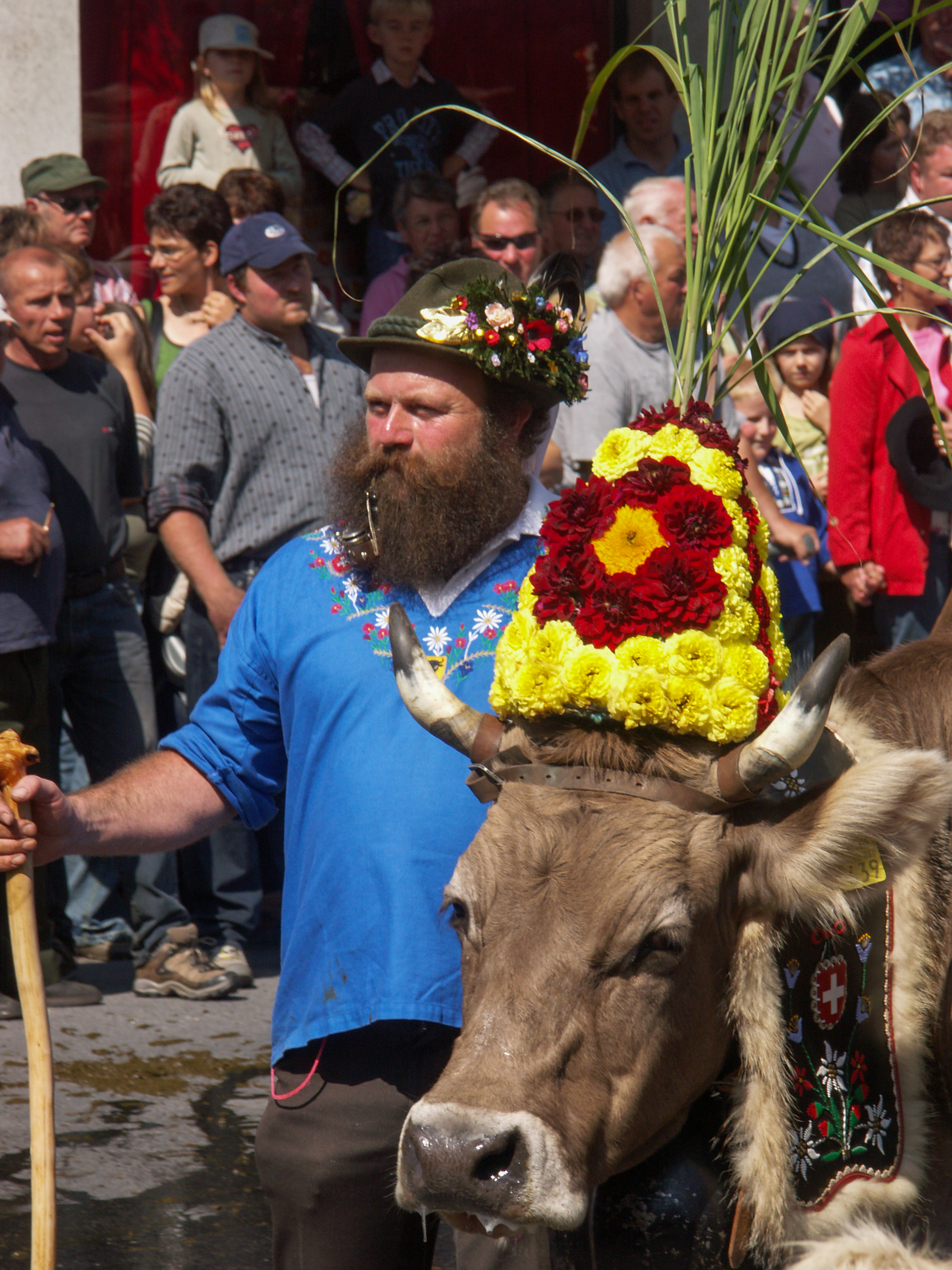
Almabtrieb at Mels in 2007.

Castels hill (which has been occupied from prehistory until the Middle Ages) and the early medieval church of St. Peter und Paul, are listed as Swiss heritage sites of national significance.

== Economy ==
As of 2007, Mels had an unemployment rate of 0.82%. As of 2005, there were 330 people employed in the primary economic sector and about 122 businesses involved in this sector. 722 people are employed in the secondary sector and there are 90 businesses in this sector. 1,932 people are employed in the tertiary sector, with 240 businesses in this sector. As of October 2009 the average unemployment rate was 3.0%. There were 458 businesses in the municipality of which 92 were involved in the secondary sector of the economy while 249 were involved in the third. As of 2000 there were 1,676 residents who worked in the municipality, while 2,270 residents worked outside Mels and 1,457 people commuted into the municipality for work.

== Religion ==
From the 2000 census, 6,089 or 77.7% are Roman Catholic, while 625 or 8.0% belonged to the Swiss Reformed Church. Of the rest of the population, there are 7 individuals (or about 0.09% of the population) who belong to the Christian Catholic faith, there are 144 individuals (or about 1.84% of the population) who belong to the Orthodox Church, and there are 49 individuals (or about 0.63% of the population) who belong to another Christian church. There is 1 individual who is Jewish, and 417 (or about 5.32% of the population) who are Muslim. There are 65 individuals (or about 0.83% of the population) who belong to another church (not listed on the census), 228 (or about 2.91% of the population) belong to no church, are agnostic or atheist, and 212 individuals (or about 2.71% of the population) did not answer the question.

== Trivia ==
Mels was one of the locations in the Swiss-Austrian film Akte Grüninger.

== Notable people ==
People who were born or live in Mels:

- Josef Ackermann (born 1948), chief executive officer of Deutsche Bank
- Paul Guldin (1577–1643), Swiss Mathematician
- Otto Pfister (born 1937), German Football coach
- Paul Good (born 1942), Philosophist
- Andy Egert (born 1961), Swiss Blues Musician
- Doris Ackermann (born 1963), Singer and Song Writer
- Andy Prinz (born 1974), Music producer (e.g. for DJ Tatana)
