= First Air Mail Marker =

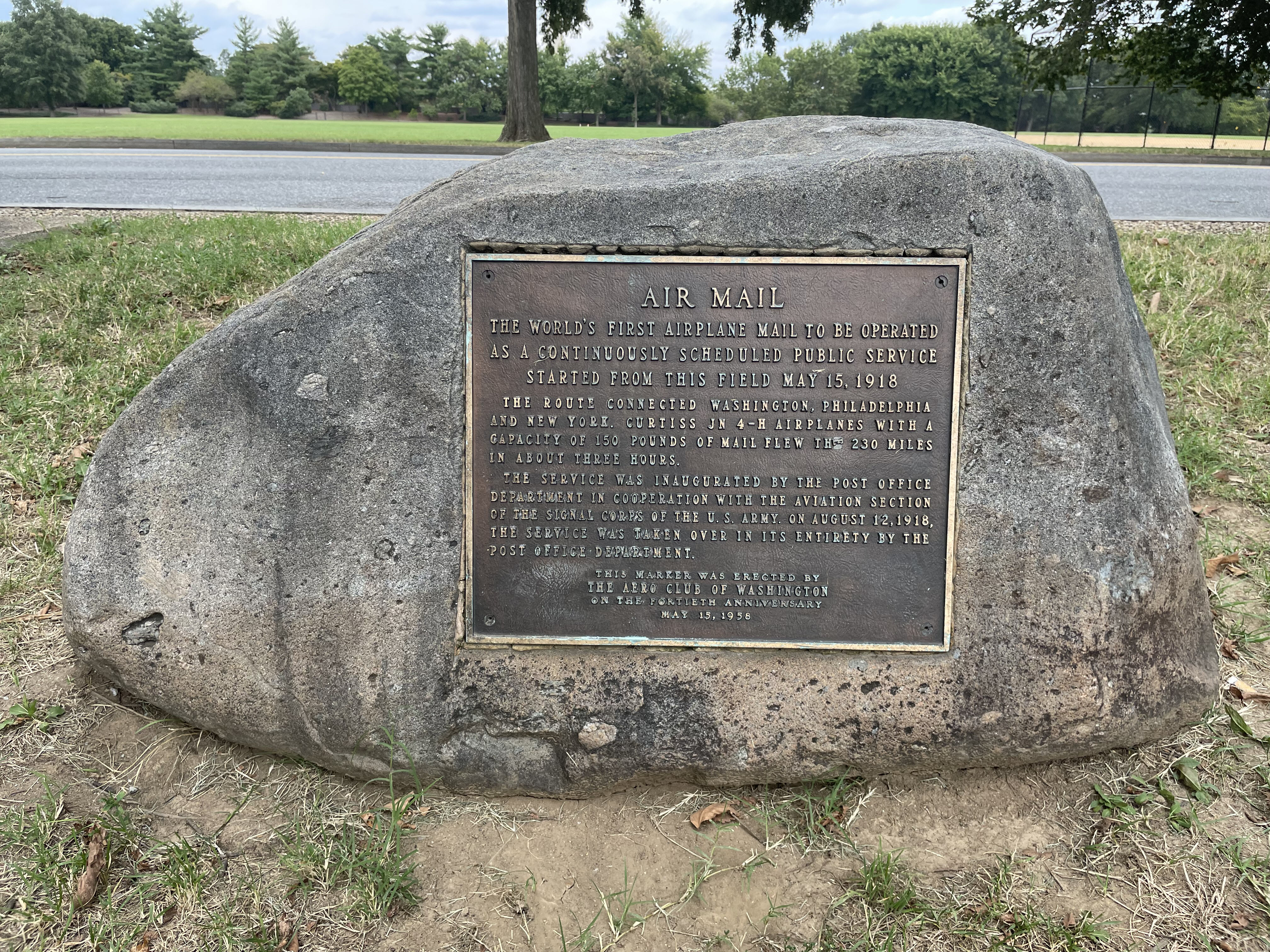
- First Air Mail Marker, along Ohio Drive

- Location within the District of Columbia Location within the United States
- Interactive map of First Air Mail Marker
- 38°52′53.1″N 77°02′36.42″W
- Type: Plaque
- Location: West Potomac Park
- Nearest city: Washington, D.C.

History
- Founded: May 15, 1958

Site notes
- Owner: National Park Service

The First Air Mail Marker is a plaque in West Potomac Park, Washington, D.C. It is located on east shore of the Potomac River beside Ohio Drive. The marker commemorates the first regularly scheduled United States airmail service flight. On May 15, 1918, Lt. George Boyle departed Washington in a Curtiss JN-4H biplane in front of a crowd that included President Woodrow Wilson. Bound for Philadelphia, Boyle became disoriented and landed in a Maryland field. The marker was erected on the flight's fortieth anniversary, May 15, 1958.

== Gallery ==
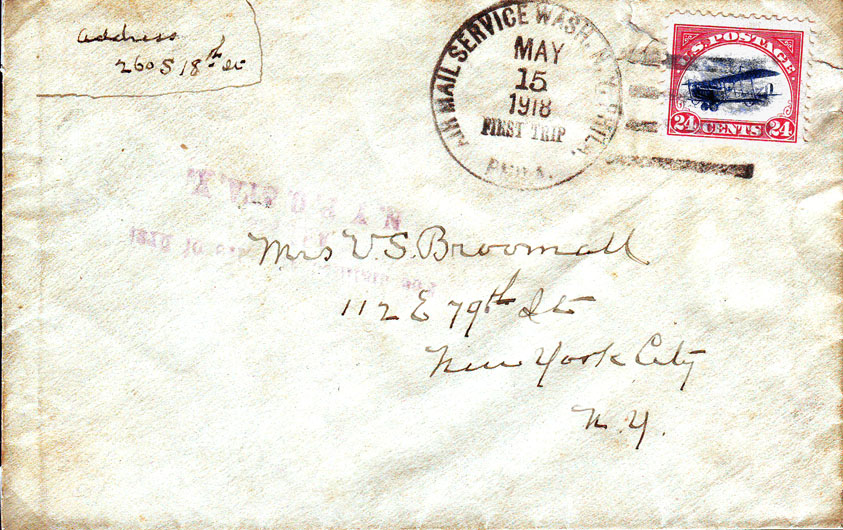
Cover flown on the first flight.

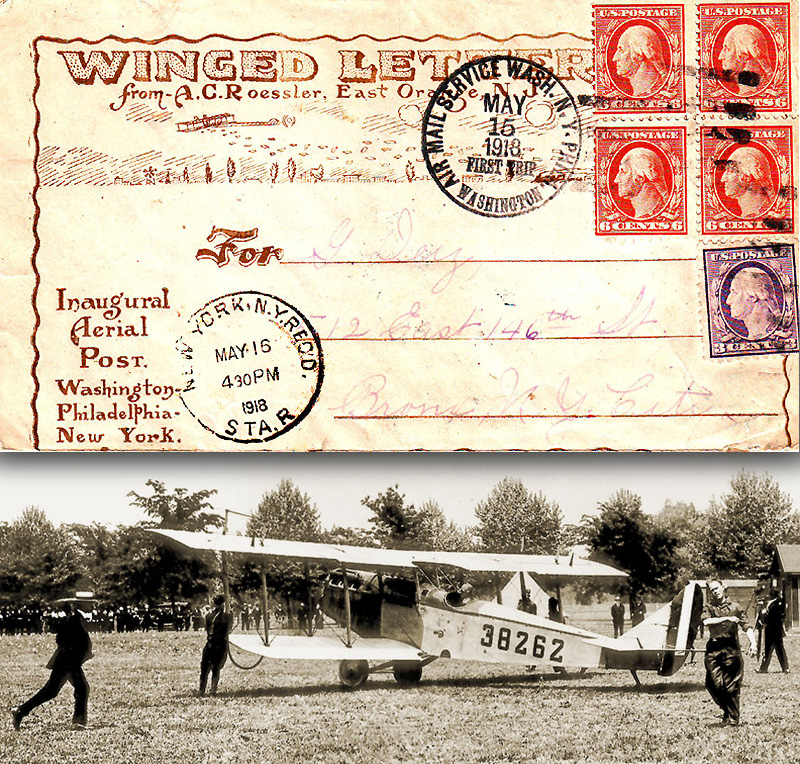
The first flight takes off from Washington, D.C.

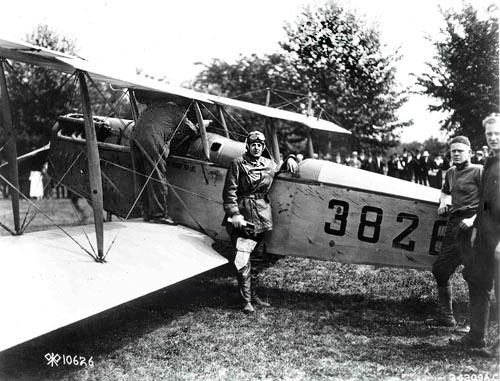
Maj. Ruben Fleet by Lt. Boyle's Jenny before the take off from Washington.
