= Chapfensee =

Reservoir in St. Gallen, Switzerland

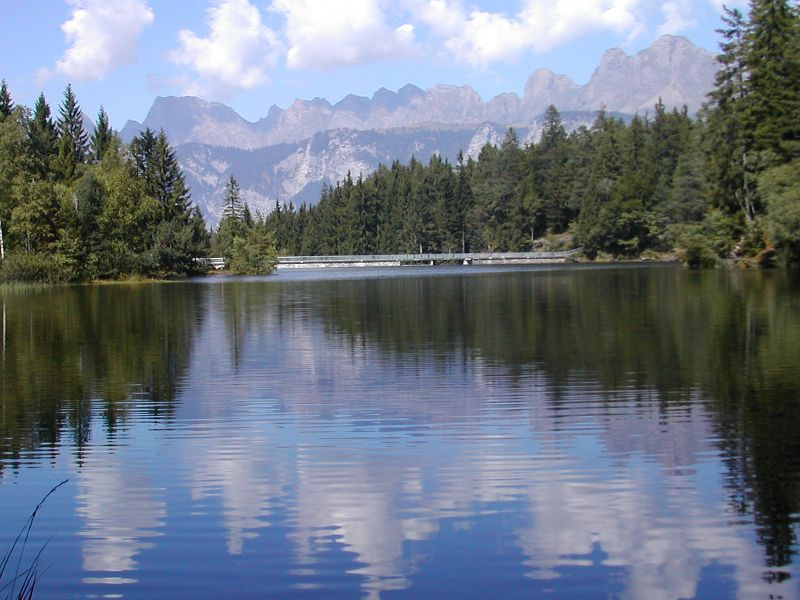

- Location within Canton of St. Gallen Location within Switzerland Location within Alps
- Interactive map of Chapfensee
- Location: Mels, Canton of St. Gallen
- Coordinates: 47°02′52.1″N 9°22′53.6″E
- Type: reservoir
- Surface area: 9 ha (22 acres)
- Water volume: 430,000 m^{3} (350 acre⋅ft)
- Surface elevation: 1,029 m (3,376 ft)

Chapfensee is a reservoir at Mels, Canton of St. Gallen, Switzerland. The area around the reservoir is a nature preserve.

The reservoir was built in 1946/1947 and used to generate power at the plant Plons.

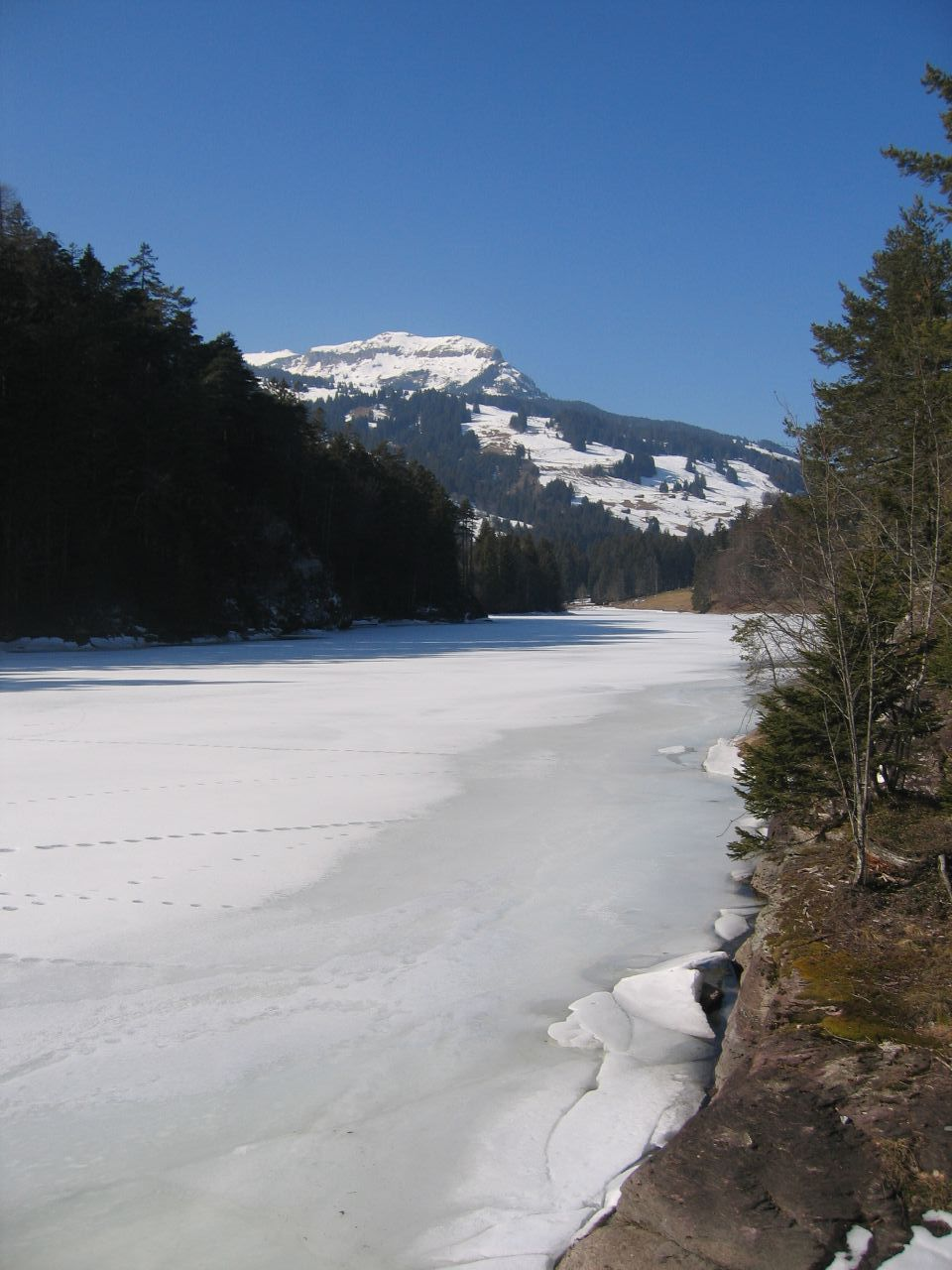
In Winter

== See also ==
- List of mountain lakes of Switzerland
