= James H. Knight =

American pilot (1892–1945)

Jack Knight
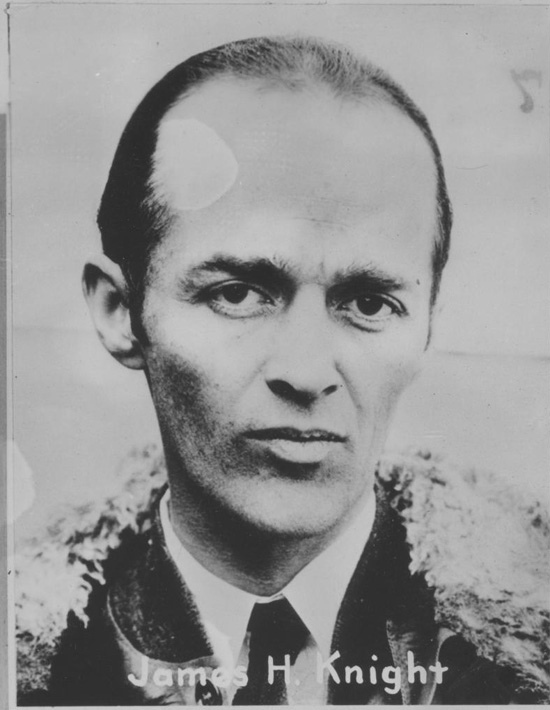
- Born: March 14, 1892; Lincoln Center, Kansas, US
- Died: February 24, 1945 (aged 52); Chicago, Illinois, US
- Spouses: Esther Sullivan; Lois Haag; Florence Jones
- Children: 1
- Aviation career
- Famous flights: "Jack Knight's Night Flight"
- Air force: United States Army Air Service
- Battles: World War I
- Rank: Lieutenant

James Herbert "Jack" Knight (March 14, 1892 – February 24, 1945) was an American pilot who made the first overnight transcontinental air mail delivery. Knight was part of an airmail relay team that flew 2,629 miles across the United States on February 22–23, 1921 in an effort to show that the airmail service was much faster than the railroads. When all the other pilots were weathered-in or broken-down, Knight flew extra relay sections through the night in snow and fog and is credited with saving the airmail service from political decommission. "Jack Knight's Night Flight" made him the most famous pilot in America in the era prior to Charles Lindbergh.

== Early life ==
Knight was born March 14, 1892, in Lincoln Center, Kansas, as James Herbert Brockett. After his mother died in 1893, he and his sister were raised by their aunt and uncle in Buchanan, Michigan. Knight took on their last name, and also picked up the nick-name "Sky" as a child. He worked in Chicago as a mechanical engineer before joining the United States Army Air Service in 1917 to help fight in World War I. Knight became a pilot instructor at Ellington Field in Houston, Texas, and was discharged with the rank of first lieutenant in 1919. After the war ended, he took a job as an airmail pilot based in Nebraska. Knight was a member of First Christian Church in Omaha, Nebraska, where he sang in the choir.

== Airmail ==
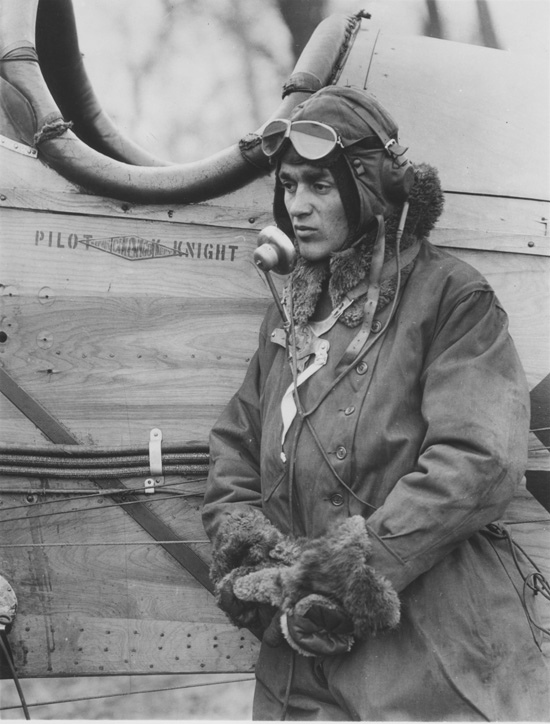
Knight testing early air-to-ground radio

The U.S. transcontinental mail route began operating in September 1920. But, since pilots did not fly after dark, the mail was transferred to a railcar to travel during the night. At dawn, a waiting plane would take the mail sacks and fly on. However, newly elected president, Warren Harding, and some Congressmen began to talk openly about ending federal airmail subsidies. Questions of safety of flying the mail were not without merit. In the prior three years 17 airmail service pilots had died in crashes traced to mechanical or weather-related causes. Airmail pilots at the time virtually flew by the seat of their pants. Their instrument panel only included a magnetic compass for navigation which oscillated from north to south in rough weather. They also flew dangerously low in bad weather, skimming rivers, railroad tracks, and towns at treetop level in order to see where they were going.

Consequently, Postmaster General Burleson and his Chief of the Airmail Service Otto Praeger devised a plan to demonstrate airmail's potential. They would have mail flown across the country completely by air, without using the railroad, and chose George Washington's birthday February 22, 1921, for the all-air cross-country test. This flight would not be an easy task for the pilots flying in unprotected cockpits as it would be difficult for pilots to find visual landmarks at night.

=== "Jack Knight's Night Flight" ===
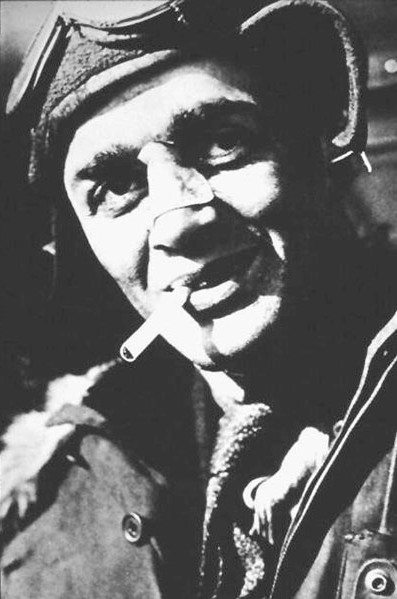
Knight with the broken nose he had during his night-flight

On the morning of February 22, 1921, two mail planes left Hazelhurst Field on Long Island, New York, heading west, while two other planes left Marina Field on San Francisco's Presidio flying east. Relay planes waited at the regularly scheduled stops in between. Knight was waiting in North Platte, Nebraska, to continue the east-bound leg with a broken nose he received from a crash the week before in his de Havilland DH-4B mail plane. Fellow pilot Frank Yeager flew the leg from Cheyenne, Wyoming, to North Platte where Knight was waiting, but Knight was delayed while a damaged tailskid was repaired. Knight departed for Omaha, Nebraska, at 10:44pm not knowing that the relief pilot scheduled to meet him in Omaha was stuck in a snowstorm in Chicago. That same storm had also stopped the other westbound pilot, whose mail was being loaded onto a train. Knight was unaware that he was the only pilot left flying and that the future of airmail could depend on him.

Through the cold night he was able to see signal fires lit by post office employees, airfield managers, and even local farmers. "I felt as if I had a thousand friends on the ground, Lexington, Kearney, Grand Island, Columbus, Fremont slipped by, warm glows of well-wishers beneath the plane's wing. And then, I saw the lights of Omaha" he stated about that first leg. Landing at Omaha after 1:00AM on the 22nd, Knight learned that he was the only pilot still flying, as the east bound leg had also been grounded by the snowstorm. However, after warming himself, Knight chose to continue the flight, despite the threatening storm and the fact that he had never flown east of Omaha. Knight departed at 2:00AM for the next leg of the flight to Des Moines, Iowa.

Following more fires and other landmarks across Iowa, Knight flew the next leg through Des Moines, Iowa, where snow prevented a landing, and then another 120 miles to Iowa City. At Iowa City, everyone had gone home believing the planes had been grounded due to the weather. The airport night-watchman was the only one there and heard the plane coming. He set out two railroad flares to mark the airport and could see the plane lining up for landing. In the -12 °F (-24 °C) stopover, Knight left the engine running for fear it wouldn't restart, drank some coffee, ate a ham sandwich, refueled, and departed at 6:30AM for the final 200 miles to Chicago. At 8:40AM, Knight reached Chicago's Checkerboard Field. His all-night flight had covered 830 miles and he had found his way using a basic compass and a small, torn section of road map. Newspaper reporters were waiting for Knight in Chicago, and his flight made front-page headlines nationwide. Knight admitted later that his broken nose, sub-zero temperatures, frozen wind and bumpy air made the flight especially brutal.

The papers extensively wrote about "Jack Knight's Night Flight" making him the most famous pilot in the Pre-Lindbergh era. Fellow airmail pilot and friend, Slonnie Sloniger, always greeted him with "Jack Knight the guy who saved the night mail", as if it were all part of his name.

Although Knight was credited with the achievement, the flight was a collective effort, as two other pilots continued to New York. In total, seven pilots participated in the transcontinental flight, which covered 2,629 miles (3,652 kilometers) in 33 hours and 20 minutes. The flight and the public attention it received helped secure congressional appropriations for the airmail service.

== Later life ==
After becoming a household name, Knight worked with the Postal Service and local civic leaders to set up a system of navigational beacons and emergency landing strips. Knight ended up the top airmail pilot with over 417,000 miles flown in the airmail service when it was disbanded on September 1, 1927, and put out for bids to the private sector. He then went on to work for Boeing Air Transport which became United Airlines in 1934. Knight continued with United, eventually flying DC-3 passenger flights and later becoming vice-president of Safety. Knight had a vacation cottage in Dune Acres, Indiana, on the shores of Lake Michigan.

At the outbreak of World War II, Knight joined the Civil Aeronautics Administration working in airway development. That dove-tailed into a position with the Defense Support Corporation which procured material for the war effort. While working with a team in the Amazon jungle looking for sources of rubber, Knight contracted malaria.

== Death and honors ==
The malaria contracted in South America had weakened him to the point he was unable to recover after a serious fall. Knight died on February 24, 1945, in Chicago. His ashes were scattered over Lake Michigan.

In 1999, Knight was enshrined in the Michigan Aviation Hall of Fame. In 1950, a children's book titled "Pilot Jack Knight" was written by A.M. Anderson and R.E. Johnson.
