= Egerton =

Egerton may refer to:

== People ==
- Egerton (name), a list of people with either the surname or the given name
- Egerton family, a British aristocratic family
- George Egerton, pen name of Mary Dunne Bright (1859–1945), Australian-born writer

== Places ==
- Egerton, Cheshire, England
- Egerton, Greater Manchester, England
- Egerton, Kent, England
- Egerton, Melton Mowbray, ward in Leicestershire, England
- Egerton, Nova Scotia, Canada
- Egerton, Southgate, Ontario, Canada
- Mount Egerton, Victoria, Australia

== Other uses ==
- Baron Egerton, a title in the Peerage of the United Kingdom created in 1859
- Egerton University, Njoro, near Nakuru, Kenya
- Egerton (tug), a number of tugs with this name

== See also ==
- Egerton Collection, a notable collection of manuscripts in the British Library
- Egerton Gospel, fragments of an unknown Gospel found in Egypt
- Egerton Lodge, listed building in Melton Mowbray, England
- Egerton Park, cricket ground in Melton Mowbray, England
- Edgerton (disambiguation)
