= Andy Egert =

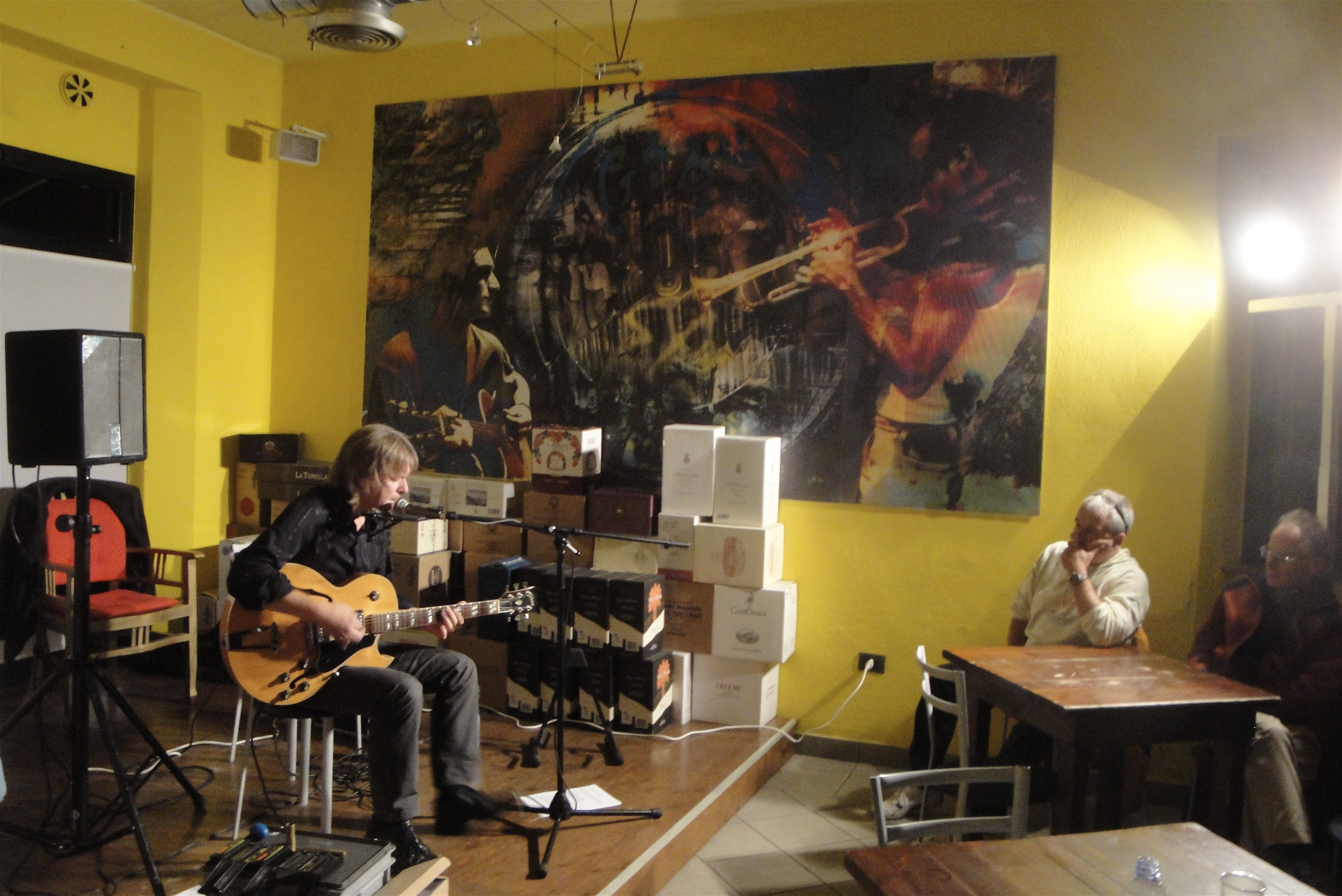
- Egert performing in 2009

Background information
- Born: Andreas Egert; 24 July 1961 (age 64); Mels, Switzerland
- Genres: Blues
- Occupations: Musician, songwriter
- Instruments: Guitar, harmonica, vocals
- Years active: 1980–present
- Label: Brambus Records
- Website: www.andyegert.ch

Andreas "Andy" Egert (born 24 July 1961) is a Swiss blues guitarist, harmonica player and singer.

Egert, who started his career around 30 years ago as a street musician, is mainly a live performing artist who does around 100 live performances a year. He has also performed live in Germany, Italy, the Netherlands, Austria, Lithuania, the United States, Poland and Panama, under his own name or in collaborations with blues singers such as Bob Stroger, Robert Lucas and Dallas Hodge.

Egert was awarded the Swiss Blues Award in 2010.

== Biography ==
Egert was born in Mels, Switzerland, as the fifth of eight children. He started to play the guitar at the age of 19. However, when starting his first band "The Cool" in 1980 he initially played bass. At that time the band's music was mainly rock, influenced by bands like Led Zeppelin, Deep Purple and Cream. His interest in blues came only a bit later, almost by accident, through a Swiss Radio program called "Just The Blues".

In 1982, Egert started pursuing music full-time. He left the band to start touring Europe as a street musician, equipped only with an acoustic guitar. Despite difficulties and bad experiences, such as being robbed of everything except his guitar, he carried on and ended up travelling the streets of Europe for the next two years.

Returning home he started his next band where he was the band leader, bass player and singer of the three piece blues-rock band 'Express' which lasted from 1984 to 1987. During that time in 1985 he finally made the switch back to guitar. With 'Express' he performed extensively, mainly by touring in Switzerland and Italy. In 1988, with his new band 'No Comment', another three piece blues rock band, he made his first studio recording, the 45 single "Hold On". In 1989, he created the 'Andy Egert Blues Band' his current band. With this band he recorded his first album (1990, Andy Egert Blues Band).

In the years following he toured again, this time mainly in Switzerland, the Netherlands and Germany, playing over 70 gigs in 1994. Back in 1990, Egert had started adding solo gigs, rekindling his years as a street musician, to his performance schedule. In addition to this he also sporadically played in a purely acoustic guitar and bass duo with his brother Martin. The result of this was their 1998 album Blues with a Feeling. Andy Egert's fourth album (Live, Brambus Records, 1999) was his first internationally released CD.

Subsequent years of extensive touring increased his exposure and he appeared at several well established music festivals in Italy (Mantova Jazz Festival), Poland (Suwalki Blues Festival) and Switzerland (Blue Balls Festival Lucerne, Piazza Blues Festival, Bellinzona).

In 2000, Egert undertook his first Chicago Blues Tour with Bob Stroger. Many other Chicago Blues Tours, mainly throughout Switzerland, were to follow over the next decade. In addition, he also started collaborating with Canned Heat slide guitarist and singer Robert Lucas, for tours and gigs in 2000, 2007 and 2008. Lucas died in November 2008.

Another collaborative project with Dallas Hodge, himself another ex-Canned Heat member started in 2010.

In March 2010, Egert appeared at the Basel Blues Festival where he was awarded with the Swiss Blues Award.

In March 2012, Egert and Stroger played at the Boquete Jazz & Blues Festival in Panama.

== Style ==
Egert has been influenced by famous American and English blues players such as Johnny Winter, Robert Johnson, Alvin Lee and Eric Clapton.

His guitar style has been mostly influenced by Freddie King. His way of playing, a powerful but clean guitar sound, the variability and dynamic range of his sound recalls to some extent the recordings of Freddie King.

Egert describes his style as: "Blues with a feeling".

== Equipment ==
Egert's main equipment consists of a set of Hohner Marine Band blues harps, a semi acoustic Gibson ES-335 and a Marshall JCM-800 top-box amplifier.

== Discography ==
=== Albums ===
| Albums | Year |
|---|---|
| Andy Egert Blues Band | 1990 |
| Rough and Ready | 1994 |
| Blues with a Feeling | 1998 |
| Live | 1999 |
| Andy Egert Blues Band feat Bob Stroger | 2002 |
| Fire on the Crossroad | 2005 |
| I'm a Bluesman (Live) | 2008 |

=== Further works ===
| Other Work | Collaboration |
|---|---|
| Another Rainy Day (1993) | Various Swiss rock & blues bands |
| 7. Int. Dixie-& Jazz Festival Sargans (1998) | VA: Louisiana Red, Eroll Dixon, Oscar Klein, Lillian Boutté & others |
| Rockin' All Over Key North (2004) | Various Swiss rock & blues Bands |
| Lucerne Blues Festival (2005) | James Cotton, Ronnie Baker Brooks, Bob Stroger, Billy Boy Arnold & others |
| Piekarskie Wiczory Bluesowe Vol. 1 (2006) | John "Broadway" Tucker, Ian Paice, Earl Green, Carl Palmer, Vance Kelly & others |
| Piekarskie Wiczory Bluesowe Vol. 2 (2008) | Phil Guy, Rob Tognoni, Candye Kane, Steve Fister, Alan Withe & others |
| Bob Stroger and Friends (2009) | Bob Stroger, Billy Flinn, James Wheeler, Ken Saydak & others |
