= Michael Eggert (businessman) =

Danish businessman (born 1975)

- Born: 12 July 1975 (age 51); Middelfart, Denmark
- Education: Copenhagen Business School
- Occupation: Serial Entrepreneur
- Spouse: Malene Kaalund
- Children: Ella Kaalund Eggert Lili Lou Kaalund Eggert
- Parent(s): Ole Eggert and Jette Urup

Michael Eggert (born 12 July 1975) is an entrepreneur from Copenhagen, Denmark. Eggert is the founder and managing partner of several companies, amongst others Studerende Online (bought by the Danish media corporation Det Berlingske Officin in 2001), Softdetect Systems, EC Group, Lejebolig.dk, Erhvervslokaler.dk and more.

Eggert is active in the goal for a more transparent rental market in Denmark. He founded the business organisation FDOB in 2005 with the aim of creating a set of business ethical guidelines for the online classifieds business with focus on rental properties.

Eggert is an often used source in Danish media coverage of the rental market, the market for housing co-operatives and the market for corporate properties.
