= Eggert Munch =

Norwegian painter (1685–1764)

Eggert Munch (c.1685 – 2 September 1764) was a Norwegian painter.

He was born in Vaage in Gudbrandsdalen. Judged by his works, or works attributed to him, Munch is regarded among the most productive and important painters of Norwegian heritage in the 18th century, according to art historian Øivind Storm Bjerke. Among his works are altarpieces in churches in Halden, Vestre Toten, Torpa, and Nordre Land.
