= 1918 Curtiss Jenny airmail stamps =

American postage series

Curtiss Jenny Airmail Stamps
- Type: Airmail stamp
- Country of issue: United States
- Country of production: United States
- Designer: Clair Aubrey Huston
- Engraver: Edward Weeks (frame), Marcus W. Baldwin (vignette)
- Printer: Bureau of Engraving and Printing
- Dimensions: 2.54 cm X 2.54 cm
- Perforation: 11
- Commemorates: U.S. Army's Curtiss airplane
- Depicts: U.S. Army's Curtiss airplane
- Notability: first U.S. airmail stamp, world's first definitive airmail stamp, first bicolored airmail stamp, first airmail stamp printed with an error, first airmail stamp produced for a regular service
- Face value: 6¢, 16¢, 24¢

The 1918 Curtiss Jenny Air Mail Stamps were a set of three Airmail postage stamps issued by the United States in 1918. The 24¢ variety was the first of the stamps to be issued, and was in fact, America's first Airmail stamp. (The world's first airmail stamp was issued by Italy in 1917). The 16¢ and 6¢ varieties were issued later in the year to reflect reductions in the postage rate. It features the image of the Curtiss JN-4 airplane.

The order of the Scott Catalog numbers for these stamps (C1 through C3) is the inverse of the order of release dates for the stamps.

== Individual stamp designs ==
Design	Scott Catalog Numbers	Date of Issue	Image
6¢ Curtiss Jenny	C1	Dec. 10, 1918	6¢ Curtiss Jenny
16¢ Curtiss Jenny	C2	July 11, 1918	16¢ Curtiss Jenny
24¢ Curtiss Jenny	C3	May 13, 1918	24¢ Curtiss Jenny

== Inverted Jenny error ==
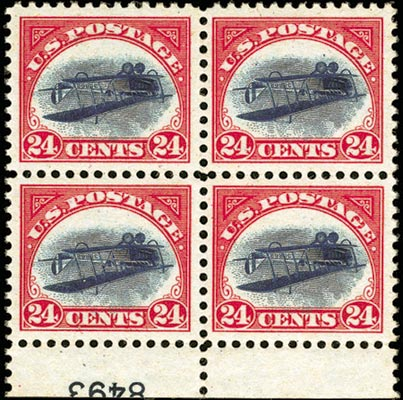
The unique plate block, Positions 87-88 and 97-98, original gum previously hinged, owned by Stuart Weitzman as of March 11, 2021.

A single sheet of 100 of the two-color 24¢ was printed with the center design inverted, thus creating the Inverted Jenny.
