= Egerton (tug) =

A number of tugs have been named Egerton, including:

- ST Egerton (1911), a tug built in 1911, served with the Royal Navy in World War I
- ST Egerton (1943), a British tug in service 1947–61
- MV Egerton (1965), a diesel-powered tug in service 1965–90 (UK ON:306510)
- MV Egerton (1969), a diesel-powered tug in service since 1991 (IMO:7006144)
