= Otto Praeger =

American journalist and Postmaster

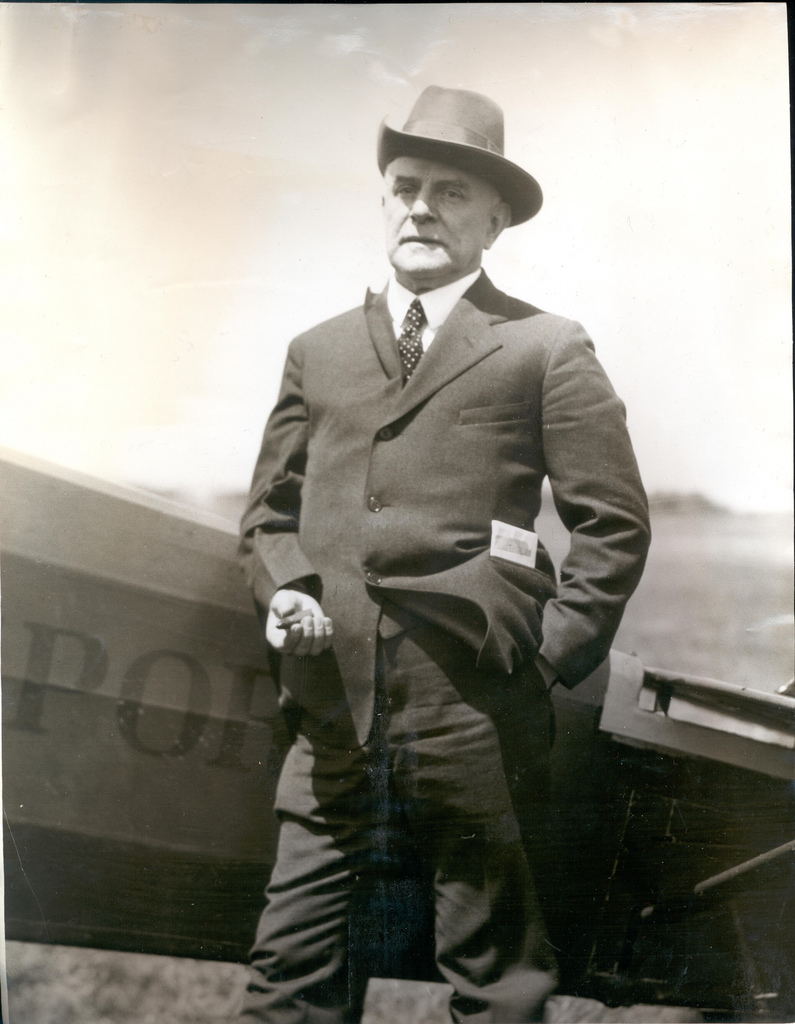
- Otto Praeger, circa 1920

Second Assistant United States Postmaster General
- In office September 1, 1915 – March 1921
- President: Woodrow Wilson
- Succeeded by: Paul Henderson

Personal details
- Born: February 27, 1871 Victoria, Texas
- Died: February 4, 1948 (aged 76) Washington, D.C.
- Spouse(s): Ann C. Hardesty and Carrie Will Coffman
- Education: University of Texas
- Occupation: Journalist, Postmaster

Otto Praeger (February 27, 1871 – February 4, 1948) was the Washington, D.C., postmaster from 1913 to 1915 and was the Second Assistant United States Postmaster General from 1915 to 1921. He was responsible for implementing airmail from 1918 to 1927.

== Biography ==
Praeger was born in Victoria, Texas, on February 27, 1871, to Herman Praeger and Louisa Schultze. He attended the public schools in San Antonio, Texas, then the University of Texas. In 1889 he started work as a newspaper reporter, then an editor, and he worked in journalism until 1914. He married Annie C. Hardesty on February 27, 1897. He married Carrie Will Coffman on April 20, 1928.

On April 1, 1913, Praeger became the postmaster for Washington, D.C., remaining in that position until September 1, 1915, when he became Second Assistant Postmaster General of the United States. On May 15, 1918, Postmaster General Albert S. Burleson assigned him additional duty as chief of the U.S. Airmail Service, telling Praeger, "The airmail once started must not stop, but must be constantly improved and expanded until it would become, like the steamship and the railroad, a permanent transportation feature of the postal service."

For a brief period in the summer of 1918, the United States Army Air Service provided the pilots and planes for the airmail service, but then the Post office department, dissatisfied with the discipline of Army pilots and the quality of their equipment, began to hire its own pilots and acquire its own planes. However, this effort resulted in the hiring of ex-Army pilots and the purchase of ex-Army aircraft. Admonishing the pilots never to perform stunts while flying mail planes, he insisted that they follow fixed schedules regardless of the weather, and a contentious relationship developed between Praeger and the pilots. The first sign of trouble came on November 18, 1918, when two mail pilots, Eddie Gardner and Robert Shank, refused to take off from Belmont Field on Long Island due to fog and Praeger ordered them to take off immediately anyway. After they did, but then returned to the airfield shortly and parked their plane, saying it was too dangerous to fly. Praeger immediately fired them, although they were rehired two months later.

On July 22, 1919, angered by Praeger's insistence that they fly their routes on time even in zero visibility weather or be fired – a policy that had resulted in 15 crashes and two fatalities in the previous two weeks alone – U.S. Airmail Service pilots begin a spontaneous strike. After Praeger and the United States Post Office Department received much negative comment in the press, the strike ended in less than a week when the Post Office Department agreed that officials in Washington, D.C., would no longer insist on pilots flying in dangerous weather conditions.

On December 10, 1919, Praeger testified before the United States House Committee on Post Offices and Post Roads, where he requested US$3 million for the creation and operation of airmail routes between New York City and San Francisco, Pittsburgh and Milwaukee, New York and Atlanta, and St. Louis and Minneapolis.

In September 1920, under Praeger's guidance, the Post Office Department established the first transcontinental air mail route in the United States. However, the United States lacked a system of lighted navigation beacons, making it too dangerous for air mail pilots to fly at night, and trains carried the mail along the route during the hours of darkness. As a result, transcontinental air mail was not much faster – and considerably more expensive – than transcontinental mail service entirely by train. Praeger understood the dangers of night flying, but wanted to demonstrate its feasibility before President Warren G. Harding took office and appointed his successor. He therefore staged a set of experimental day-and-night mail flights between New York City and San Francisco, California – two eastbound and two westbound – in February 1921. Not a pilot and, as a native of Texas, unfamiliar with winter weather in the northern and western United States, Praeger probably did not fully understand the danger the flights posed to his pilots. The two westbound flights become stranded in Dubois, Pennsylvania, and Chicago, Illinois. The first eastbound flight ended in tragedy when the de Havilland DH-4B carrying the mail stalled and crashed after takeoff from Elko, Nevada. The only real success was by the second eastbound flight, whose pilot managed to fly a night leg from North Platte, Nebraska, to Chicago.

After Harding's inauguration on March 4, 1921, Praeger was succeeded as Second Assistant Postmaster General by Paul Henderson in March 1921. By the following year, he was an employee of Commercial Aeronautics General in New York City.

Despite the often adversarial nature of the relationship between Praeger and his airmail pilots, during a radio interview years later Praeger praised the pilots for their heroics in flying under difficult conditions to deliver the mail. He died of a heart attack in Washington, D.C., on February 4, 1948.
