= James Clark Edgerton =

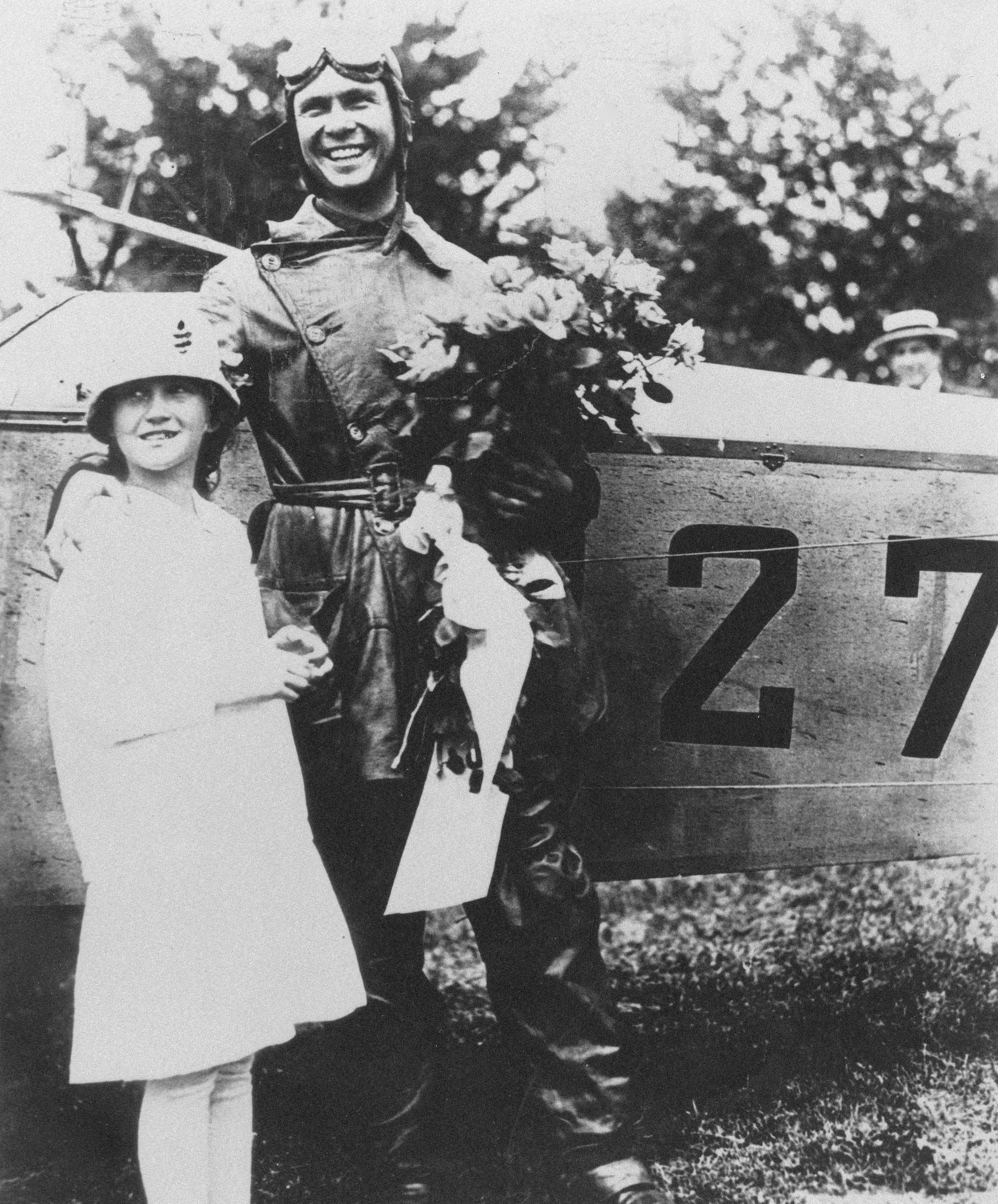
Lt. James C. Edgerton and his sister, Elizabeth, after finishing the first Air Mail flight from Philadelphia to Washington on May 15, 1918.

James Clark Edgerton (February 2, 1896 – October 26, 1973) was a U.S. Army aviator and Air Mail pilot who as a young lieutenant flew the Philadelphia to Washington, D.C., leg on the first day of scheduled Air Mail service in the United States on May 15, 1918. Edgerton, who retired as a colonel, was also credited with being the first pilot ever to fly into a thunderstorm and with devising the first fire-extinguishing system installed for an aircraft engine. He also helped to organize a civilian pilot-training program and during World War II he served as executive officer for air operations of the War Department.

During his first Air Mail flight from Philadelphia to Washington Edgerton flew into a thunderstorm at 10,000 feet. "One instant the airplane became a tremendous elevator, leaping skyward hundreds of feet," Edgerton noted after landing at the Polo Grounds in Washington, "then the bottom promptly falls out, dizzy fall of hundreds of feet. I was attacked by solid waves of air."

Edgerton flew 52 trips over a total of 7,155 miles, spending 107 hours in the air and making only one forced landing as an Army Air Mail pilot. When the Post Office Department took over flying operations of the Air Mail Service later in 1918, Edgerton stayed with the service eventually becoming the Superintendent of Flying Operations. Later he organized and became superintendent of the Radio Service of the Post Office Department establishing its first aeronautical radio stations.

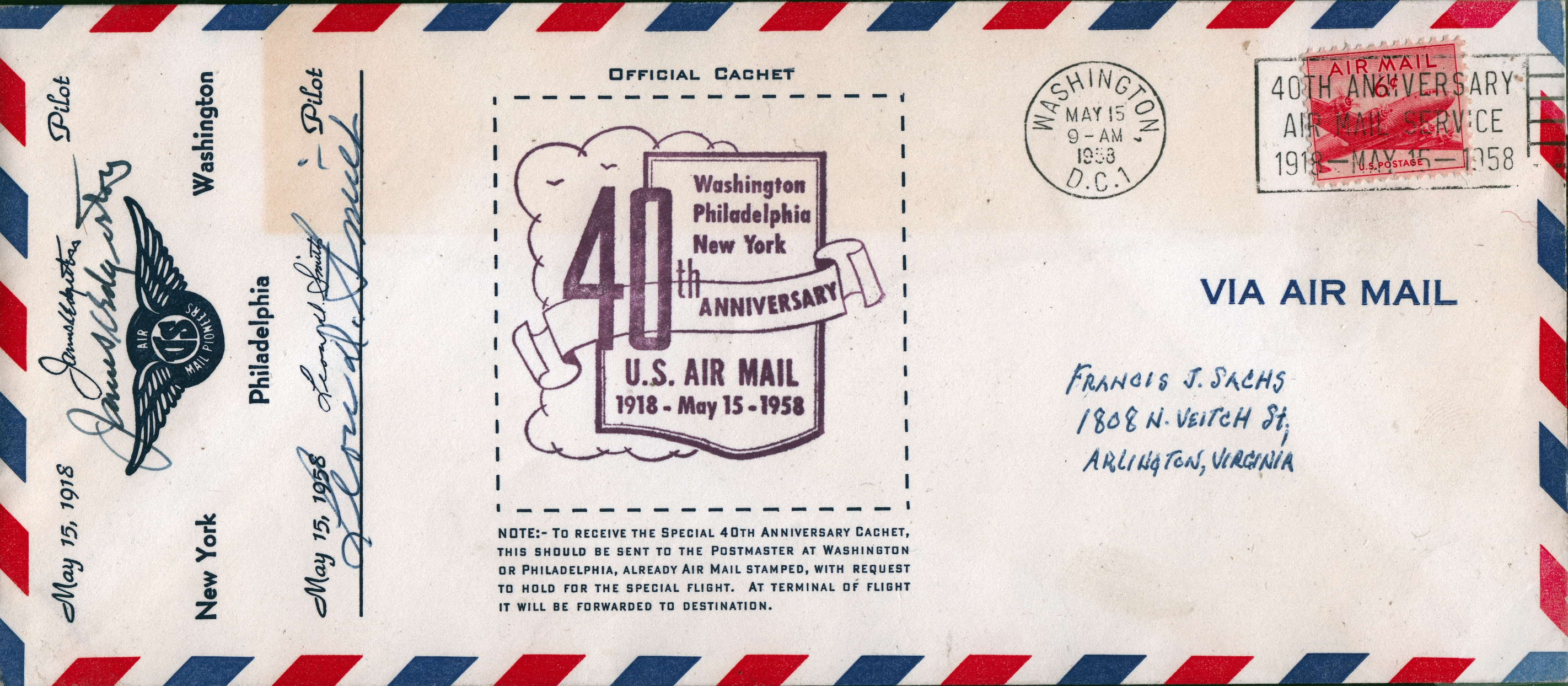
Flown Washington-Philadelphia-New York 40th Anniversary U.S. Air Mail cover autographed by James C. Edgerton and Leon D. Smith, Pilots, May 15, 1958
