= Lewis Dening =

British Indian Army officer (1848–1911)

Lieutenant-General Sir Lewis Dening KCB DSO
- Born: 1848
- Died: 16 February 1911 (aged 62–63); Jubbulpore, India
- Spouse(s): Eliza Eales (m. 1872–1876) Beatrice Scott (m. 1877)
- Children: 8
- Military career
- Allegiance: United Kingdom
- Branch: British Indian Army
- Service years: 1867–1911
- Rank: Lieutenant-general
- Unit: Bengal Staff Corps
- Commands: 1st Sikh Infantry; 26th Punjab Infantry; Hyderabad Contingent; Jubbulpore Brigade; Burma Division
- Conflicts: Second Anglo-Afghan War; Third Anglo-Burmese War; Anglo-Egyptian conquest of Sudan; First Mohmand campaign; Mahsud Waziri blockade
- Awards: Mentioned in despatches (3)

Lieutenant-General Sir Lewis Dening KCB DSO (1848 – 16 February 1911) was a British Indian Army officer. Dening served in the Second Anglo-Afghan War between 1878 and 1879, and fought with the 26th Punjab Infantry in the Third Anglo-Burmese War in 1886. Seeing action in several Burmese skirmishes, he was appointed a Companion of the Distinguished Service Order. Dening took command of the 1st Sikh Infantry in 1892, and then returned to command the 26th Punjabis in 1894. He served in the Anglo-Egyptian conquest of Sudan in 1896, and Mohmand campaign in 1897.

Dening assumed temporary command of the Hyderabad Contingent in 1900, and in the following year was moved to the Derajat District. In this role he participated in the Mahsud Waziri blockade, commanding the first incursion into Mahsud territory in late 1901, and leading columns in two further incursions. He focused on destroying defensive positions and villages, and taking supplies and cattle. Dening was appointed a Companion of the Order of the Bath in 1903, and from 1904 commanded the Jubbulpore Brigade. He was given command of the Burma Division in 1907 and created a Knight Companion of the Order of the Bath in 1909. Ill with coeliac disease and attempting to travel back to Britain, he died in 1911.

== Early life ==
Lewis Dening was born in 1848. His father was John Dening, of Pitt House, Ottery St Mary, in Devon. One of five brothers, his others included Henry, who became a clergyman, and Walter, who lived in Japan. He also had a sister, Selina. As a child Dening was educated locally in Devon.

== Military service ==
=== Early career ===
Dening joined the British Army on 11 May 1867, being commissioned as an ensign in the 75th Regiment of Foot. He transferred to the 39th Regiment of Foot on 11 June the following year.

Dening moved from the British Army to the Bengal Army, later the British Indian Army, on 20 April 1871, joining the Bengal Staff Corps, and was promoted to lieutenant on 1 November. He served in the Second Anglo-Afghan War from 1878 to 1879, and was promoted to captain on 11 May 1879. Later that year he was appointed brigade major at Sialkot, and also served as a magistrate for the cantonment. He continued at Sialkot until 1881. Dening was then appointed as the deputy assistant adjutant general for the Peshawar District in 1884, and in the following year took up the same position in the Presidency District.

Serving in the 26th Punjab Infantry, from 4 March 1886 Dening formed part of the Burma Field Force fighting in the Third Anglo-Burmese War. On 16 April he was given command of a post called Mausi, where during the month there were several skirmishes and four of his sepoys were killed.

By 6 December Dening had been moved to command a post at Shwekee Gee, Upper Burma, with sixty sepoys. On that day the post was attacked by dacoits, with a six hour battle ensuing. Dening had one man killed and another wounded in his successful defence. Having been promoted to major on 11 May 1887, Dening was further rewarded for his services in Burma, being mentioned in despatches and on 1 July created a Companion of the Distinguished Service Order.

=== Regimental command ===
Dening as commanding officer of the 26th Punjab Infantry

Dening took command of the 1st Sikh Infantry, part of the Punjab Frontier Force, in May 1892. He was promoted to lieutenant-colonel on 11 May 1893 and on 10 May 1894 was transferred to the command of the 26th Punjabis, based at Rawalpindi. Dening's regiment was part of the reserve brigade for the Chitral Expedition between April and August 1895, but was never required to cross into hostile territory. On 11 March 1896 the regiment was sent to participate in the Anglo-Egyptian conquest of Sudan, arriving at Suakin on 30 May. From there the unit was assigned as the garrison of Tokar, consolidating the captured territory. They were relieved on 7 November and returned to India on 1 December.

Dening was advanced to the rank of brevet colonel on 11 May 1897. His regiment was then sent to Peshawar on 13 August to participate in the Mohmand campaign in the North-West Frontier. Operating in support of the Mohmand Field Force as it advanced, in September Dening was appointed base commandant of Shabkadar with half of his regiment. He was employed in escorting convoys, garrisoning outposts, and constructing new roads. The Mohmand Field Force returned on 7 October, and Dening's regiment went back to Peshawar. For his services at Shabkadar he was mentioned in despatches.

=== Waziristan campaign ===
Dening left the 26th Punjabis in 1899 to take up work as a staff officer. In 1900 the commander of the Hyderabad Contingent was seconded to serve in the Boxer Rebellion, and Dening was appointed as a brigadier-general to assume temporary command of the unit on 30 July. He was made substantive in his rank as a colonel on 1 September, and in August 1901 was given command of the Derajat District.

The local administration was undertaking the Mahsud Waziri blockade, after the Mahsuds had refused to pay a fine. Dening's command included the outposts hemming the Mahsuds in Waziristan. In the winter of 1901 policy changed to be more retaliatory, and Dening was selected for the first of these operations. He was given command of four columns, totalling 4,600 men, and had a period of four days to advance in Mahsud territory to destroy their defences and food supplies, and take prisoners, before returning.

The first of Dening's columns advancing from Datakhel on 23 November, and destroyed thirteen Mahsud villages, a defensive tower, and much of Makeen. His second column departed a day later from Jandola, and destroyed several small villages and part of Kot Shingi before making a fighting withdrawal in the face of determined Mahsud counter-attacks. Dening's final two columns advanced on 25 November. The first, from Serwekai, destroyed the defences of several villages and captured 500 cattle. The last column, from Wana, destroyed the villages in the Khaisara Valley and captured 124 men. Dening's columns had all returned by 28 November. In total he captured 201 men and 4,000 animals, killing approximately sixty Mahsuds and having five men killed and forty-four wounded in turn.

Map of the North-West Frontier, showing Waziristan and the locations of Jandola and Tank in the south-west

Having returned to headquarters at Tank, Dening proposed a series of follow-up operations, for which he requested and received two extra battalions. Major-General Charles Egerton was then appointed to take command the blockade. Dening's new command comprised seven infantry battalions, as well as small parties of cavalry and artillery. He split it into two columns, and on 4 December advanced from Jandola back north-west towards Kot Shingi, which he finished destroying. On the following day he destroyed several villages; withdrawing, the Mahsuds then began to heavily attack his rearguard and began to flank around his force. Worried that they would intercept a convoy he was expecting from Jandola, Dening retreated back there on 8 December, destroying several more villages along the way.

Dening remained at Jandola until 19 December when he returned to offensive operations, taking 2,300 men in three columns to Ahmadwam, and then joining with a further 1,300 men on 21 December. He used these forces to make attacks around and to the north of Ahmadwam, again focusing on Mahsud villages. His force, now in three columns, attacked up the Mahsud valleys on 22 November, destroying fortified towers and other defensive positions. They returned to Jandola on 24 December. Operations continued after this, with the tactic of incursions by columns continuing to be favoured because it allowed the British to impact the Mahsuds without the expense of occupying their territory. Egerton focused the next operation on the land between Tank and Khaisara, for which Dening was given command of the first of three columns, again starting from Jandola. His approximately 2,500-strong force started out on 1 January 1902, captured some cattle and prisoners, and returned to Jandola on 7 January without coming up against any serious resistance.

Egerton withdrew Dening's column to camp soon afterwards, and on 16 January the Mahsuds began negotiations to end the conflict and pay the outstanding fine. The blockade officially ended on 10 March. For his actions during the campaign Dening was again mentioned in despatches. As part of the 1903 Birthday Honours he was appointed a Companion of the Order of the Bath on 26 June 1903.

=== Senior officer ===
Dening continued at Derajat until he was promoted to major-general on 1 January 1904, and was appointed honorary colonel of the 26th Punjabis on 13 May. In his new rank Dening took command of the Nerbudda District, simultaneously commanding the Jubbulpore Brigade. He was moved to command the Burma Division on 7 February 1907 and was promoted to lieutenant-general on 11 December that year. For the 1909 Birthday Honours, Dening was created a Knight Companion of the Order of the Bath on 25 June.

Having been suffering from coeliac disease, Dening was replaced in command of the Burma Division on 11 February 1911. He began a journey to return to Britain, attended by a medical officer and a nurse. He sailed from Rangoon to Calcutta, where his health somewhat improved, before moving on to Bombay. On 14 February he broke his journey at Jubbulpore, where one of his daughters had a house. He died there in the evening of 16 February.

== Personal life ==
Beatrice, Lady Dening, in 1928

Dening married Eliza Janet Eales in Plymouth in 1872. She died in 1876 and in the following year Dening married Beatrice Catherine Scott. After his death she lived at Hampton Court Palace. Dening had eight children:

- Lewis Eales Dening, British Indian Army lieutenant-colonel
- Harold Dening, British Indian Army lieutenant-colonel
- Roland Dening (born 1888), British Indian Army major-general
- John Pitt Dening (1894–1929), British Indian Army captain and polo player
- Honoria Dening (died 1942), who married Colonel Allan James Macnab, Indian Medical Service
- Irene Dening, who married Major L. Gascoigne, Royal Field Artillery
- Gladys Violet Dening, who married Captain E. W. Anderson, Scottish Rifles
- Eva Joan Dening, who married Major Otho L. Browne
