= Aba Khel =

The Aba Khel are a subtribe of the Mandanr-Yusufzai Pashtun tribe in Swabi District of North West Frontier Province of Pakistan

Aba Khel may also refer to:

- Aba Khel, Waziristan, a town in Waziristan, of Pakistan
- Aba Khel, Tank, a village of Tank District in Khyber Pakhtunkhwa district, Pakistan
- Abba Khel, Lakki Marwat, a village in Lakki Marwat District, Pakistan
