= Mullazai =

Mullazai may refer to:

- Mullazai, Khyber Pakhtunkhwa, a village in Pakistan.
- Mullazai tribe, a Baloch tribe in Balochistan, Pakistan.
- Mulazai tribe, a sub-tribe of the Kakar tribe.

== See also ==
- Mollazehi, a Baloch tribe in Hiduj and Sarbaz County, Iran.
- Mallazai, a village in the Quetta District of Balochistan.
