= General Egerton =

General Egerton may refer to:

- Caledon Egerton (1814–1874), British Army major general
- Charles Egerton (Indian Army officer) (1848–1921), British Indian Army general
- Sir Charles Bulkeley Egerton (1774–1857), British Army general
- David Egerton (British Army officer) (1914–2010), British Army major general
- John Egerton, 7th Earl of Bridgewater (1753–1823), British Army general
