= Aba Khel, Waziristan =

Aba Khel ابا خیل
- Location within Pakistan
- Coordinates: 33.20°N 70.38°E
- Country: Pakistan
- Territory: Federally Administered Tribal Areas
- Elevation: 757 m (2,484 ft)
- Time zone: UTC+5 (PST)
  - Summer (DST): UTC+6 (PDT)

Aba Khel (Urdu: ابا خیل) is a town in the North Waziristan District of Khyber Pakhtunkhwa, Pakistan. It is located at 33°11'47N 70°22'38E with an altitude of 757 metres (2486 feet).

== See also ==
- Adin Shah Kot
- Abak, Khyber Pakhtunkhwa
- Abbas Khel Raghzai
