= Ama Khel =

Coordinates: 32°23′N 70°31′E

- Union Council
- Interactive map of Ama Khel
- Country: Pakistan
- Province: Khyber Pakhtunkhwa
- District: Tank

Population (2017)
  - Total: 14,903
- Time zone: UTC+5 (PST)

Ama Khel is a village in Tank District of Khyber Pakhtunkhwa province of Pakistan. It is one of the 16 union councils in Tank District. Nandoor village is sub village of amakhel. Nandoor village.

== Overview ==
Ama Khel is located in Tank District. Nearby villages are Mullazai, Sherbati, Pai and Gul Imam. Ama Khel also has Government Degree College, which is established in 2011 and regular classes are started in 2013.

Prominent people hailing from Amakhel area are Pir Sabir Shah who became MNA of Dera Ismail Khan after defeating ex-Chief Minister Sardar Inayat Ullah Gandapur in 1985 elections.

According to the 2017 population census, the population of Ama Khel, Tank is 14,903.

== See also ==
- Tank District
