= Sheen Kach Dam =

Dam in Pakistan

- Location within Pakistan
- Country: Pakistan
- Location: FR Tank, FATA
- Coordinates: 32°28′32.3″N 70°19′52.5″E
- Status: Operational
- Construction began: 2012
- Opening date: 2014
- Construction cost: PKR 189 million
- Owner: Government of Pakistan

Dam and spillways
- Type of dam: Earth-filled
- Height: 21 metres (69 ft)
- Length: 200 metres (656 ft)

Reservoir
- Total capacity: 320,000 cubic metres (260 acre⋅ft)
- Catchment area: 31 square kilometres (12 sq mi)

Sheen Kach Dam is small dam in Frontier Region Tank of FATA, Pakistan.

Construction of project started in 2012, and was completed in December 2014 with a projected cost of PKR 189.230 Million. The dam has a height of 21 metres (69 ft) and length of 200 metres (656 ft).

The dam will irrigate 31 square kilometres (12 sq mi) of cultivable lands, with a total storage volume of around 320,000 cubic metres (260 acre⋅ft).

== See also ==
- List of dams and reservoirs in Pakistan
