= Chahikan =

- Village
- Interactive map of Chahikan
- Coordinates: 31°54′49″N 70°44′48″E
- Country: Pakistan
- Province: Khyber Pakhtunkhwa
- District: Dera Ismail Khan District

Chahikan, also known as Chahkan, is a village of Dera Ismail Khan District in the Khyber Pakhtunkhwa province of Pakistan. It is located at 31°54'49N 70°44'48E at an altitude of 252 metres, and is a situated on the Dera Ismail Khan to Tank road. It is the headquarters of the Union Council of Chahkan.

== History ==
This village was first developed by Sahi caste in later 15th century. The sahis came from Afghanistan and started to live near Gomal Kalan. After some time they killed a person in Gomal Kalan and the Govt. of that time decided to settle them in the place now called Chahkan to prevent the clash between two tribes. Chahkan is the combination of two Persian words Chah meaning water and kan meaning well. The area where Chahkan village is situated was abundant in water and the people dig wells for water. Hence the place is now called chahkan. The native language of the people of chahkan is Saraeki and chahkan is also known as KHOEYAN which mean chahkan. The Kochi pawandgans caste renamed this village as Mochiyan due to the Mochi caste which mend shoes because mochi caste is also present in this village. The most popular things of chahkan are shoes prepared in this village and the vessels made of mud used to store water in summer. Malik Ghulam Akbar Sahi (Late) Malik Doctor Abdul Latif Sahi Ch. Fazal Ahmad Sahi (Late) Malik Safeer Fazal Sahi famous family of sahi caste. Mushtaq Raza Sahi a famous poet of sraeki also belonged to this village.
