= Aba Khel, Tank =

Aba Khel
- Location within Pakistan
- Coordinates: 32.14°N 70.22°E
- Country: Pakistan
- Province: Khyber Pakhtunkhwa
- District: Tank
- Elevation: 265 m (869 ft)
- Time zone: UTC+5 (PST)

Aba Khel is a village of Tank District in the Khyber Pakhtunkhwa of Pakistan. It is located at 32°14'41"N 70°22'58"E with an altitude of 265 metres (869 feet) and lies to the north-east of the capital Tank. It is situated very close to the Tank City and is primarily compose of Kati Khel Tribe. The area is under the influence of Nawab Saadat of Tank.
