= Khwajikhel =

KhwjiKhel
- Sub-tribe of Mullazai
- Country: Pakistan
- Province: North-West Frontier Province
- Elevation: 165 m (541 ft)
- Time zone: UTC+5 (PST)

Khwaji Khel is a tribe or clan in jurisdiction of Tank District.

== Origin ==
Khwaji Khel is a sub-tribe of Malay zai or Mali zai, better known as the Mullazai tribe.

== History ==
Khwaji Khels are the descendants of Malay zai probably known as Mullazai.
