= Warspoon =

- Union Council
- Country: Pakistan
- Province: Khyber Pakhtunkhwa
- District: Tank
- Time zone: UTC+5 (PST)
- Number of towns: ADD HERE
- Number of Union Councils: ADD HERE

Warspoon is an administrative unit, known as Union council, of Tank District in the Khyber Pakhtunkhwa province of Pakistan.

District Tank has 1 Tehsils i.e. Tank. Each tehsil comprises certain numbers of union councils. There are 16 union councils in district Tank.

== See also ==
- Tank District
