= Sarangzuna =

- Union Council
- Country: Pakistan
- Province: Khyber Pakhtunkhwa
- District: Tank
- Time zone: UTC+5 (PST)
- Number of towns: ADD HERE
- Number of Union Councils: ADD HERE

Sarangzuna is an administrative unit, known as Union council, of Tank District in the Khyber Pakhtunkhwa province of Pakistan. There are two rivers that run through Gomal Valley, Gomal River on the south and Narsis River on the north.

District Tank has 1 Tehsil, Tank and 16 union councils.

== See also ==
- Tank District
