= Gul Imam =

Coordinates: 32°16′N 70°32′E

- Union Council
- Interactive map of Gul Imam
- Country: Pakistan
- Province: Khyber Pakhtunkhwa
- District: Tank
- Time zone: UTC+5 (PST)
- Number of towns: ADD HERE
- Number of Union Councils: ADD HERE

Gul Imam is a village in Tank District of Khyber Pakhtunkhwa province in Pakistan. It is located around 15 km from Tank town in Tank district.

== Overview ==
Gul Imam is one of 16 Union council in the Tank District of Khyber Pakhtunkhwa in Pakistan. Nearbly villages are Abizar, Sherbati, Pai and Ama Khel.

== See also ==
- Ama Khel
- Tank District
