= George Egerton (Royal Navy officer) =

Royal Navy Admiral (1852–1940)

Admiral Sir George Egerton KCB
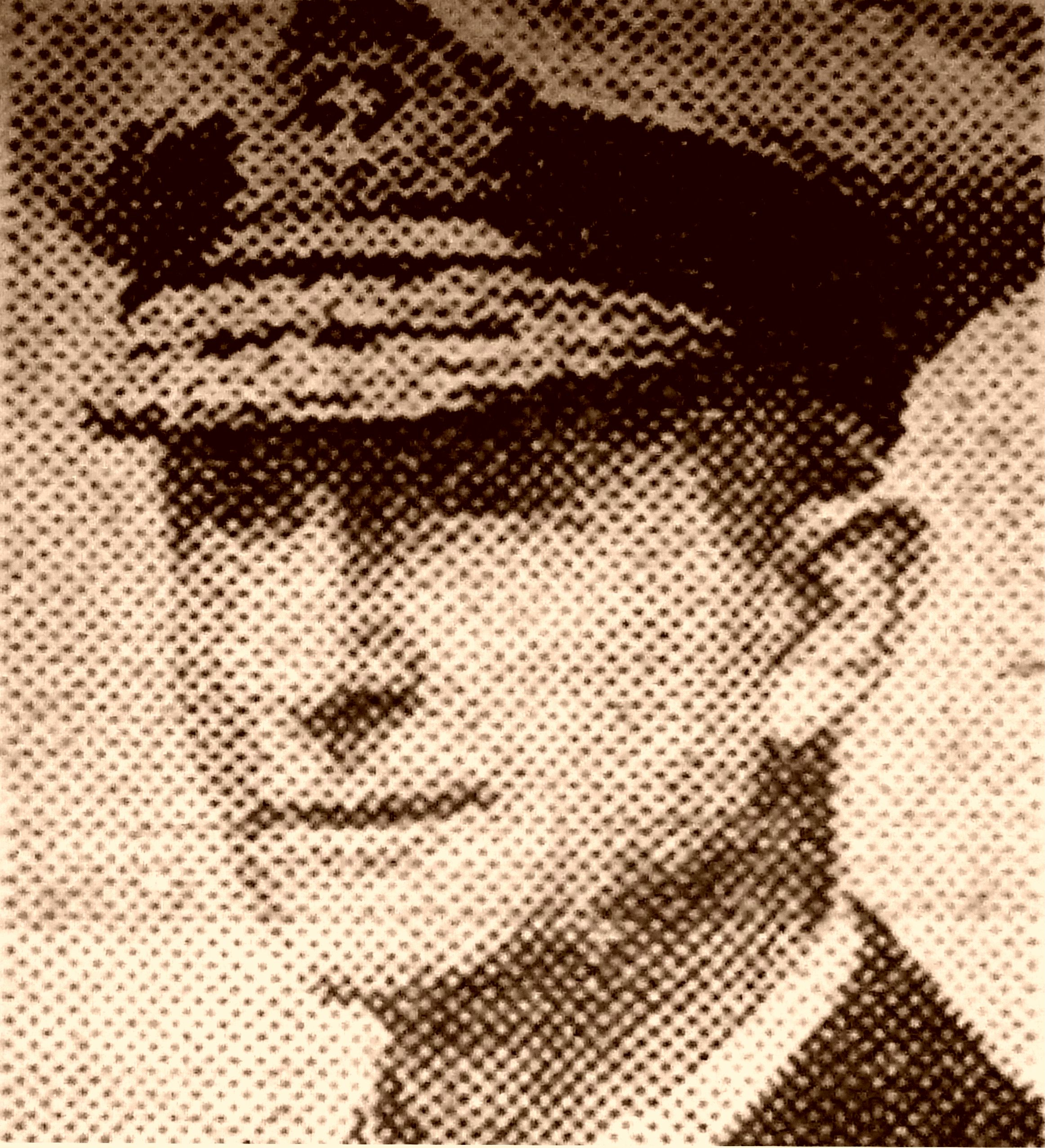
- Egerton in 1916
- Born: 17 October 1852
- Died: 30 March 1940 (aged 87)
- Relatives: Major General Caledon Egerton (father); Field Marshal Sir Charles Egerton (brother); Sir Brian Egerton (brother)
- Military career
- Allegiance: United Kingdom
- Branch: Royal Navy
- Service years: 1866–1916
- Rank: Admiral
- Commands: Plymouth Command (1913–16); Cape of Good Hope Station (1908–10); HMS Majestic (1900–01)
- Conflicts: Benin Expedition of 1897; First World War
- Awards: Knight Commander of the Order of the Bath; Mentioned in Despatches

Admiral Sir George Le Clerc Egerton, KCB (17 October 1852 – 30 March 1940) was a senior Royal Navy officer from the Egerton family who rose to become Second Sea Lord in 1911.

== Naval career ==
Egerton joined the Royal Navy in 1866. He served on the Arctic Expedition of 1875–76. In 1893 he was promoted to captain and appointed a naval attaché before serving with the Naval Brigade in Mombasa in 1895, and he was chief of staff for the Benin Expedition of 1897.

By early 1900 Egerton was in command of the pre-dreadnought battleship HMS Majestic, serving as flagship to Vice-Admiral Sir Harry Rawson, commander-in-chief of the Channel Fleet. In June 1901 he was transferred to HMS President for service as assistant director of torpedoes at the Admiralty, a position he left the following February when he transferred to the torpedo school ship HMS Vernon.

Egerton was appointed second-in-command of the Atlantic Fleet in 1906: he flew his flag on HMS Victorious, with Captain Robert Scott as his flag captain. He became commander-in-chief, Cape of Good Hope Station in 1908 and Second Sea Lord in 1911. He served in the First World War as Commander-in-Chief, Plymouth. He had previously served as aide-de-camp to King Edward VII, and retired in 1916.

== Family ==
A grandson of The Rev Sir Philip Grey-Egerton, 9th Bt, his six brothers included Field Marshal Sir Charles Egerton of the Indian Army and Sir Brian Egerton.

He married, first, in 1882, Frances Emily Gladstone; they had two sons and a daughter, including Rear-Admiral Brian Egerton (1886–1973). He married, second, Margaret Stella Maunsell, in 1932.

Military offices
Preceded by Sir Edmund Poë	Commander-in-Chief, Cape of Good Hope Station; 1908–1910	Succeeded by Paul Bush
Preceded by Sir Francis Bridgeman	Second Sea Lord; 1911	Succeeded by Prince Louis of Battenberg
Preceded by Sir William May	Commander-in-Chief, Plymouth; 1913–1916	Succeeded by Sir George Warrender, Bt.
