= Mallazai =

- Village
- Malazai
- Location within Pakistan
- Coordinates: 30.60833°N 67.49417°E
- Country: Pakistan
- Province: Balochistan
- District: Panjgur
- Elevation: 2,398 m (7,867 ft)
- Time zone: UTC+5 (PST)

Mallazai or Malazai is a settlement in the Quetta District of the province of Balochistan, Pakistan. It is situated close to the N-25 National Highway between the city of Quetta and Kuchlak.

== See also ==
- Quetta
- Malazai (disambiguation)
