= John Pitt Dening =

British Indian Army officer and polo player

Captain John Pitt Dening (1894 - 1929) was a soldier and British India champion polo player.

== Early life ==
Dening was born 21 November 1894 to Lieutenant-General Sir Lewis Dening and Lady Dening of Hampton Court Palace at Jhelum, Punjab, India. He was educated at Wellington College.

== Military career ==
He attended the Royal Military College, Sandhurst and was commissioned a Second Lieutenant onto the Unattached List for the Indian Army 14 January 1914. He was accepted for the Indian Army and joined the 21st Prince Albert Victor's Own Cavalry on the 10 October 1914. He was promoted Lieutenant 14 April 1916, later antedated to 1 September 1915.

He served in Mesopotamia from 12 September 1916 to 31 October 1918 and was Mentioned in Dispatches. He was promoted Captain 14 January 1918.

In 1919-20 he attended the Cavalry School at Saugor From late 1921 to late 1922 he was the Adjutant of his regiment, which had amalgamated with the 23rd Cavalry in 1921 to form the 11th Prince Albert Victor's Own Cavalry.

He participated in the 1927 International Polo Cup.

From mid 1928 till early 1929 he was the commandant of Bhopal Sultania Infantry, an Indian States Forces unit.

== Death ==
Whilst on leave in England, Dening shot himself in a locked apartment at the Bolton House Hotel, Bolton Street, Westminster, on the 9 April 1929.
