= Brian Egerton =

British policeman soldier and tutor in India

Sir Brian Egerton KCIE (27 November 1857–12 June 1940) was a British policeman and soldier in British India and the tutor and civil servant of Indian princes.

Born in Ireland in 1857, Egerton was the youngest of the seven sons of Major General Caledon Egerton, who died in 1874, and his wife Margaret Cumming. His grandfather was the Rev. Philip Grey-Egerton (1767–1829), a Cheshire clergyman who in his final years succeeded to the Grey-Egerton baronetcy. His brothers went on to have distinguished careers and included Field Marshal Sir Charles Egerton of the Indian Army and Admiral Sir George Egerton of the Royal Navy. Lieutenant-General Richard Egerton (1783–1854) was one of the brothers of his grandfather.

Egerton was educated at Cheltenham College and entered the Punjab Police in 1879. In 1880 he saw action in the Second Anglo-Afghan War, receiving the campaign medal. In 1884, he was promoted to Assistant District Superintendent of Police, Punjab, and was later District Superintendent of Police in Ajmer, where he wrote the report on the census of 1891.

In 1892, Egerton was posted as Boundary Settlement Officer in Udaipur. In 1894, Colonel Trevor, agent to the Governor-General in the Rajputana Agency, recommended that he had the qualities to be a young prince's guardian, and he was then chosen by Lord Elgin, the Viceroy of India, as the guardian and tutor of Ganga Singh, a boy who was already Maharajah of Bikaner, with the aim of furthering the British interest in Bikaner. On his arrival, in the hot season, he found Ganga Singh living in a palace without electric fans in temperatures above 110 degrees Fahrenheit, but insisted that his place was with his ward. He remained in that post until 1899. At the beginning of 1899, Mahboob Ali Khan appointed Egerton on probation for two years as tutor to his son Prince Osman Ali Khan, the future Nizam of Hyderabad. Egerton was still serving in Hyderabad in 1910, and in 1911 Osman Ali Khan succeeded as Nizam. In 1920, Egerton was noted to be the Nizam's Controller-General of Paigahs. In February 1921, he attended the funeral of his brother Field Marshal Sir Charles Egerton at Highcliffe in England. In October of that year, he was living at Mudeford. In December 1930, he had a visit in Hampshire from the Maharajah of Bikaner. In October 1937, aged nearly eighty, Egerton travelled to Bikaner to attend the celebration of the ruler's Jubilee.

Egerton ended his life in retirement at Winkton House, near Christchurch, England, and died there in June 1940. His funeral was at the parish church of Burton, Dorset, on 14 June.

== Honours ==
In 1906, Egerton was appointed as a Companion of the Order of the Indian Empire, and in 1914 was promoted to a Knight Commander of the Order.
