= Kot Allah Dad =

Coordinates: 32°07′33.03″N 70°27′22.29″E

Kot Allah Dad is a small village in Tank District of Khyber Pakhtunkhwa, located about two miles West of Tank-Dera Ismail Khan road and about 50 Kilometers from the border of South Waziristan. An archaeological site of an ancient civilization exists nearby.
