= Mahsud Waziri blockade =

- Part of Instability on the North-West Frontier
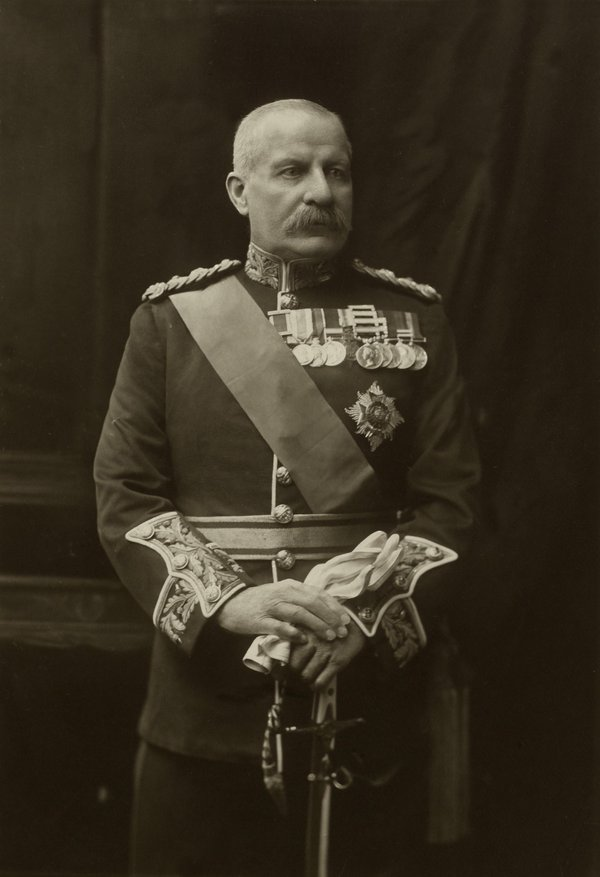
- Charles Egerton, commander of the British forces
Date	1 December 1900 – 10 March 1902 (1 year, 3 months, 1 week and 2 days)
Location	British India
Result	British victory

Belligerents
British India	Mahsud rebels

Commanders and leaders
Charles Egerton; Lewis Dening	unknown

Units involved
13 infantry battalions; 1st Sikh Infantry; 3rd Sikh Infantry; 4th Sikh Infantry; 2nd Punjab Infantry; 4th Punjab Infantry; 5th Punjab Infantry; 22nd Punjab Infantry; 1st Punjab Cavalry; 3rd Punjab Cavalry; 5th Punjab Cavalry; Sappers and Miners; 1 mountain battery; 2 pioneer battalions; North Waziristan militia; South Waziristan militia	unknown

Casualties and losses
32 killed, 114 wounded	126 killed, 250 wounded

The Mahsud Waziri blockade was a campaign against the Mahsud in British India. It began with a passive blockade on 1 December 1900. The British forces were commanded by Major General Charles Egerton. The "most intense" period of fighting began on 23 November 1901. Mobile columns concentrated at Datta Khel, Jandola, Sarwakai and Wana raided Mahsud territory every several weeks, seizing livestock, taking Mahsud members captive and inflicting heavy casualties. The Mahsud finally surrendered on 10 March 1902.
