= Tochi Expedition =

Anglo-Pashtun conflict

The Tochi Expedition was a punitive visit by Anglo-Indian troops to the Tochi Valley, Waziristan in 1897 to put down a rebellion there.

The rebellion started with an attack by the Madda Khel section of the Waziris in June 1897.

The Tochi Valley Field Force assembled in response was commanded by General Corrie Bird and included the 1st Brigade under the command of Brigadier-General Charles Egerton. The rebellion was finally put down in October 1897.

== Resources ==
- G.V. Kemball, Operations of the Tochi Field Force in 1897–98. Simla, Govt. Central Printing Office (1900).
