= Nizam's Contingent =

- Active: 1798 – 27 October 1945
- Allegiance: Hyderabad State (1798–1853); East India Company (1853–1858); British India (1858–1945)
- Branch: Hyderabad State Forces; Madras Army; British Indian Army
- Type: Cavalry
- Size: Regiment

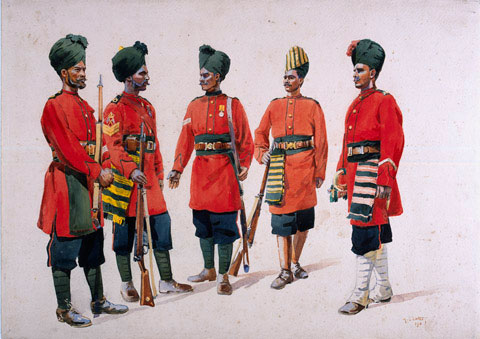
Infantry of the Nizam's Contingent, 1910

The Nizam's Contingent, later Hyderabad Contingent, was a British-officered army of the Nizam of Hyderabad.

== History ==
The Nizam's Contingent was formed through the plan of Governor-General Richard Wellesley, 1st Marquess Wellesley to rid British India of French influence. On arriving in India in 1798, he effected the disbandment of the Nizam of Hyderabad's Indian units that had been under the command of the Frenchman Monsieur Raymond and officered by non-British Europeans.

The disbanded units would be formed into a British-officered army and would fight with the East India Company troops during the Mysore campaign (1790 - 1792) and their efforts at the Siege of Seringapatam against Tipu Sultan in the final battle of the Fourth Anglo-Mysore War would earn approbation of the Arthur Wellesley, 1st Duke of Wellington, who recorded that they 'behaved well.'

The Madras Presidency would have no cause to raise Irregular troops as the services of the Nizam's forces could be relied upon for support.

== Russell Brigade ==
In 1813, Sir Henry Russell, 2nd Baronet, the British Resident to the court of the Nizam of Hyderabad, raised the Russell Brigade, comprising two battalions. Later, four more battalions were raised and they were known as the Berar Infantry. In addition, two battalions, known as the Elichpur Brigade, were raised by Nawab Salabat Khan, Subedar of Berar, who later formed part of the Nizam's forces. The men of the Russell Brigade were chiefly Hindus, recruited from Oudh and other parts of Uttar Pradesh.

== Hyderabad Contingent ==
By 1853, at the time of the signing of a treaty between the Nizam and the British, the Nizam's forces consisted of eight battalions. The East India Company assumed the responsibility for maintaining the Nizam's Contingent, renaming it the Hyderabad Contingent in exchange for rights to administer the Berar Division. The Hyderabad Contingent would serve closely alongside the Madras Army of the East India Company.

=== Indian Rebellion of 1857 ===
The Hyderabad Contingent would remain loyal to Company rule in India during the Indian Rebellion of 1857, effectively stemming the revolt in the Carnatic and Mysore regions.

== British Raj ==
During the British Raj, the unit would see serve in Burma (1885-1887), on the North-West Frontier (1897) and in the Boxer Rebellion (1900). In 1902, seven regiments would be transferred to the British Indian Army.

=== World War I ===
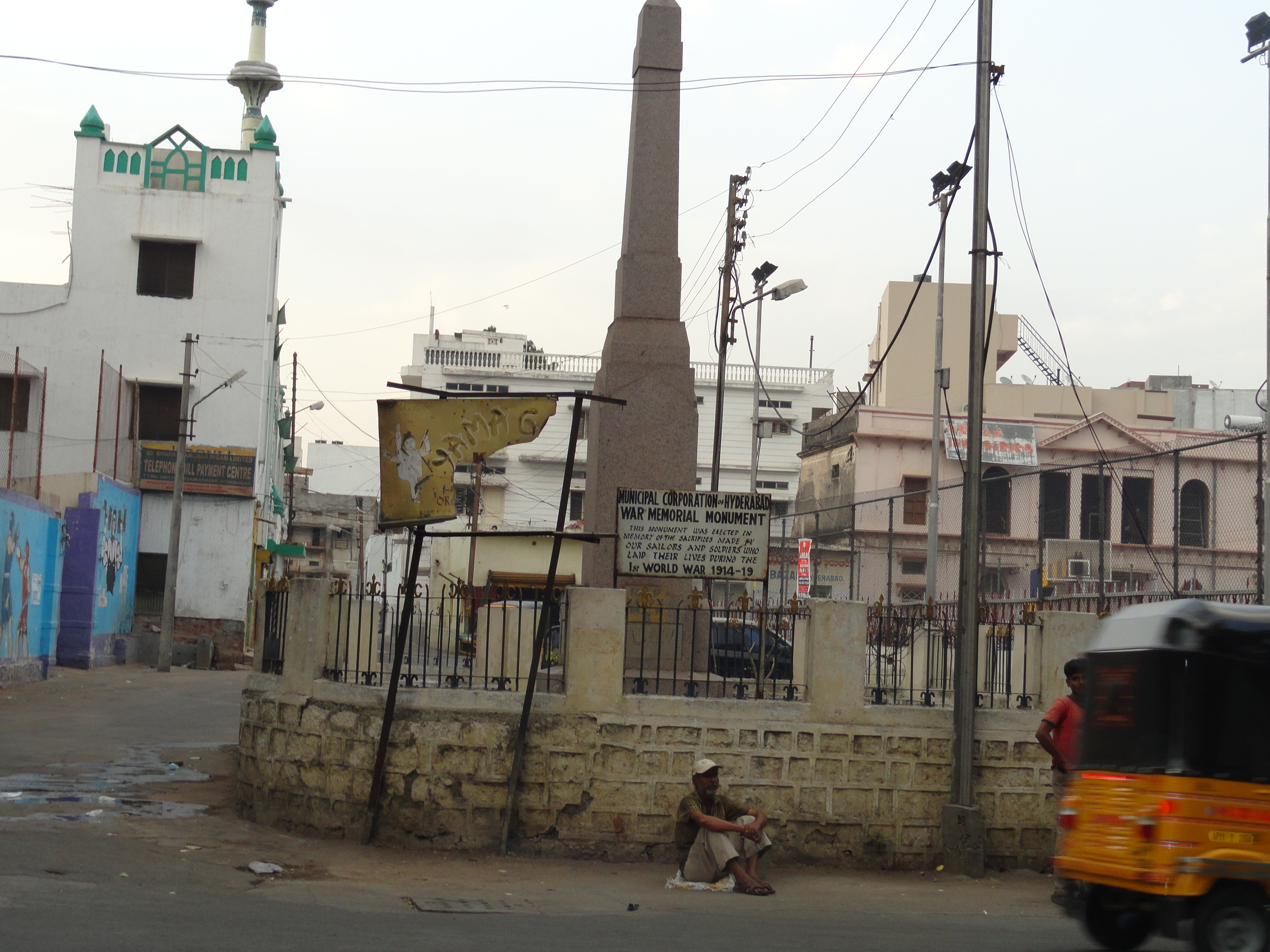
Monument to soldiers from Hyderabad who fought in World War 1 at Chaderghat

On 23 October 1917, during the World War I, a Kumaon Battalion was raised at Ranikhet as the "4/39th Kumaon Rifles". In 1918, this unit was redesignated as the 1st battalion, 50th Kumaon Rifles, and a second battalion was raised. These were merged with the Hyderabad Contingent into the 19th Hyderabad Regiment in 1922. Some units of the regiment were demobilized after the war, but the regiment would be again expanded during the World War II.

== Kumaon Regiment ==
As links with Hyderabad and Deccan lessened, calls to rename the regiment were heard. On 27 October 1945, the 19th Hyderabad Regiment was renamed the 19th Kumaon Regiment and renamed again as the Kumaon Regiment after the independence of India.

== General Officers Commanding ==
The General Officers Commanding, Hyderabad Contingent, have included:

Rank	Name	Date	Notes
Brigadier	William Mayne	1 January 1854	Commanding Northern Division
Brigadier	Colin Mackenzie	1 January 1854	Commanding Southern Division
Brevet Major	W. A. Orr	23 January 1855	Temporary - Northern Division
Brigadier	William Hill	4 May 1856	Divisions merged into one command
Brigadier-General	Harry Lumsden	4 March 1862	
Brigadier-General	Henry Abbott	16 December 1868	
Brigadier-General	Thomas Wright	10 December 1874	
Brigadier-General	Charles Gough	29 April 1881	
Brigadier-General	John McQueen	16 September 1885	Commanding Punjab Frontier Force
Brigadier-General	T. H. Way	10 June 1886	Officiating
Colonel	W. J. Bell	29 August 1886	Officiating
Brigadier-General	Richard Stewart	15 October 1886	
Brigadier-General	Montague Protheroe	9 April 1890	Officiating - confirmed 26 October 1890
Lieutenant-Colonel	James Cummins	November 1892	Temporary
Brigadier-General	Montague Protheroe	April 1893	
Lieutenant-Colonel	James Kirkwood	20 June 1895	Officiating
Lieutenant-Colonel	Robert Gilchrist	10 November 1895	Officiating
Major-General	Sir Montagu Gerard	1 April 1896	
Major-General	Sir Norman Stewart	27 April 1899	Relief of Peking, 1900
Brigadier-General	Lewis Dening	30 July 1900	Temporary
Major-General	Sir Norman Stewart	1901	
Brigadier-General	George Richardson	29 May 1902	Officiating - confirmed 1 July 1902

== See also ==
- Hyderabad State Forces
- Hyderabadi battalion
