= Mullazai, Khyber Pakhtunkhwa =

ملازئی Mulazai
- Village
- Location within Pakistan
- Coordinates: 32.413489°N 70.465826°E
- Country: Pakistan
- Province: Khyber-Pakhtunkhwa
- Elevation: 165 m (541 ft)
- Time zone: UTC+5 (PST)
- Number of Union councils: 1

Mullazai (Urdu: ملازئی) is a Pashtun village in Pakistan situated in southern part of Khyber Pakhtunkhwa near Tank District.

Mullazai, also known as Malazai or Malay zai or Mali Zai, is a Pashtun Marwat village.

== Geography ==
Mullazai lies at an altitude of 255 m (839 ft) and is situated to the north-west of the Indus River and close to the District of Tank. At a distance of 200 miles from Peshawar and about 40 miles from the city of Tank, Pakistan, which is the capital for the region. Mullazai is hot and humid in summers, when the temperature in Mullazai can reach 110-120 °F.

== Origin ==
Tribe Family Tree Malay zai / Malay zee
- Village
- Mulazai ملازئی
- Website: http://www.khyber.org/pashtotribes/trees/marwat.shtml

It has a population of around more than 80,000, the second biggest in Tank district. The people of Mullazai are known as Marwats. Mala Zai (or Mali Zai) was the second son of Nona, who was the third son of Marwat

Clans of the village include Sain khel, Khwaji Khel, Nazar Khel and Haji Khel. Other clans like Salmanzai and Jang-e-khel claim to be Marwats but are disputed by historians. Most of them are ethnic minorities migrated and settled in Mullazai in later times. Some of the most notable people from the village include the late Lt Col. Sarfaraz Khan, probably the most important, who was awarded the title of Ghaz-e-Kashmir and was nominated to be a member of the Federal Council Majlis-Shoora in 1980 by General Muhammad Zia-ul-Haq.

== Economy ==
The economy of the village mainly depends on farming and engineering. Also, many of the village's inhabitants work in the local schools and hospitals.

Agriculture is dependent on the significant local rainfall and from tube wells. Many people from this village also work as contractors in Oman and the United Arab Emirates.

== Education ==
There are institutions that range from primary to high school level.

There are two high Schools, one for boys and one for girls. There are also English language schools in the area. Every year those students who pass their examinations and continue on to higher education have to do so outside the Tank District. A late landlord Col Sarfaraz Khan hoped to promote education in the area and donated property for the use of a high school for girls and for a separate primary school.

== People ==
Family administration in the area is headed by the father or elder of the family.

The game of Maila is popular in the area. The game consists of three people from one village attempting to topple three people from another village, whilst all standing on one leg. Celebrations ensue when the game is over, by the winning villagers lighting fires and dancing until late in the night.

The local Jirga make the local religious decisions and maintain the customs of the area based on their set of laws and principles.

If any of the villagers die, not only do the relatives, but all the adult villagers, both men and women, go to the bereaved family. There, they will spend the whole night reciting the Quran for the affected family. To console the bereaved family after the dead are buried, they stay with them for three consecutive nights and render as much help as they can to the bereaved family and pray for the deceased person.
