= Caledon Egerton =

British Army general

Major-General Caledon Egerton
- Born: 28 July 1814
- Died: 27 May 1874 (aged 59)
- Relatives: Grey-Egerton baronets
- Military career
- Allegiance: United Kingdom
- Branch: British Army
- Rank: Major-General
- Unit: 89th Regiment of Foot
- Conflicts: Crimean War
- Awards: Order of the Medjidie, Fifth Class (Ottoman Empire)

Major-General Caledon Richard Egerton (28 July 1814 – 27 May 1874) was a senior British Army officer from the Egerton family who served as Military Secretary.

== Military career ==
Egerton was commissioned into the 89th Regiment of Foot. He was appointed adjutant of his regiment in 1836, served in the Crimean War and was decorated with the Order of the Medjidie, Fifth Class. He features in a photograph taken in the Crimea by Roger Fenton.

Appointed Deputy Adjutant-General in 1866 and Military Secretary in 1871, Egerton was also Colonel of the 89th Regiment of Foot.

== Family ==
In 1843 Egerton married Margaret Cumming, and they went on to have seven sons and two daughters. Four of their sons were knighted, including Field Marshal Sir Charles Egerton, Sir Reginald Egerton (private secretary to the Postmaster-General), Admiral Sir George Egerton, and Sir Brian Egerton (tutor to Ganga Singh, Maharaja of Bikaner).

Military offices
Preceded by William Forster	Military Secretary; 1871–1874	Succeeded by Sir Alfred Horsford
