= Kakka Khel =

Town in North-West Frontier Province, Pakistan

Coordinates: 32°25′10″N 70°28′16″E

Kakki Khel is a town in the North-West Frontier Province of Pakistan. It is located at 32°25'10N 70°28'16E and has an altitude of 277 metres (912 feet).
