= Mullazai tribe =

Baloch Tribe

Mullazai
Languages
- Balochi

Religion
- Islam

Related ethnic groups
- Baloch people

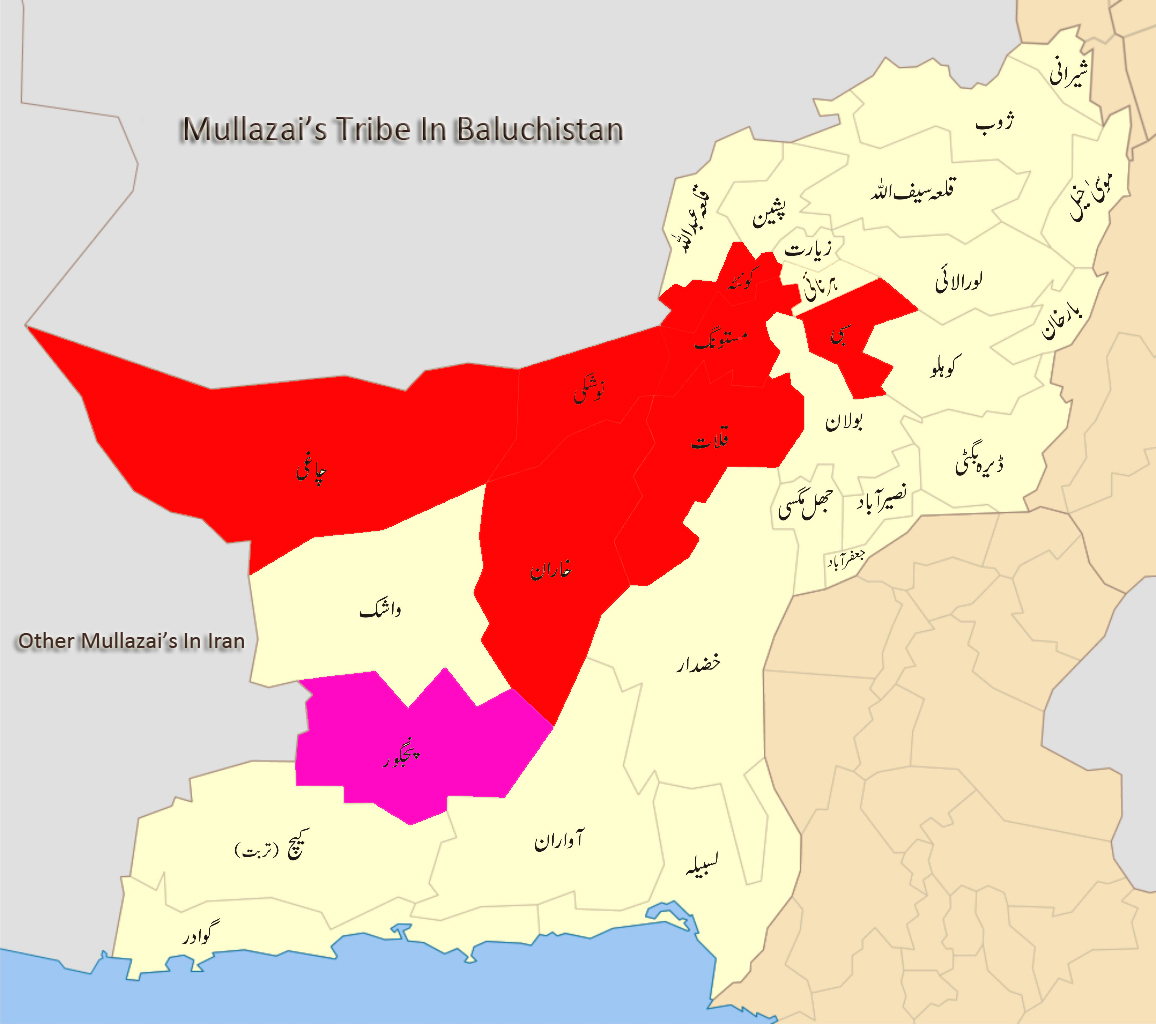
Presence of the Mullazai tribe in Baluchistan

Mullazai, also spelt Mollazehi, (Balochi: ملازئی) is a subtribe of the Rind Baloch tribe.

== Geography ==
They are found in Panjgur District (پنجگور) of Balochistan, Pakistan and Tank District of Khyber Pakhtunkhwa, Pakistan. A number of Mullazais live in the Balochistan province of Iran, Saravan, Iranshahr, Khash and other parts of Balochistan.

== History ==
The Mullazai tribe is one of the oldest tribes of the Baloch.Their presence in Makran dates back centuries. The tribe originates from East Balochistan, the same place where the Baloch king Mir Chakar Khan Rind comes from.

The Mullazai tribe participated in the war against the Sikhs and inflicted heavy casualties on them.

== Notable people ==
One of the most influential people from the Mullazai tribe who contributed to Balochi literature was Natiq Makrani, a Baloch writer, mystic, and poet of the 13th century who wrote poetry in Balochi and Persian.

Pir Mohammad Mollazehi (born in 1946 in Saravan, died on June 26, 1404) was a prominent expert in the political and geopolitical issues, the Middle East, Iran, Afghanistan and Pakistan.

Hamid al-Din Mollazehi is a politician born in 1955 from Iranshahr and a two-term representative of Islamic Consultative Assembly In Iran.

== See also ==
- List of Baloch tribes
