= Adin Shah Kot =

Adin Shah Kot ادیں شاہ کوٹ
- Location within Pakistan
- Coordinates: 32.98°N 70.19°E
- Country: Pakistan
- Territory: Federally Administered Tribal Areas
- Elevation: 718 m (2,356 ft)
- Time zone: UTC+5 (PST)
  - Summer (DST): UTC+6 (PDT)

Adin Shah Kot (Urdu: ادیں شاہ کوٹ) is a town in the Federally Administered Tribal Areas of Pakistan. It is located at 32°59'1N 70°11'24E with an altitude of 718 metres (2358 feet).
