= Abba Khel, Lakki Marwat =

Coordinates: 32°26′49″N 70°58′6″E

Abba Khel
- Town and union council
- Interactive map of Abba Khel
- Country: Pakistan
- Region: Khyber Pakhtunkhwa
- District: Lakki Marwat District
- Time zone: UTC+5 (PST)

Abba Khel is a town and Union Council of Lakki Marwat District in Khyber Pakhtunkhwa. It was formerly a Union Council of neighbouring Dera Ismail Khan District. As of 2017 it has a population of 22,092 of which 10,942 are male and 11,150 female, literacy of those aged ten and above was 80.51% for males and 29.19% for females.
