= Abbas Khel Raghzai =

Abbas Khel Raghzai عباس خیل رغزئی
- Location within Pakistan
- Coordinates: 32.37°N 69.79°E
- Country: Pakistan
- Territory: Federally Administered Tribal Areas
- Elevation: 1,433 m (4,701 ft)
- Time zone: UTC+5 (PST)
  - Summer (DST): UTC+6 (PDT)

Abbas Khel Raghzai (Urdu: عباس خیل رغزئی) is a town in the Khyber Pakhtunkhwa of Pakistan. It is located at 32°22'6N 69°47'14E with an altitude of 1433 metres (4704 feet).
