= Abak, Khyber Pakhtunkhwa =

Abak ابک
- Location within Pakistan
- Coordinates: 32.57°N 69.84°E
- Country: Pakistan
- Territory: Federally Administered Tribal Areas
- Elevation: 1,702 m (5,584 ft)
- Time zone: UTC+5 (PST)
  - Summer (DST): UTC+6 (PDT)

Abak (Urdu: ابک) is a town in the Federally Administered Tribal Areas of Pakistan. It is located at 32°34'9N 69°50'28E with an altitude of 1702 metres (5587 feet).
