= Ahmadwam =

- Location within Pakistan
- Coordinates: 32.54°N 70.01°E
- Country: Pakistan
- Territory: Federally Administered Tribal Areas
- Elevation: 1,270 m (4,170 ft)
- Time zone: UTC+5 (PST)
  - Summer (DST): UTC+6 (PDT)

Ahmadwam is a town in the Federally Administered Tribal Areas of Pakistan. It is located at 32°32'21N 70°0'24E at an altitude of 1270 metres (4169 feet).
