= Jandola Tehsil =

Coordinates: 32.4°N 70.36°E

Jandola Tehsil تحصیل جنڈولہ جنډوله تحصیل Frontier Region Tank سرحدی علاقہ ٹانک ټانک سرحدي سیمه
- Tehsil
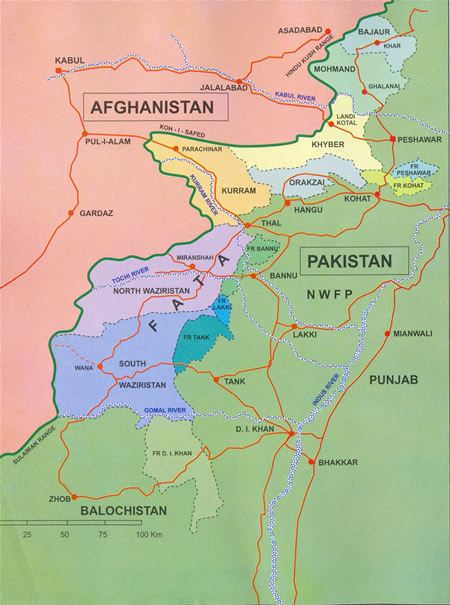
- Location of the former Frontier Regions in the former Federally Administered Tribal Areas
- Country: Pakistan
- Region: Khyber Pakhtunkhwa
- District: Tank District
- Headquarters: Jandola

Population (2017)
  - Total: 36,389

Jandola Tehsil is an administrative subdivision (tehsil) of Tank District in Khyber Pakhtunkhwa province of Pakistan. The subdivision borders South Waziristan to the north, south and west and Lakki Marwat District to the north-east.

The capital is the town of Jandola.

Prior to 2018, this administrative subdivision was known as Tank Subdivision, and formerly also known as Frontier Region Tank. The region was named after Tank District which lied to the south-east. With the dissolution of the Federally Administered Tribal Areas and its incorporation into Khyber Pakhtunkhwa, Frontier Region Tank was reorganizd as Jandola Tehsil within Tank District.

== Geography and climate ==
The region is mostly covered by the dry Bhittani hills, gradually sloping from north-west towards south-east. The highest point of the region is 1,943 m (6,375 ft) above sea level. Most of the streams which originate from the region are seasonal and normally end up in the arid plains of Dera Ismail Khan District.

The region experiences hot summers and cold winters. The summer season is from April to October with June, July and August as the hottest months. The winter season is from November to March with December, January and February as the coldest months.

== Demography ==
The 1998 census counted a total population of 27,200. Pashto is the first language of 97.5% of the population, and Punjabi – of 2.1%. The main tribe in the region is the Bhittani, who also inhabit the frontier regions of Dera Ismail Khan and Bannu.

== Notable people ==
- Abdullah Nagyal
- Pattu Lala
- Sardar Rahim
- Said Badshah Ahqar
- Mir Sallam Aqdas

== See also ==
- Federally Administered Tribal Areas
- Tank District
