= Tank (city) =

Pakistani town

Tank: ټانک / ټاک; ٹانک; ٹاک
- Location within Khyber Pakhtunkhwa Location within Pakistan
- Coordinates: 32.13°N 70.23°E
- Country: Pakistan
- Province: Khyber Pakhtunkhwa
- District: Tank District

Area
  - Total: 1,679 km^{2} (648 sq mi)
- Elevation: 261 m (856 ft)

Population (2023 census)
  - Total: 49,172
- Time zone: UTC+5 (PST)
- Number of towns: 1
- Number of Union Councils: 16

Tank (Pashto: ټانک / ټاک; Urdu: ٹانک; Saraiki: ٹاک) is the capital city of Tank District, Khyber Pakhtunkhwa, Pakistan. The city is located northwest of Dera Ismail Khan, and southeast of Jandola, Tank Subdivision (formerly known as "Frontier Region Tank"). Lakki Marwat and Bannu lies to the northeast while South Waziristan lies to the west.

== Climate ==
The climate in Tank is referred to as a local steppe climate. There is little rainfall throughout the year. This location is classified as BSh by Köppen and Geiger. The average annual temperature in Tank is 24.1 °C. The annual rainfall is 539 mm. The temperatures are highest on average in June, at around 34.5 °C. The lowest average temperatures in the year occur in January, when it is around 11.9 °C.

== Demographics ==
=== Population ===
Historical population
Year	Pop.	±% p.a.
1951	6,894	—
1961	10,582	+4.38%
1972	14,306	+2.78%
1981	25,003	+6.40%
1998	35,741	+2.12%
2017	47,064	+1.46%
2023	49,172	+0.73%

As of the 2023 census, Haripur had a population of 91,915.

The population of city in 1972 was 14,306 but according to the 2023 Census of Pakistan, the population has risen to 49,172.

== Location ==
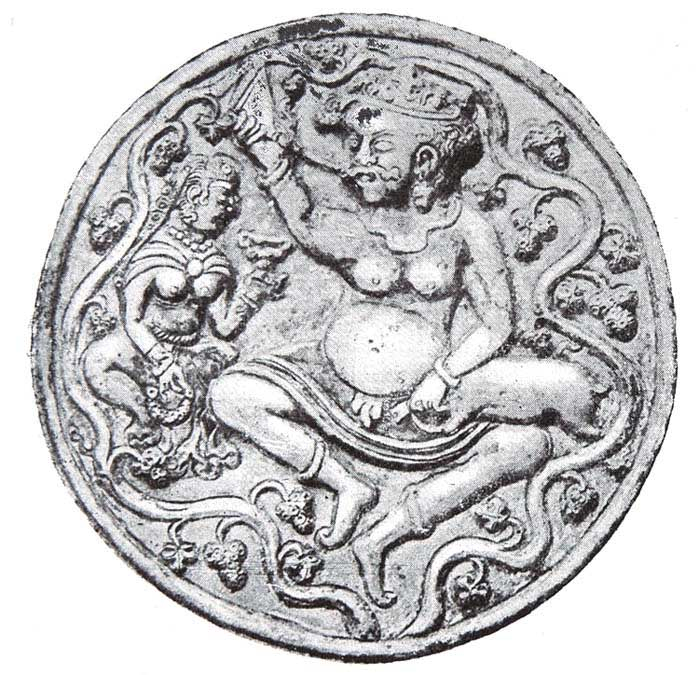
Silver gilt bowl (detail). From Buddhigharra near Tank, Dera Ismail Khan District, Northwest Frontier Province, Pakistan, ca 3rd-4th c. CE.. British Museum.

It is at 32º13' N. and 70º32' E and is to the northwest of the Indus River.

== Localities ==
The city was previously inside a fort. Here Sir Henry Durand, lieutenant-governor of the Punjab, was killed in 1870 when passing on an elephant under a gateway.
