= Charles Egerton (Indian Army officer) =

British Indian Army Field Marshal (1848–1921)

Field Marshal Sir Charles Egerton GCB DSO
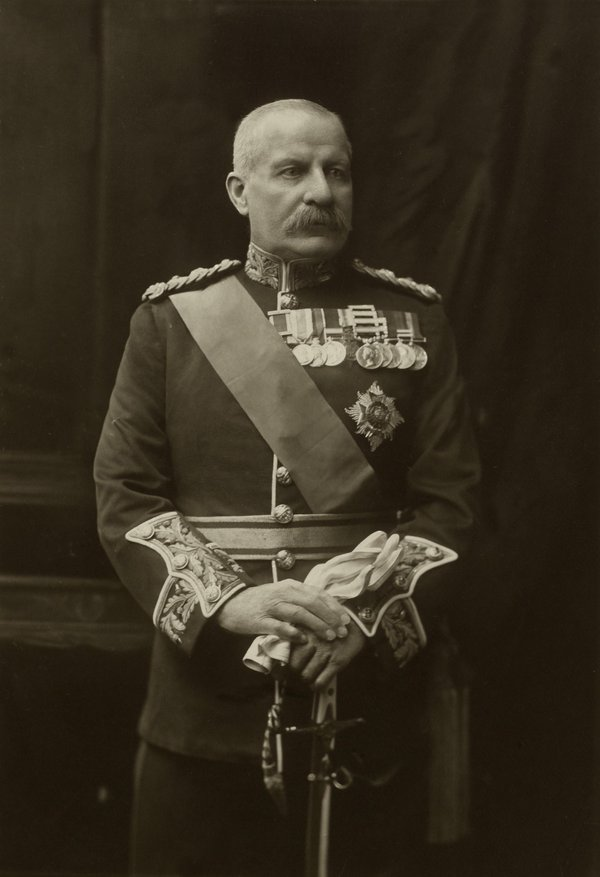
- Egerton in 1906
- Born: 10 November 1848; Parsonstown, Ireland, United Kingdom
- Died: 20 February 1921 (aged 72); Christchurch, Hampshire, United Kingdom
- Relatives: Grey Egerton Baronets; Major-General Caledon Egerton (father); Admiral Sir George Egerton (brother); Sir Brian Egerton (brother)
- Military career
- Allegiance: United Kingdom
- Branch: British Indian Army
- Service years: 1867–1907
- Rank: Field Marshal
- Commands: Madras Command (1903–07); British troops in British Somaliland (1903–04); Punjab Frontier Force (1899–03); Bannu column (1894)
- Conflicts: Second Anglo-Afghan War; Hazara Expedition; Tochi Expedition; Mahsud Waziri blockade
- Awards: Knight Grand Cross of the Order of the Bath; Distinguished Service Order; Mentioned in Despatches

Field Marshal Sir Charles Comyn Egerton (10 November 1848 – 20 February 1921) was a senior Indian Army officer from the Egerton family.

Early in his career he took part in the Second Anglo-Afghan War, the Hazara Expedition and operations in the Khyber Pass. He went on to command the Bannu column during operations in Waziristan in 1894 and to serve as senior staff officer for the Tochi Expedition in 1897. Egerton took command of the troops in British Somaliland fighting the Dervish leader Sayid Abdullah Hassan in June 1903; he had a significant success at Jidbali in January 1904 killing 1,000 of Hassan's men. His last appointment was as General Officer Commanding Secunderabad District in 1904 before retiring in 1907.

== Military career ==
Born the third son of Major-General Caledon Egerton and Margaret Egerton (née Cumming) and educated at Rossall School and the Royal Military College, Sandhurst, Egerton was commissioned into the 31st Regiment of Foot on 9 June 1867. He immediately transferred to the 76th Regiment of Foot in India. Promoted to lieutenant on 19 October 1869, he joined the Indian Staff Corps on 11 December 1872 before being promoted to captain on 8 June 1879 on appointment to a squadron in the 3rd Punjab Cavalry.

Egerton served with his regiment in the Second Anglo-Afghan War in 1879 and was mentioned in despatches. He became Assistant Adjutant-General of the Punjab Frontier Force on 30 November 1886 and, having been promoted to major on 8 June 1887, he took part in the Hazara Expedition in 1888 and in operations in the Khyber Pass in 1891 for which he was awarded the Distinguished Service Order on 30 May 1891. Promoted to lieutenant colonel on 1 September 1891, he became second-in-command of his regiment in 1892 and commanded the Bannu column during operations in Waziristan in 1894 before becoming Assistant Quartermaster-General at Bengal Command on 21 June 1895. He was appointed Companion of the Order of the Bath and then promoted to colonel on 1 September 1895.

Egerton commanded a contingent of troops sent to Suakin in 1896 to hold the town when its permanent garrison was withdrawn for service under Lord Kitchener, following which he became an aide-de-camp to the Queen on 17 November 1896. He was senior staff officer and commander of the 1st Brigade for the Tochi Expedition in 1897 before becoming Commander of the Frontier Force district with local promotion to major-general on 1 April 1899. He was promoted to the local rank of lieutenant general on 3 April 1900, as he was appointed acting commander of the Punjab Command, and reverted to his command of the Frontier Force in October 1901 when his command in Punjab ended. A promotion to the substantive rank of major-general followed on 1 April 1902 and, after leading an expedition to Waziristan later that year, he was advanced to Knight Commander of the Order of the Bath in the 1903 Durbar Honours on 1 January 1903.

Promoted to the substantive rank of lieutenant general on 28 October 1903, he became Commander-in-Chief Madras Command in 1903, serving as such until 1907. Egerton took leave from Madras post to take command of the troops in British Somaliland fighting the Dervishes led by Mohammed Abdullah Hassan on 27 June 1903. He had a significant success at Jidbali in January 1904, killing 1,000 of Hassan's men. However, in March 1904 questions were still being asked in the British Parliament as to whether Hassan (then known as the "Mad Mullah") understood that operations would only end when he was captured or killed.

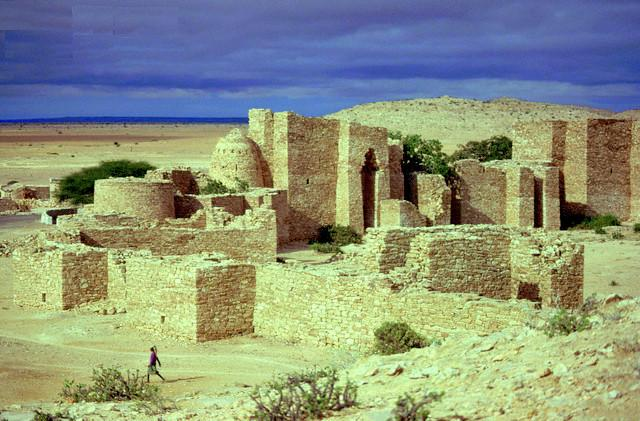
Dervish fort in Taleex.

Egerton became colonel of the 23rd Punjab Cavalry (Frontier Force) in 1904. He was advanced to Knight Grand Cross of the Order of the Bath on 24 June 1904, and promoted to full general on 28 October 1906. After retiring on 5 February 1907, he became a member of the Council of India from which post he stood down in 1917. In recognition of his long service he was promoted to field marshal on 16 March 1917.

In retirement Egerton wrote about his wartime experiences and was the author of a book entitled "Hill Warfare on the North-West Frontier of India". He died on 20 February 1921 and was buried at St Mark's Churchyard at Highcliffe in Dorset.

== Family ==
Egerton's six brothers included Admiral Sir George Egerton of the Royal Navy and Sir Brian Egerton.

In 1877 Egerton married Anna Wellwood and they went on to have three sons.

== Sources ==
- Heathcote, Tony (1999). The British Field Marshals 1736–1997. London: Pen & Sword Books Ltd. ISBN 0-85052-696-5.

Military offices
Preceded by Sir George Wolseley	C-in-C, Madras Command; 1903–1907	Post disbanded
