= Jandola =

Pakistani town

Jandola جنڈولہ جنډوله
- Town
- Location in Pakistan Jandola (Pakistan)
- Coordinates: 32°19′54″N 70°7′22″E
- Country: Pakistan
- Region: Khyber Pakhtunkhwa
- District: Tank District
- Tehsil: Jandola Tehsil
- Elevation: 2,507 ft (764 m)

Population (2017)
  - Total: 9,126
- Time zone: UTC+5 (PST)

Jandola (Pashto: جنډوله) is the main town of Jandola Tehsil in Tank District, southern Khyber Pakhtunkhwa, Pakistan. It is located at 32°20'8N 70°7'9E and lies on the boundary of South Waziristan which has made it prone to violence originating there. It has a population of 9,126 according to the 2017 Census of Pakistan. Jandola connects the city of Tank with Makeen in South Waziristan and also acts as the junction point that connects the Tank-Makeen road with Tank-Wana road. Jandola is the origin of the Bhittani tribe.
