= Tank District =

Administrative sub-division in Pakistan

Coordinates: 32.1300°N 70.2300°E

Tank District ضلع ٹانک ټانک ولسوالۍ
- District of Khyber Pakhtunkhwa
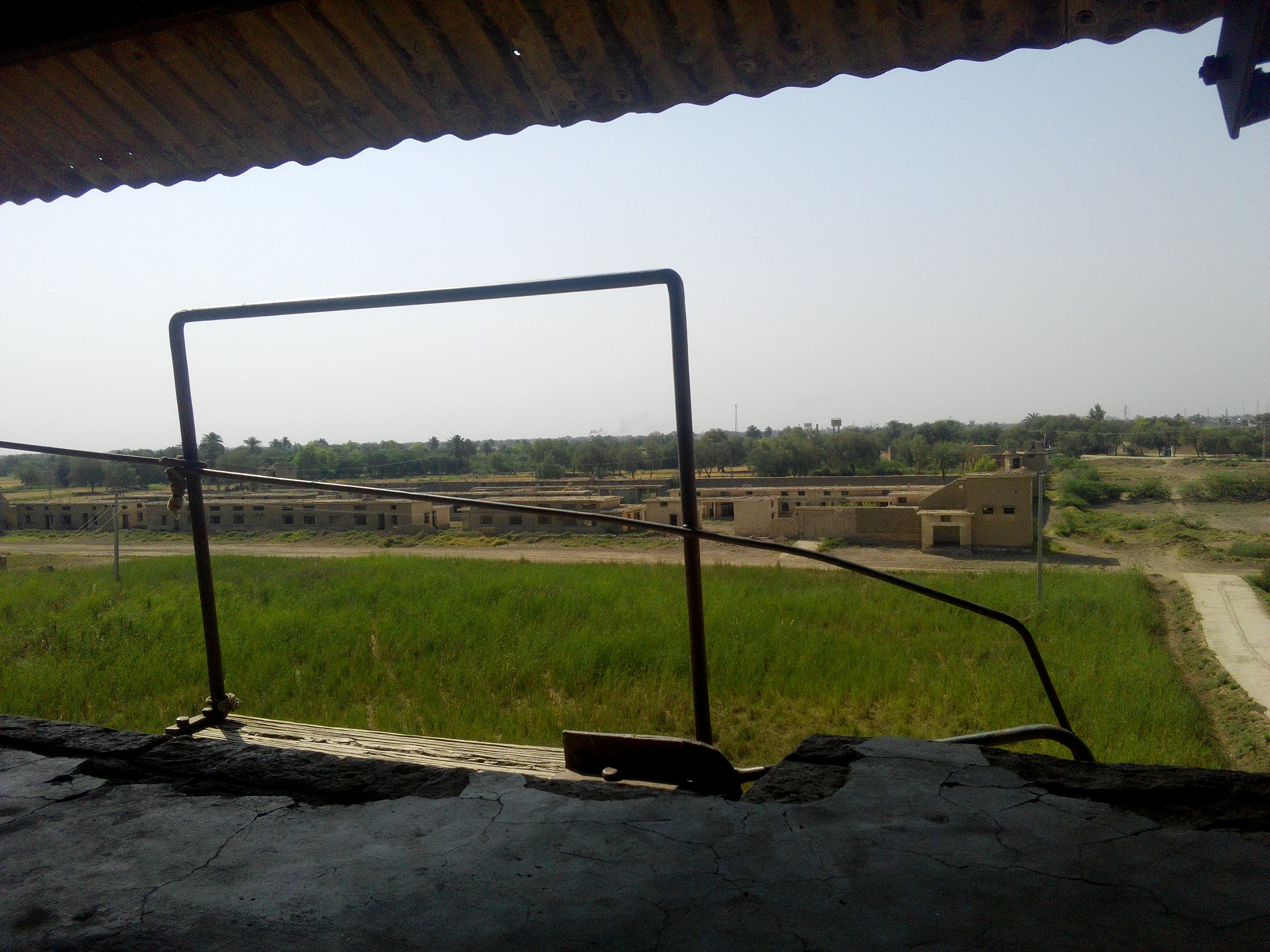
- View from Tank Railway Station

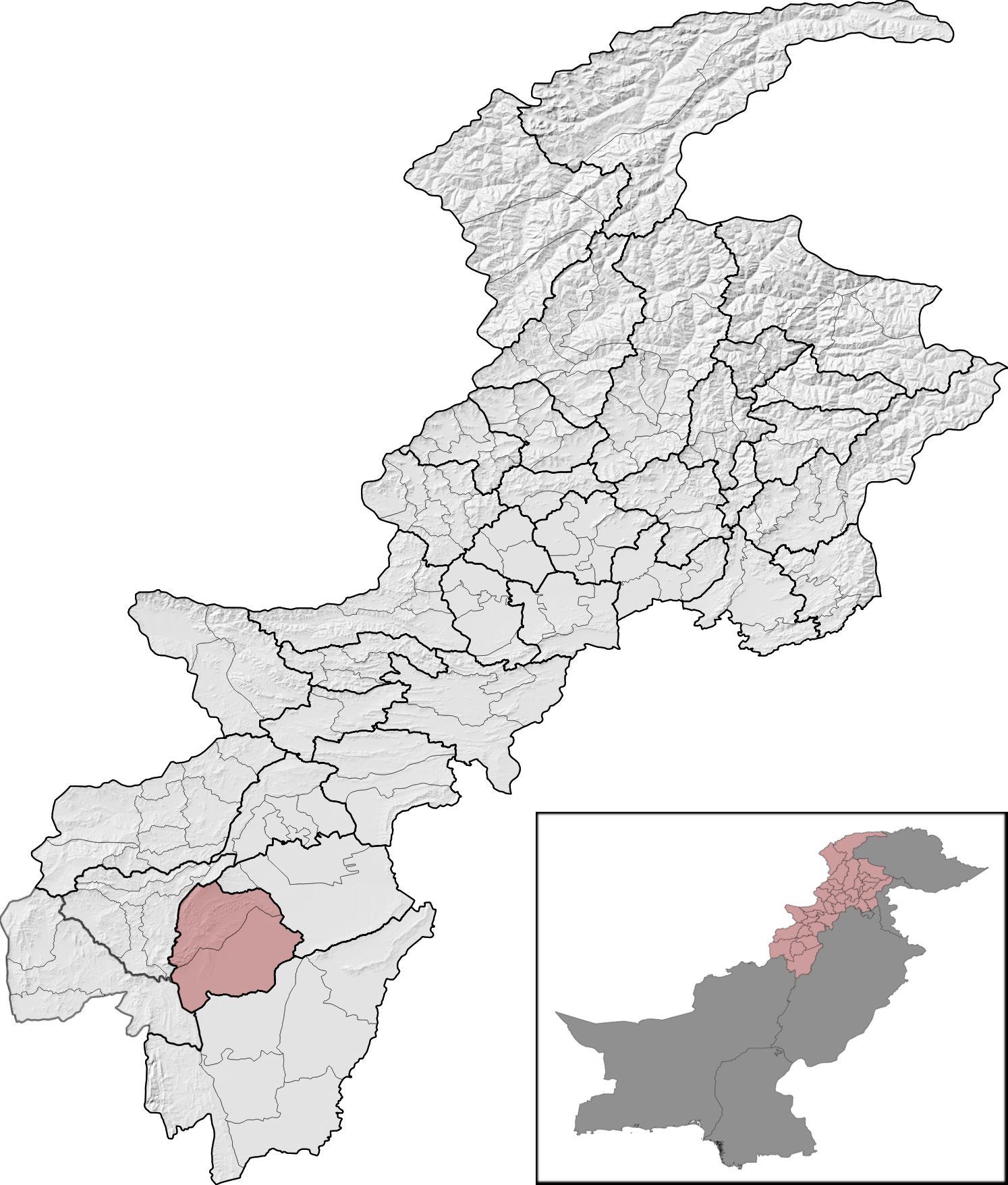
- Tak District (red) in Khyber Pakhtunkhwa
- Country: Pakistan
- Province: Khyber Pakhtunkhwa
- Division: Dera Ismail Khan
- Headquarters: Tank

Government
  - Type: District Administration
  - Deputy Commissioner: N/A
  - District Police Officer: N/A
  - District Health Officer: N/A

Area
  - District of Khyber Pakhtunkhwa: 2,900 km^{2} (1,100 sq mi)

Population (2023)
  - District of Khyber Pakhtunkhwa: 470,293
  - Density: 160/km^{2} (420/sq mi)
  - Urban: 49,172 (10.46%)
  - Rural: 421,121 (89.54%)

Literacy
  - Literacy rate: Total: 40.67%; Male: 56.89%; Female: 23.18%
- Time zone: UTC+5 (PST)
- Number of Tehsils: 1
- Number of Union councils: 16
- Website: tank.kp.gov.pk

Tank District (Pashto: ټانک ولسوالۍ, Urdu: ضلع ٹانک ṭāṅk; Saraiki: ٹاک ṭāk) is a district in the Dera Ismail Khan Division of the Khyber Pakhtunkhwa province of Pakistan.

== History ==
=== Ancient history ===
At the Battle of the Hydaspes (now the Beas River), fought between Alexander the Great's army and the Indian king Purushotthama (better known as Porus), the Macedonian army refused to go any further. It is said that the Alexander's army was at risk of being trapped, or was faced by an enemy army too big to defeat, and had to retreat southwards through the Makran desert.

Islam came in the Tank region in the eighth century A.D., when Umayyad general Muhammad Bin Qasim attacked the Multan region and the nearby areas. The tribe known as Arain in the Tank district is the generation of those Arab soldiers who came towards Multan with Muhammad Bin Qasim.

=== Modern history ===
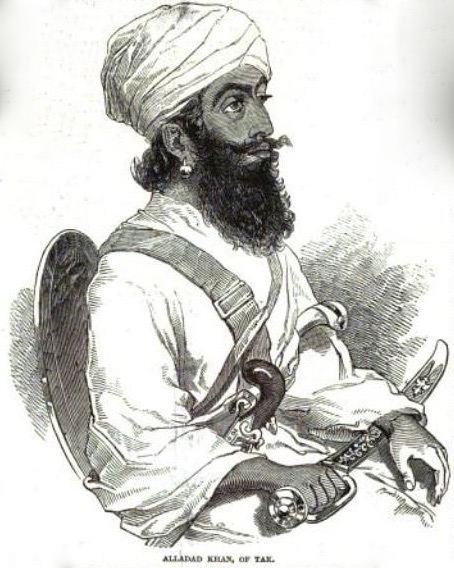
Portrait of Nawab Allahdad Khan of Tank, sketched by G. T. Vigne, published by The Illustrated London News, 25 April 1846

Finally, the Sikhs from the south overran the local tribes. They annexed the land in 1838. Somewhere in the midst of this turmoil, the British were assembling against the Pashtuns and the First British-Afghan War commenced. The British took over in 1848. The British regiments weren't able to occupy the entire territory and remained in the camps at the foothills of the mountains, while the harsh and dangerous upland terrain remained unexplored.

"...even the shadows of the hills were hazardous."

The eastern border of the Kingdom of Kabul was undefined until 1893 when the Durand Line was established. Under the same agreement, the tribes of Waziristan were clearly designated as being under the British rule.

The British negotiated with the tribes through their agents in the border towns and Tank was a centre of negotiation with the Mahsud tribe. For the Britishers, the Mahsud tribe was the most difficult to control. In 1860, when the Mullah Shaleem Kaka Machi Khel Mahsud's army attacked the British with a 3000 strong armed-men, the British were forced to penetrate into the territory of Tank to control them.

In January 1899, Lord Curzon was appointed as the Viceroy of India. Reaching India shortly after the suppression of the frontier risings of 1897–98, he paid special attention to the independent tribes of the north-west frontier and inaugurated a new province called the North-West Frontier Province (now Khyber Pakhtunkhwa), and pursued a policy of forceful control mingled with conciliation. The only major armed outbreak on this frontier during the period of his administration was the Mahsud Waziri campaign of 1901.

=== Post-independence ===
After the partition of the subcontinent, the Tank district became a part of Pakistan. In 2018, the Frontier Region Tank was formally merged with Tank district.

== Geography ==
The city of Tank is the headquarter of the district, which consists of Union Council City I and Union Council City II. There are sixteen Union councils in the district Tank. Until 1992, Tank was a tehsil within Dera Ismail Khan district. Tank is bordered with the district of Lakki Marwat in the northeast, Dera Ismail Khan in the east, FR Tank in the north and the South Waziristan district in the west. The temperature of Tank reaches 110–120 °F in summer. However, in the winter, it is normal. People of the mountainous regions of the west usually come to Tank to avoid cold weather and then return during the summer.

== Administration ==
The district contains two Tehsils - Tank and Jandola. And is represented in the Provincial Assembly by one elected MPA, who represents the PK-108 (Tank) constituency.

Member of Provincial Assembly	Party affiliation	Constituency	Year
Muhammad Usman	[PTI]	Tank	2024

=== Tehsils ===
Tehsil	Name (Urdu)	Name (Pashto)	Area (km²)	Pop. (2023)	Density (ppl/km²) (2023)	Literacy rate (2023)	Union Councils
Jandola Tehsil	تحصیل جنڈولہ	(Pashto: جنډوله تحصیل)	1,221	44,794	36.69	33.63%	
Tank Tehsil	تحصیل ٹانک	(Pashto: ټانک تحصیل)	1,679	425,499	253.42	41.43%	

== Demographics ==
=== Population ===
Historical population
Year	Pop.	±% p.a.
1951	...	—
1961	...	—
1972	120,005	—
1981	171,245	+4.03%
1998	265,432	+2.61%
2017	427,044	+2.53%
2023	470,293	+1.62%

As of the 2023 census, Tank district has 70,563 households and a population of 470,293. The district has a sex ratio of 105.63 males to 100 females and a literacy rate of 40.67%: 56.89% for males and 23.18% for females. 162,761 (34.61% of the surveyed population) are under 10 years of age. 49,172 (10.46%) live in urban areas.

=== Religion ===
Religion in contemporary Tank District
Religious group	1941		2017		2023	
Religious group	Pop.	%	Pop.	%	Pop.	%
Islam	49,847	89.55%	426,541	99.89%	469,033	99.73%
Hinduism	5,279	9.48%	5	~0%	2	~0%
Sikhism	390	0.70%	—N/a	—N/a	6	~0%
Christianity	81	0.15%	267	0.06%	1,164	0.25%
Others	67	0.12%	231	0.05%	88	0.02%
Total Population	55,664	100%	427,044	100%	470,293 (Note: Different from official population figure since it excludes sensitive areas where religion was not asked)	100%
Note: 1941 census data is for Tank tehsil of erstwhile Dera Ismail Khan district, which roughly corresponds to contemporary Tank district, excluding the former Frontier Region Tank. District and tehsil borders have changed since 1941.

=== Languages ===
Languages of Tank district (2023)
1. Pashto (83.3%)
2. Saraiki (16.3%)
3. Others (0.38%)

At the time of the 2023 census, 83.32% of the population spoke Pashto and 16.30% Saraiki as their first language.

People make their livelihood by farming, falcon catching, migration for employment to the Persian Gulf, or through businesses in Tank.

"Jirga" means council. These are the religious circles and a group of people that decide the fate of the dwellers and rule the people by their sets of laws and principles.

== Tourism ==
=== Shrines ===
The Shrine of Pir Sabir Shah Baba is one of the most visited places in the city. A number of devotees from the city and adjacent districts including Bannu, Lakki and Dera Ismail Khan visit this shrine. The three-day Urs of Pir Sabir Shah Baba is annually organized from June 2 to June 5. Earlier, the Urs was considered to be one of the big festivals of the city and a large number of people attended the Urs. The Shrine Custodian still distribute foods among people visiting the shrine and Halwa (a traditional sweet) is usually given on every Wednesday. Second popular shrine in the Tank region is the Mama Pir Ziarat which is located near Umar Adda and a number of devotees visit the shrine of Mama Pir. The Urs of Mama Pir is also organized annually.

=== Nawab Qilla ===
Nawab Qilla is a mud fort built most probably by Nawab Katal Khan with views over an area of more than two hundred Kanals of land. The Qilla is situated at one corner of the Tank city and that is the imaginary line-dividing Tank into upper and lower part. The mud walls are several feet high approximately equal to a modern-day three-story building. Huge trunks of trees can be seen poking out from the walls of Qilla. These were used to give strength and stability to the mud walls. There were four huge burgs at each corner of the Qilla with several intervening pickets at regular distance all around. The four main burgs were used as an entrance for armed men who could move around and reach guard posts from within the Qilla without being seen from outside. The Qilla had three gigantic gates. The diameter or thickness of the wall from the top was initially equal to so that a Tanga (Horse Cart) could easily move over it. The residence of the Nawab Sahib was in the center of Qilla.

=== Nawab of Tank Garden ===
The Nawab Bagh was situated at the back of Nawab Qilla, spread over an area of more than five hundred Kanals of land. This bagh was well looked after before, during Nawab Qasim Khan time and perhaps in the early days of Qutbuddin Khan. Nawab Qutbuddin Khan had kept large herd of buffalos, cows and it was not unusual to see a herd of two hundred or more buffalos, cows moving toward Nawab Qilla every day. Nawab Bagh as said before even in the sixties was deserted, has now completely disappeared as the land was sold by Qutbuddin s’ sons and a housing colony named Qutub colony has been constructed over its place right up to city police station and Pir Sabir Shah mausoleum.

== See also ==
- Federally Administered Tribal Areas
- Kakka Khel
- Khwajikhel
- Kot Allah Dad
- Districts of Pakistan
  - Districts of Khyber Pakhtunkhwa
  - Districts of Punjab, Pakistan
  - Districts of Balochistan, Pakistan
  - Districts of Sindh, Pakistan
  - Districts of Azad Kashmir
  - Districts of Gilgit-Baltistan
- Divisions of Pakistan
  - Divisions of Balochistan
  - Divisions of Khyber Pakhtunkhwa
  - Divisions of Punjab, Pakistan
  - Divisions of Sindh
  - Divisions of Azad Kashmir
  - Divisions of Gilgit-Baltistan
